= Leightoniella =

Scientific classification
- Kingdom: Fungi
- Division: Ascomycota
- Class: Lecanoromycetes
- Order: Peltigerales
- Family: Pannariaceae
- Genus: Leightoniella; Henssen (1965)
- Species: L. zeylanensis

Binomial name
- Leightoniella zeylanensis (Leight.) Henssen (1965)

Synonyms
- Pterygium zeylanense Leight. (1870)

Single-species lichen genus

Leightoniella is a fungal genus in the family Pannariaceae. This is a monotypic genus, containing the single species Leightoniella zeylanensis, a cyanolichen known to occur only in Sri Lanka. This lichen forms thin, leaf-like sheets that are brown-violet when dry and become jelly-soft when wet, with the thallus divided into many slender lobes. It was originally classified in a different lichen family (the Collemataceae) but molecular studies have since shown it belongs in the Pannariaceae.

== Taxonomy ==
The genus was circumscribed in 1965 by the Norwegian lichenologist Aino Henssen. The generic name honours the English clergyman and botanist William Allport Leighton, who originally described the type species in 1870 as Pterygium zeylanense. When she erected the genus, Henssen transferred Pterygium zeylanense to Leightoniella zeylanensis and fixed the name by designating the 1868 Thwaites collection in Kew (K) as lectotype, a step she published together with the new combination. She further stressed that Leightoniella is monotypic and distinguished it from every other simple-spored member of the then Collemataceae by the periclinal (parallel) arrangement of hyphae in the proper exciple, rather than the usual anticlinal architecture. In both her natural and artificial keys to the family, the genus keys out in the couplet defined by a well-developed thalline margin combined with that periclinal exciple structure, thereby separating it from Physma, Ramalodium and related genera.

Subsequent molecular phylogenetics studies have shown that Leightoniella is not part of the Collemataceae (where it was previously classified) but nests securely within the Pannariaceae, forming a strongly supported clade with Physma, Lepidocollema and Gibbosporina; recent classifications therefore place the genus in the Pannariaceae while retaining its monotypic status.

== Description ==
The lichen body (thallus) forms a thin, leaf-like sheet that is brown-violet when dry and turns jelly-soft after rain. It spreads to about 3 cm across and is divided into many slender, slightly raised lobes only 1–2 mm wide and up to 1–2 cm long. These lobes often sprout even smaller side lobes, giving the surface a finely tufted or overlapping look; underneath they are paler and show shallow grooves. A delicate one- to three-cell-thick cortex (a skin of tightly joined fungal cells whose walls become slightly gummy) overlies a looser network of colourless fungal threads (hyphae). Between the hyphae run chains of the cyanobacterium Nostoc, whose violet-tinged cells (about 3–7 μm in diameter) supply the fungus with fixed nitrogen and help the whole thallus swell when wet.

Reproductive structures appear as small, stalked discs (apothecia) up to 2 mm wide. Each disc has a wrinkled rim made from the lichen's own tissue (thalline margin) and a flat, red-brown spore surface. Beneath the surface lies a spore-producing layer (hymenium) about 85–110 μm tall. The protective rim immediately below the hymenium (excipulum) is built from hyphae aligned parallel to the surface (periclinal), a feature unique in this family; additional supportive tissue strengthens both the margin and the stalk. Inside the hymenium, cylindrical asci each contain eight thick-walled, colourless, single-celled ascospores measuring roughly 12–15 × 5.5–7.5 μm. Tiny flask-like pycnidia, embedded in the thallus near the apothecia, produce minute asexual conidia.

== Habitat and distribution ==
Leightoniella zeylanensis is known from a single region. The type collection, taken by G. H. K. Thwaites in 1868 near Ambagamuwa, Sri Lanka, grew on constantly wet stones beside a river, showing a preference for humid riparian rock substrates.

For more than a century no further material was reported, and the species was considered extremely rare. Its continued survival was confirmed only when fresh specimens collected in the 2010s allowed molecular sequencing; these finds underpinned a study that transferred the genus to the Pannariaceae.
