= Lepidocollema wainioi =

Scientific classification
- Kingdom: Fungi
- Division: Ascomycota
- Class: Lecanoromycetes
- Order: Peltigerales
- Family: Pannariaceae
- Genus: Lepidocollema
- Species: L. wainioi

Binomial name
- Lepidocollema wainioi (Zahlbr.) P.M.Jørg. (2014)

Synonyms
- Pannaria sorediata Vain. (1921); Pannaria wainioi Zahlbr. (1925); Parmeliella wainioi (Zahlbr.) P.M.Jørg. [as 'vainioi'] (2003)

Species of lichen

Lepidocollema wainioi is a species of lichen in the family Pannariaceae. It is known from southeast Asia.

== Taxonomy ==
This lichen was originally formally described by Finnish lichenologist Edvard August Wainio as Pannaria sorediata, based on material collected from the Philippines. However, Wainio was unaware that this name had already been used for another taxon by Charles Knight in 1882, and so the name Pannaria sorediata Vain. was an illegitimate homonym, and therefore, not validly published. Austrian botanist Alexander Zahlbruckner, in his 1925 work Catalogus Lichenum Universalis, renamed the lichen in honour of Wainio, and it then became known as Pannaria wainioi Zahlbr..

Per Magnus Jørgensen transferred the species to the genus Parmeliella in 2003. In 2014, the family Pannariaceae was revised with the aid of modern molecular phylogenetics, and Parmeliella wainioi (Zahlbr.) P.M.Jørg. was one of 23 tropical species transferred into the formerly monotypic genus Lepidocollema.

== Description ==
The lichen has a thallus that ranges from squamulose (covered with minute scales) to foliose (leafy) with lobes that are somewhat linear to linear at the margin. Farinose (mealy) soredia are present at the lobes along the margin. The lower surface of the thallus has brown to black rhizines.

== Habitat and distribution ==
Lepidocollema wainioi was originally described from collections made in the Philippines. It was also reported from Koh Kut Island (Thailand) in 2016, where it was found growing in an Avicennia-Sonneratia mangrove zone.
