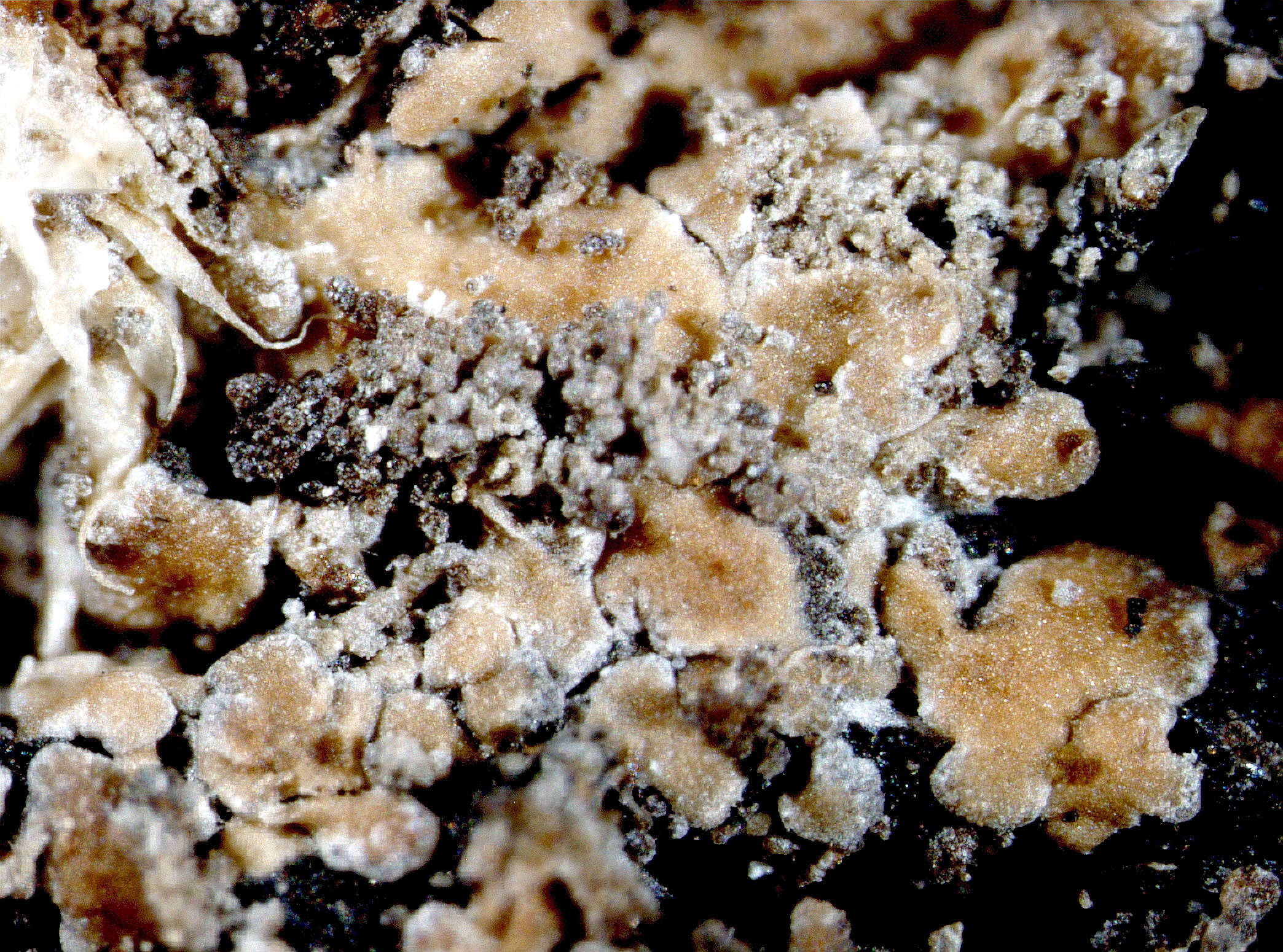

Scientific classification
- Kingdom: Fungi
- Division: Ascomycota
- Class: Lecanoromycetes
- Order: Peltigerales
- Family: Pannariaceae
- Genus: Nevesia; P.M.Jørg., L.Lindblom, Wedin & S.Ekman (2014)
- Species: N. sampaiana

Binomial name
- Nevesia sampaiana (Tav.) P.M.Jørg., L.Lindblom, Wedin & S.Ekman (2014)

= Nevesia =

Single-species fungal genus

Nevesia is a single-species fungal genus in the family Pannariaceae. It contains the species Nevesia sampaiana, a lichen. The lichen forms small, chestnut-brown scales over a conspicuous blue-black base, and reproduces mainly by powdery vegetative propagules (soredia) rather than spores. It is found in western Europe, where it grows on the bark of mature trees in humid woodlands.

== Taxonomy ==
Nevesia was circumscribed in 2014 by Per M. Jørgensen, Louise Lindblom, Mats Wedin, and Stefan Ekman to accommodate its sole species, N. sampaiana, which had previously been treated as Pannaria sampaiana and later as Fuscopannaria sampaiana. The authors concluded from their revised phylogeny of the Pannariaceae that this lichen represented a distinct lineage rather than a member of Fuscopannaria.

The generic name honours the Portuguese lichenologist Carlos das Neves Tavares, who had first recognized the species at species rank in 1950 as Pannaria sampaiana. Within the family, Nevesia was recovered in clade 2a and placed as sister to a larger group containing mainly Leciophysma, Protopannaria, and Fuscopannaria.

== Description ==
Nevesia is a crustose to squamulose lichen forming closely appressed, chestnut-brown squamules about 2–3 mm wide and up to 200 μm thick over a conspicuous blue-black hypothallus. The squamules are usually rounded, but rarely develop distinct elongate blunt marginal lobes up to 3–4 mm long. The soralia are cream-coloured and coarsely granular, occurring both along the margins and on the upper surface of the thallus. In specimens that are densely sorediate, the soredia may spread to form an nearly continuous cream-coloured crust. Its upper cortex is cellular, while the photobiont layer contains clustered cells of Nostoc. Beneath this lies a medulla of loosely interwoven hyphae that merges gradually into the hypothallus. The thallus also develops cream-coloured, granular soralia.

Fruiting bodies (apothecia) are extremely rare and are known only in an immature state, so mature asci have not been observed. When present, the apothecia have a thalline margin, and the hymenium is hemiamyloid, showing only a partial iodine reaction. Pycnidia are unknown, and no lichen products have been detected using thin-layer chromatography.

== Habitat and distribution ==
Ekman and colleagues treated Nevesia as an Atlantic-Mediterranean European genus and one of the few genera in the Pannariaceae confined to the Northern Hemisphere. In the same work, N. sampaiana was characterized as a nearly always sterile species. The type material was collected in the Serra do Gerês of northern Portugal, where Carlos das Neves Tavares first recognized it as distinct at species rank. In the British Isles, N. sampaiana grows on smooth or mossy bark of mature trees, especially beech, elm, and ash, more rarely on mossy rock in humid relict woodlands, and occasionally on wayside trees. It is locally frequent in the Scottish Highlands, but scarce and decreasing in Wales and south-west England; it is also recorded from south-west Ireland.

Nevesia sampaiana is the only known host of the lichenicolous (lichen-dwelling) fungus species Arthonia sampaianae.
