= Santessoniella pulchella =

Scientific classification
- Kingdom: Fungi
- Division: Ascomycota
- Class: Lecanoromycetes
- Order: Peltigerales
- Family: Pannariaceae
- Genus: Santessoniella
- Species: S. pulchella

Binomial name
- Santessoniella pulchella P.M.Jørg. (1998)

Species of lichen-forming fungus

Santessoniella pulchella is a species of lichen in the family Pannariaceae. It is a bright bluish, gelatinous, crust-forming lichen with distinctive pinkish fruiting bodies, found on bark and moss in moist, warm-temperate rainforest. The species was described in 1998 and is known from eastern New South Wales in Australia and from the northern North Island of New Zealand.

== Taxonomy ==
Santessoniella pulchella was described as a new species by Per Magnus Jørgensen in 1998 from material collected on Clyde Mountain in New South Wales by J. A. Elix in 1976. Jørgensen placed the species in Santessoniella because it has an almost uniform, gelatinous thallus with only a thin outer cortex, together with a hymenial iodine reaction that turns reddish-brown, characters that distinguish the genus from Parmeliella in the strict sense. He also noted that it differs from the type species, S. polychidiodes, in having a nearly crustose rather than somewhat fruticose thallus and flattened, immersed apothecia that may develop a secondary thalline margin. The specific epithet refers to the attractive colour contrast between the bluish thallus and the pinkish apothecia.

A later study by Aino Henssen emended the description of Santessoniella pulchella on the basis of the isotype and additional Australian material. Henssen wrote that Jørgensen had failed to recognize a lower cortex in the species, and accepted S. pulchella in Santessoniella because its thallus anatomy agrees with other members of the genus that have warty ascospores. She regarded thallus structure as more important for generic delimitation than variation in the iodine reaction of the hymenium.

== Description ==
The thallus forms a bright bluish, gelatinous crust up to 5 cm across that swells when wet and dries into cracked areolae up to 3 mm wide. It consists of small rosettes of flattened, star-like, narrow lobes (squamules up to 0.8 mm in diameter) pressed closely against the substrate, with a thin cortical layer enclosing curled chains of the cyanobacterium Nostoc. In cross-section, the thallus is 45–85 μm thick, with an upper cortex 6–10.5 μm thick and a lower cortex 2.5–8.5 μm thick.

The apothecia are abundant, pinkish, sessile to immersed, and up to 2 mm in diameter. They are usually flat at first but may become convex with age, and sometimes develop a secondary thalline margin. The hymenium is 70–120 μm tall and gives a hemiamyloid iodine reaction that finally becomes reddish-brown. The asci are narrowly elongate, and the ascospores are colourless, simple, ellipsoid, warty, and measure 12–18 × 6–8.5 μm, containing several unequal oil droplets. No lichen products were detected by thin-layer chromatography.

== Habitat and distribution ==
Santessoniella pulchella is a corticolous to muscicolous species of moist, warm-temperate rainforest. At the time of its description it was known from eastern New South Wales in Australia and from northern New Zealand, including the Three Kings Islands, the North Auckland area, and the Waikato district. Recorded substrates include the bark of a forest vine, the base of a rainforest tree, the trunk of Eucryphia, and Leptospermum. Jørgensen suggested that the species may eventually prove to be more widespread, but considered it likely to be endemic to the Tasman Sea region.

In addition to the type material from Clyde Mountain, Henssen reported the species from Monga State Forest along the Mongarlowe River in New South Wales, where it was collected in forest dominated by Acacia and Eucryphia moorei at 660 m on the trunk of a young eucalypt. Henssen also described S. pulchella as the only species of Santessoniella known from Australasia.
