= Parmeliella triptophylloides =

Scientific classification
- Domain: Eukaryota
- Kingdom: Fungi
- Division: Ascomycota
- Class: Lecanoromycetes
- Order: Peltigerales
- Family: Pannariaceae
- Genus: Parmeliella
- Species: P. triptophylloides

Binomial name
- Parmeliella triptophylloides P.M.Jørg. (2003)

Species of lichen

Parmeliella triptophylloides is a species of corticolous (bark-dwelling) lichen in the family Pannariaceae. Found in east Africa, it was formally described as a new species in 2003 by Norwegian lichenologist Per Magnus Jørgensen. The type specimen was collected by Dutch mycologist Rudolf Arnold Maas Geesteranus in 1949, from the Cherang'any Hills (Trans-Nzoia County, Kenya) at an elevation of 900 m (3,000 ft). In addition to the type locality, it has also been recorded from the Luhangalo Plateau in Tanzania.

Parmeliella triptophylloides has a thallus that is both crustose (crusty) and squamulose (scaley), and in maturity breaks into areoles. The thallus rests upon a blackish, crust-like prothallus. The squamules are rounded to elongated, smooth and greyish-brown, measuring up to 1.5 mm (0.06 in) wide. Greyish-blue isidia covers the squamules and obscure the thallus. The lichen is somewhat similar in morphology to Parmeliella triptophylla; the specific epithet triptophylloides refers to this resemblance.
