= Parmeliella dactylifera =

Scientific classification
- Kingdom: Fungi
- Division: Ascomycota
- Class: Lecanoromycetes
- Order: Peltigerales
- Family: Pannariaceae
- Genus: Parmeliella
- Species: P. dactylifera

Binomial name
- Parmeliella dactylifera P.M.Jørg. (2003)

Species of lichen

Parmeliella dactylifera is a species of squamulose lichen in the family Pannariaceae. It is a small, squamulose lichen characterised by distinctive finger-like isidia, native to South Africa.

== Taxonomy ==
Parmeliella dactylifera was formally described in 2003 by the Norwegian lichenologist Per Magnus Jørgensen. The species epithet dactylifera refers to the distinctive finger-like (digitate) isidia that are characteristic of this species. The holotype specimen was collected 25 km east of Lydenburg at Long Tom Pass near Whisky Spruit in the Transvaal region of South Africa, where it was found growing in a small grove of planted Eucalyptus trees.

The species shares some similarities with Parmeliella stylophora, but is readily distinguished by its small squamulose thallus and distinctive digitate isidia. It may represent the isidiate counterpart of Parmeliella imbricatula, a species otherwise known from South America that was also discovered in South Africa around the same time.

== Description ==
Parmeliella dactylifera forms a small-squamulose, grey-brown thallus that is often variegated (showing patches of different colours). It grows in colonies up to 5 cm in diameter, resting on a thin blackish prothallus (the initial growth of the lichen). Individual squamules (scale-like structures) reach up to 3 mm in diameter.

The most distinctive feature of this species is the presence of mainly marginal, digitate (finger-like) isidia (vegetative reproductive structures) that can grow up to 1.5 mm long. These isidia have enlarged tips that often turn blackish, creating a distinctive appearance. The thallus is relatively thick (200–250 μm) with a distinct paraplectenchymatous cortex (a tissue composed of cells arranged in a jigsaw puzzle-like pattern) that is 25–30 μm thick.

Fully mature apothecia (fruiting bodies) have not been observed, though immature ones show an indistinct thalline margin and brown disc. The hymenium (fertile tissue layer) stains persistently blue when exposed to iodine, and the asci (spore-producing cells) contain amyloid apical structures. Ascospores were observed only in an immature state but appear to be simple and colourless.

All chemical spot tests (PD, K, C) are negative, and no secondary metabolites (lichen substances) were detected by thin-layer chromatography.

== Habitat and distribution ==
Parmeliella dactylifera is a corticolous species, meaning it grows on tree bark. As of its description in 2003, it was known only from two localities in South Africa: the type locality near Lydenburg in the Transvaal region, and Table Mountain in the Cape Province. It was included in the 2016 supplement to the lichen checklist of South Africa.

In its type locality, a particularly humid ('oceanic') habitat, it occurs alongside several other widespread members of the family Pannariaceae, including Pannaria conoplea, P. rubiginosa, and P. tavaresii. This association suggests that it prefers moist, humid conditions typical of these Pannariaceae-rich communities.
