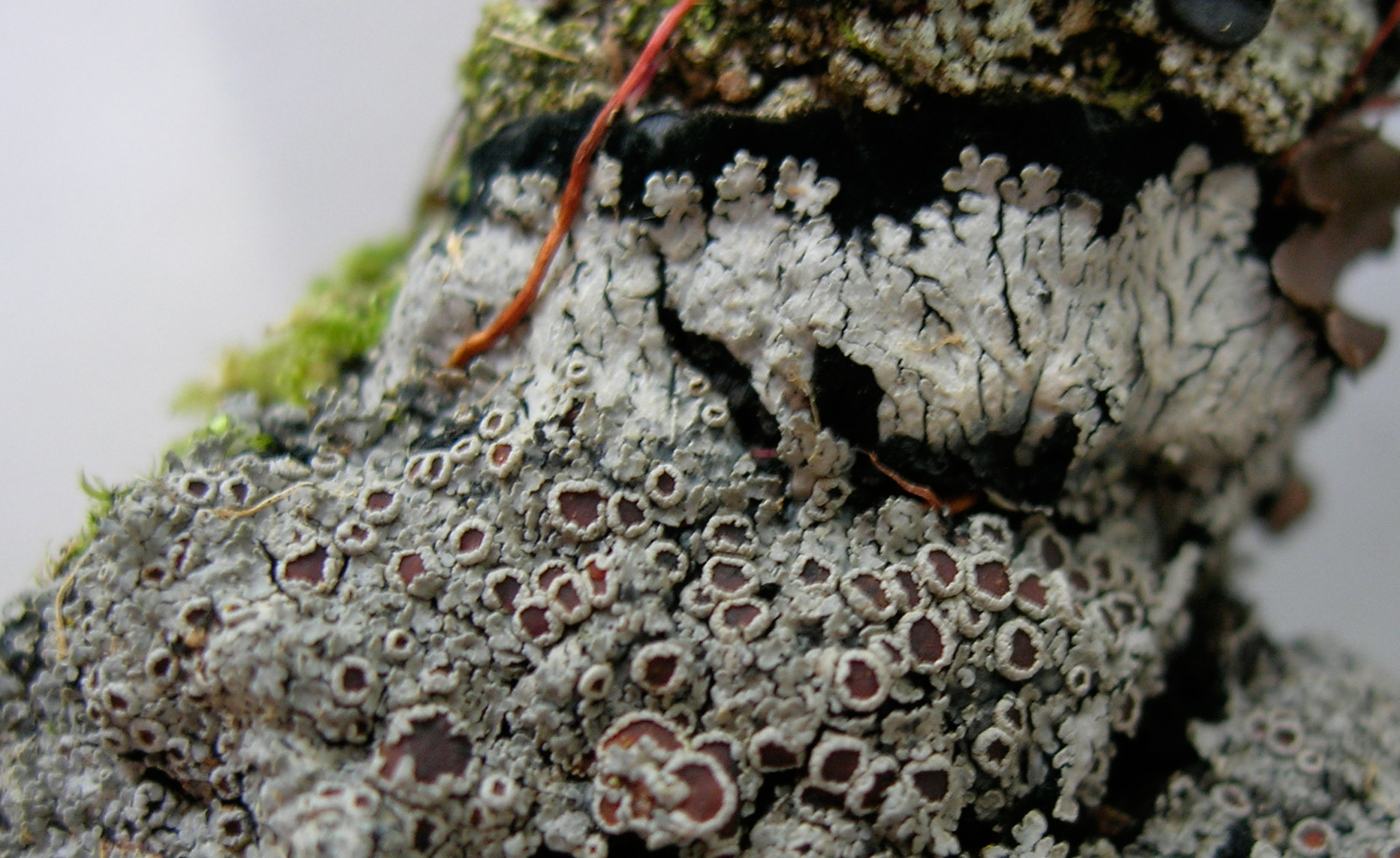
- Lepidocollema marianum in Keaau, Hawaii Island

Scientific classification
- Domain: Eukaryota
- Kingdom: Fungi
- Division: Ascomycota
- Class: Lecanoromycetes
- Order: Peltigerales
- Family: Pannariaceae
- Genus: Lepidocollema; Vain. (1890)

Type species
- Lepidocollema carassense Vain. (1890)

= Lepidocollema =

Genus of lichens

Lepidocollema is a genus of lichens in the family Pannariaceae. It was circumscribed in 1890 to contain a single Brazilian species that has not been collected since. In 2016, the entire family was revised and updated, resulting in the expansion of Lepidocollema to 24 tropical species.

== Taxonomy ==
Lepidocollema was originally circumscribed in 1890 by Finnish lichenologist Edvard August Vainio with only the type species, L. carassense. This lichen is a gelatinous Parmeliella-like species that has a photobiont from the genus Nostoc. It has only been collected once from Brazil. The family Pannariaceae was revised in 2014 with the help of molecular phylogenetics. As a result, the genus was accepted and 23 tropical species were transferred into it, mostly from the genus Parmeliella. Phylogenetically, Lepidocollema is sister to Physma.

== Description ==
Lepidocollema is characterised by the formation of large, flat rosettes on a thick layer of rhizohyphae, the presence of a cellular thalline cortex, apothecia with a thalline margin, asci with a wide apical ring-structure, and thin-walled ascospores. Other than the type species, the thallus is heteromerous in all Lepidocollema species. This refers to a tissue arrangement whereby the mycobiont (hyphae) and photobionts (algal cells) are arranged in distinct layers.

== Species ==
- Lepidocollema adpressum (P.M.Jørg.) P.M.Jørg. (2014)
- Lepidocollema allochroum (Makhija & Adaw.) P.M.Jørg. (2014)
- Lepidocollema borbonicum (P.M.Jørg. & Schumm) P.M.Jørg. (2014)
- Lepidocollema brisbanense (C.Knight) P.M.Jørg. (2014)
- Lepidocollema carassense Vain. (1890)
- Lepidocollema cineratum (Zahlbr.) P.M.Jørg. (2014)
- Lepidocollema endoluteum (P.M.Jørg.) P.M.Jørg. (2014)
- Lepidocollema endomiltum (Vain.) P.M.Jørg. (2014)
- Lepidocollema exornatum (Zahlbr.) P.M.Jørg. (2014)
- Lepidocollema fuscatum (P.M.Jørg.) P.M.Jørg. (2014)
- Lepidocollema granuliferum (P.M.Jørg.) P.M.Jørg. (2014)
- Lepidocollema imbricatulum (Müll.Arg.) P.M.Jørg. (2014)
- Lepidocollema leiostroma (Nyl.) P.M.Jørg. (2014)
- Lepidocollema macrosporum (Makhija & Adaw.) P.M.Jørg. (2014)
- Lepidocollema marianum (Fr.) P.M.Jørg. (2014)
- Lepidocollema montanum (P.M.Jørg. & Sipman) P.M.Jørg. (2014)
- Lepidocollema nitidum (P.M.Jørg. & Sipman) P.M.Jørg. (2014)
- Lepidocollema pannarioides (P.M.Jørg. & Sipman) P.M.Jørg. (2014)
- Lepidocollema papillatum (P.M.Jørg.) P.M.Jørg. (2014)
- Lepidocollema polyphyllinum (P.M.Jørg.) P.M.Jørg. (2014)
- Lepidocollema stylophorum (Vain.) P.M. Jørg. (2014)
- Lepidocollema wainioi (Zahlbr.) P.M.Jørg. (2014)
- Lepidocollema zeylanicum (P.M.Jørg.) P.M.Jørg. (2014)
