= Siphulastrum =

Scientific classification
- Domain: Eukaryota
- Kingdom: Fungi
- Division: Ascomycota
- Class: Lecanoromycetes
- Order: Peltigerales
- Family: Pannariaceae
- Genus: Siphulastrum; Müll.Arg. (1889)

Type species
- Siphulastrum triste Müll.Arg. (1889)

Species
- S. cladinoides S. granulatum S. mamillatum S. triste S. usneoides

Genus of lichens

Siphulastrum is a genus of lichen-forming fungi in the family Pannariaceae. It has five species. The genus was circumscribed by Johannes Müller Argoviensis in 1889, with S. triste assigned as the type species.

== Description ==
The genus Siphulastrum comprises lichens that have a small, leaf-like (foliose) to scale-like (squamulose) thallus, which can be either smooth or covered with tiny bumps and warty projections. In some species, these features are so densely packed that they form tufted mats. The upper surface of the thallus varies in colour from yellowish-brown to grey-brown or even blackened and is often covered with fine, hair-like structures. The underside lacks a protective layer (ecorticate) and is pale brown, attaching to the substrate through root-like structures called rhizohyphae, which can be white to blue-black in colour. The lichen has a cyanobacterial photobiont (a photosynthetic partner), specifically from the genus Scytonema, with cells arranged in chains.

Siphulastrum produces its reproductive structures in the form of apothecia, which are cup-shaped and lack a rim made from the thallus (biatorine). The disc of the apothecia is initially red-brown but soon turns black. The outer layer of the apothecia (proper exciple) is thin and persists as the lichen matures. It starts pale red-brown but eventually becomes the same colour as the disc, made up of radiating, tightly packed fungal filaments. The layer beneath the apothecia (hypothecium) ranges from pale to deep yellow-brown and intensifies in colour when treated with potassium hydroxide solution (K).

The hymenium, the spore-producing layer, is partially amyloid, meaning it reacts with iodine, turning red (I+) and blue (KI+). This layer is mostly colourless (hyaline) but is covered by a greyish upper layer (epithecium). The filaments within the hymenium (paraphyses) are simple and relatively thick, measuring 3–4 μm in width, with slightly enlarged and often pigmented tips.

The asci, which are the cells that produce spores, are club-shaped and contain eight spores. They have a unique Siphulastrum-type structure, with a thin outer wall that turns intensely blue when treated with iodine (KI+), and a well-developed inner part (tholus) that lacks internal structures. The spores are simple, colourless (hyaline), and ellipsoid, typically with a roughened outer layer about 1 μm thick.

The chemical composition of Siphulastrum includes argopsin, a secondary metabolite (lichen product) found in some lichens.

While Siphulastrum is similar to some other taxa in the Pannariaceae, such as some Pannaria species, Fuscopannaria, and Parmeliella, it can typically be identified by a unique combination of features. These include the presence of argopsin in its thallus (which turns orange when tested with paraphenylenediamine), its partnership with Scytonema algae (rather than Nostoc), its disc-shaped apothecia without a defined rim, and its distinctive spore-producing sacs that partially react with iodine.

== Habitat and distribution ==
The species of Siphulastrum are confined to cold regions of the Southern Hemisphere. They have been found growing on bark or among epiphytic bryophytes, in thin soil amid bryophytes on boulders, and occasionally on peat-rich soil in sheltered microhabitats.

== Species ==
- Siphulastrum cladinoides C.W.Dodge (1948)
- Siphulastrum granulatum P.M.Jørg. & D.J.Galloway (1992) – Tasmania
- Siphulastrum mamillatum (Hook.f. & Taylor) D.J.Galloway (1983) – Tasmania; New Zealand; southern South America
- Siphulastrum triste Müll.Arg. (1889)
- Siphulastrum usneoides C.W.Dodge (1948)
