= Austrella =

Scientific classification
- Kingdom: Fungi
- Division: Ascomycota
- Class: Lecanoromycetes
- Order: Peltigerales
- Family: Pannariaceae
- Genus: Austrella; P.M.Jørg. (2004)

Type species
- Austrella arachnoidea P.M.Jørg. (2004)

Species
- A. arachnoidea A. brunnea A. isidioidea

Genus of lichen-fungi

Austrella is a small genus of lichen-forming fungi in the family Pannariaceae.

== Taxonomy ==
Austrella was circumscribed in 2004 by Per Magnus Jørgensen. It was set up to accommodate pannarioid lichens with a distinctive combination of features: their spore-bearing sacs (asci) are long and thin-walled and lack the usual starch-reactive "cap" at the tip, and young fruit bodies (apothecia) are edged by a cobweb-like fringe of hyphae (an "arachnoid hyphal weft") that tends to vanish as the apothecia mature. These traits differentiate Austrella from superficially similar genera within the psoromoid group of pannarioid lichens.

Alan Fryday, Damien Ertz and Per Magnus Jørgensen (2017) expanded the concept of the genus by describing Austrella isidioidea from the Falkland Islands and by reporting a Kerguelen collection matching A. arachnoidea in mitochondrial small-subunit (mtSSU) DNA sequence but showing atypical morphology. The Falklands species bears isidioid outgrowths at lobe tips and its apothecia entirely lack the cobwebby margin, whereas the Kerguelen material shows a fully formed, corticate margin in exposed apothecia and a cobwebby edge only on shaded, young ones; some asci there even show a faint iodine-positive ring reminiscent of Psoroma. In short, characters once thought stable in the genus can vary.

Molecular analysis places Austrella within the "Clade 2c" psoromoid group of Pannariaceae, alongside Psoroma (in the strict sense, or sensu stricto) and related genera. In the authors' mtSSU analysis, A. isidioidea and A. arachnoidea did not form a clearly supported group, and relationships in this part of the evolutionary tree were poorly resolved. Since only mtSSU data were available for the new material (RPB1 could not be sequenced), the authors took a conservative approach and relied primarily on morphology, retaining the Falklands species in Austrella on the basis of its characteristic ascus type and general pannarioid features. They suggest that further studies using multiple genes will be needed to clarify the boundaries of the genus and its relationship to Psoroma and its allies.

== Species ==
Three species are accepted in Austrella:

- Austrella arachnoidea P.M.Jørg. (2004)
- Austrella brunnea (P.M.Jørg.) P.M.Jørg. (2004)
- Austrella isidioidea P.M.Jørg. & Fryday (2017)
