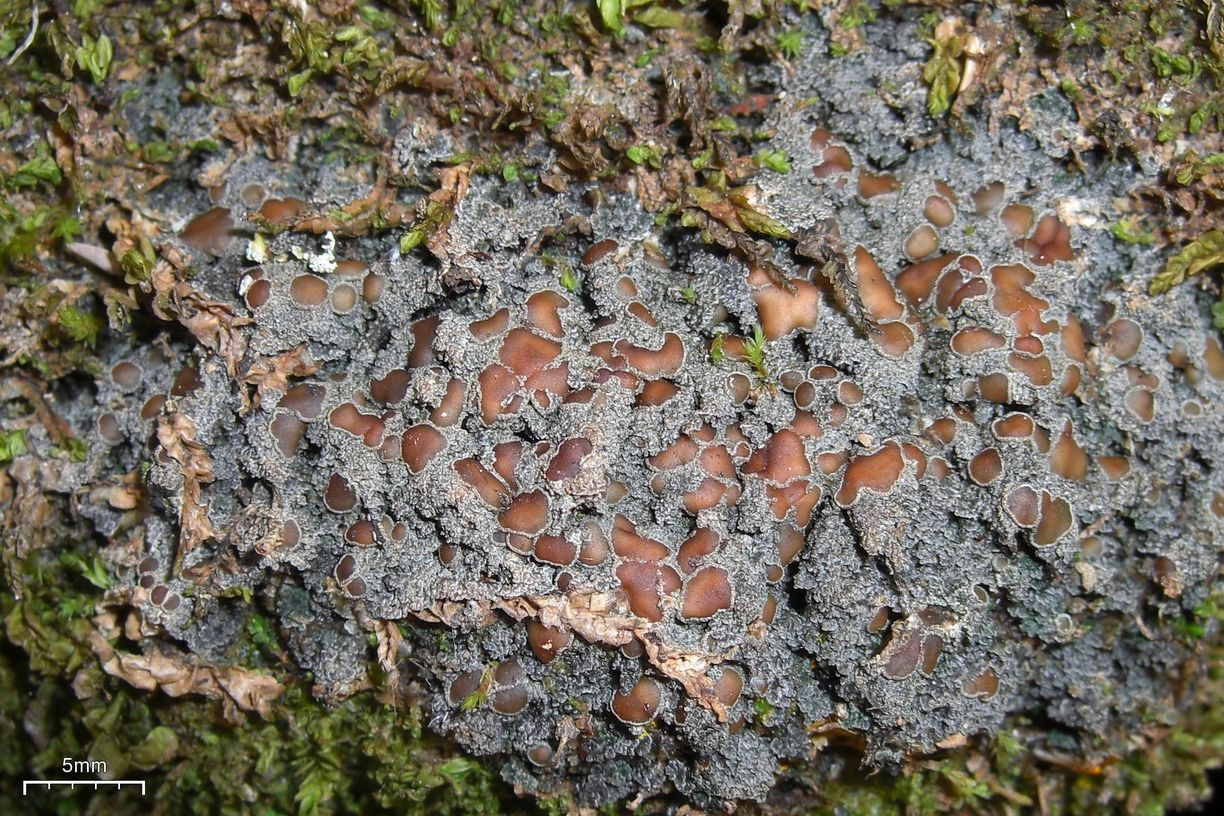

Conservation status
- Secure (NatureServe)

Scientific classification
- Kingdom: Fungi
- Division: Ascomycota
- Class: Lecanoromycetes
- Order: Peltigerales
- Family: Pannariaceae
- Genus: Protopannaria
- Species: P. pezizoides

Binomial name
- Protopannaria pezizoides (Weber) P.M.Jørg. & S.Ekman (2000)

Synonyms
- List: Lichen pezizoides Weber (1778); Parmelia brunnea f. pezizoides (Weber) Fr. (1831); Lecidea thriptophylla var. pezizoides (Weber) Schaer. (1850); Biatora pezizoides (Weber) Opiz (1856); Pannaria pezizoides (Weber) Trevis. (1869); Protoparmelia pezizoides (Weber) Etayo & Nav.-Ros. (2008); Lichen brunneus Sw. (1784); Psora brunnea (Sw.) Hoffm. (1796); Parmelia brunnea (Sw.) Ach. (1803); Lecanora brunnea (Sw.) Ach. (1810); Collema brunneum (Sw.) Mérat (1821); Psoroma brunneum (Sw.) Gray (1821); Zeora brunnea (Sw.) Flot. (1849); Trachyderma brunneum (Sw.) Norman (1852); Pannaria brunnea (Sw.) A.Massal. (1852); Lepidoma brunneum (Sw.) Bagl. (1857); Pannaria nebulosa var. brunnea (Sw.) Boistel (1896); Scutellaria pezizoides Baumg. (1790); Parmelia pezizoides (Baumg.) Mart. (1817); Lecidea microphylla var. pezizoides (Baumg.) Schaer. (1828); Parmelia brunnea var. pezizoides (Baumg.) Fr. (1831); Lecanora pezizoides (Baumg.) Borrer (1843); Pannaria brunnea var. pezizoides (Baumg.) A.Massal. (1852); Lepidoma brunneum var. pezizoides (Baumg.) Bagl. (1857); Verrucaria coronata Hoffm. (1796); Lichen coronatus (Hoffm.) Ach. (1799); Psora coronata (Hoffm.) Hoffm. (1801); Parmelia brunnea var. coronata (Hoffm.) Ach. (1803); Lecanora brunnea var. coronata (Hoffm.) Ach. (1810); Lecanora coronata (Hoffm.) Röhl. (1813); Lichen brunneus * coronata (Hoffm.) Lam. (1813); Lecidea microphylla var. coronata (Hoffm.) Schaer. (1828); Patellaria nebulosa var. coronata (Hoffm.) Wallr. (1831); Parmelia thriptophylla var. coronata (Hoffm.) Fr. (1831); Parmelia thriptophylla f. coronata (Hoffm.) Fr. (1831); Pannaria microphylla var. coronata (Hoffm.) Schaer. (1833); Lecidea coronata (Hoffm.) Borrer ex Hook. (1833); Biatora thriptophylla var. coronata (Hoffm.) Rabenh. (1845); Zeora coronata (Hoffm.) Flot. (1849); Lecidea thriptophylla var. coronata (Hoffm.) Schaer. (1850); Pannaria brunnea var. coronata (Hoffm.) A.Massal. (1852); Lepidoma brunneum var. coronatum (Hoffm.) Bagl. (1857); Biatora coronata (Hoffm.) Th.Fr. (1861); Pannaria pezizoides f. coronata (Hoffm.) Trevis. (1869); Trachyderma nebulosum var. coronatum (Hoffm.) Trevis. (1869); Pannaria brunnea f. coronata (Hoffm.) Arnold (1881); Pannaria nebulosa var. coronata (Hoffm.) H.Olivier (1882); Moelleropsis nebulosa f. coronata (Hoffm.) Gyeln. (1940)

= Protopannaria pezizoides =

Species of lichen

Protopannaria pezizoides, the gray moss-shingle, is a species of squamulose lichen in the family Pannariaceae. It was first described scientifically by the German botanist Georg Heinrich Weber in 1778. It has a long and complex taxonomic history, and has an extensive synonymy. It was transferred to the genus Protopannaria by Per Magnus Jørgensen and Stefan Ekman in 2000; it was assigned as the type species of the genus. Protopannaria pezizoides is widespread, with a continental distribution that includes Africa, Asia, North America, and Oceania. The lichen thrives in moist and/or humid conditions, predominantly found on soil and at the bases of trees, and occasionally on rocks, within forested and arctic-alpine settings. Its photobiont partner is from Nostoc, a genus of cyanobacteria. It does not contain any lichen products, and all standard chemical spot tests are negative.
