= Steineropsis =

Scientific classification
- Domain: Eukaryota
- Kingdom: Fungi
- Division: Ascomycota
- Class: Lecanoromycetes
- Order: Peltigerales
- Family: Pannariaceae
- Genus: Steineropsis; T.Sprib. & Muggia (2010)

Type species
- Steineropsis alaskana T.Sprib. & Muggia (2010)

Genus of lichens

Steineropsis is a genus of lichen-forming fungi in the family Pannariaceae. It has two species. The genus was circumscribed by Toby Spribille and Lucia Muggia in 2010, with Steineropsis alaskana assigned as the type species. The type specimen of this lichen was found in Skagway, Alaska, where it was growing on a rock in a snowbed at an altitude of 1,051 m (3,448 ft). The generic name alludes to a resemblance to the genus Steinera. A second species, Steineropsis laceratula, also found in Alaska, was added to the genus in 2020. Molecular phylogenetic analysis showed that Steineropsis has a sister taxon relationship to genus Protopannaria.

The genus name of Steineropsis is in honour of Julius Steiner (1844–1918), who was an Austrian botanist (Mycology and Lichenology) and teacher. He taught at the k.k. Staatsgymnasium (a State Grammar School) in Vienna.

== Species ==
- Steineropsis alaskana T.Sprib. & Muggia (2010)
- Steineropsis laceratula (Hue) T.Sprib. & Ekman (2020)
