= Xanthopsoroma =

Scientific classification
- Domain: Eukaryota
- Kingdom: Fungi
- Division: Ascomycota
- Class: Lecanoromycetes
- Order: Peltigerales
- Family: Pannariaceae
- Genus: Xanthopsoroma; Elvebakk & S.G.Hong (2010)

Type species
- Xanthopsoroma contextum (Stirt.) Elvebakk & S.G.Hong (2010)

Genus of fungi

Xanthopsoroma is a small genus of lichen-forming fungi in the family Pannariaceae. It contains two species.

Xanthopsoroma was circumscribed as a new genus in 2010 when it was separated from the closely related genus Psoroma. Characteristics of Xanthopsoroma species include the production of usnic acid and a series of distinct triterpenes as well as showing morphological differences from the related Psoroma and Psorophorus.

== Species ==
- Xanthopsoroma contextum (Stirt.) Elvebakk & S.G.Hong (2010)
- Xanthopsoroma soccatum (R.Br. ex Cromb.) Elvebakk (2010)
