= Steineropsis laceratula =

Scientific classification
- Domain: Eukaryota
- Kingdom: Fungi
- Division: Ascomycota
- Class: Lecanoromycetes
- Order: Peltigerales
- Family: Pannariaceae
- Genus: Steineropsis
- Species: S. laceratula

Binomial name
- Steineropsis laceratula (Hue) T.Sprib. & Ekman (2020)

Synonyms
- Pannaria laceratula Hue (1902); Fuscopannaria laceratula (Hue) P.M.Jørg. (1994)

Species of lichen

Steineropsis laceratula is a species of crustose placodioid lichen in the family Pannariaceae. It was first formally described in 1902 by French lichenologist Auguste-Marie Hue as Pannaria laceratula. Per Magnus Jørgensen proposed a transfer to Fuscopannaria in 1994. The taxon shuffled genera again in 2020 by Toby Spribille and Stefan Ekman after molecular phylogenetic analysis of the DNA from specimens collected in Alaska revealed its correct classification in the genus Steineropsis. The type specimen was collected in 1904 from Hakkoda, Japan, at an elevation of 1,200 m (3,900 ft); here the lichen was found growing on the bark of birch, but the species also grows on rock.
