= Santessoniella =

Scientific classification
- Domain: Eukaryota
- Kingdom: Fungi
- Division: Ascomycota
- Class: Lecanoromycetes
- Order: Peltigerales
- Family: Pannariaceae
- Genus: Santessoniella; Henssen

Type species
- Santessoniella polychidioides (Zahlbr.) Henssen

Genus of lichens

Santessoniella is a genus of lichenized fungi in the family Pannariaceae. The classification reflects various changes made based on the Systema Ascomycetum and Myconet in the Deep Hypha issue of Mycologia.

The genus was circumscribed by Aino Marjatta Henssen in Acta Univ. Upsal., Symb. Bot. Upsal. vol.32 (1) on page 76 in 1997.

The genus name of Santessoniella is in honour of Rolf Santesson (1916–2013), who was a Swedish lichenologist and university lecturer.

== Species ==
As accepted by Species Fungorum;

- Santessoniella pulchella P.M. Jørg. (1998)
- Santessoniella rugosa Henssen & Kantvilas (2000)

Former species;

- S. brunnea P.M. Jørg. (1999) = Austrella brunnea
- S. chilensis (Hue) Henssen (1997 = Austroparmeliella chilensis
- S. crossophylla (Tuck.) P.M. Jørg. (2000) = Rockefellera crossophylla
- S. elongata Henssen (1997) = Austroparmeliella elongata
- S. macrospora P.M. Jørg. & Palice (2010) = Psoroma macrosporum
- S. polychidioides (Zahlbr.) Henssen (1997) = Psoroma polychidioides
- S. rosettiformis Henssen (2000) = Austroparmeliella rosettiformis
- S. saximontana T. Sprib., P.M. Jørg. & M. Schultz (2007) = Leciophysma saximontanum
