= Atrophysma =

Scientific classification
- Domain: Eukaryota
- Kingdom: Fungi
- Division: Ascomycota
- Class: Lecanoromycetes
- Order: Peltigerales
- Family: Pannariaceae
- Genus: Atrophysma; T.Sprib. (2020)
- Species: A. cyanomelanos

Binomial name
- Atrophysma cyanomelanos T.Sprib. (2020)

Single-species genus of lichen

Atrophysma is a fungal genus in the family Pannariaceae. It contains the single species Atrophysma cyanomelanos, a crustose lichen found only in Alaska.

== Taxonomy ==
Both the genus and species were described as new to science in 2020 by lichenologist Toby Spribille. The type specimen was discovered in Glacier Bay National Park, where it was found growing on argillite rock on the top of an alpine ridge; this location is typically covered by snow for most of the year. The generic name Atrophysma combines atra ("black") and physma ("to blow up or distend"); the specific epithet, which combines kyanos ("blue") and melas ("black"), alludes to the typical colors of the thallus and ascomata.

The lichen had been discovered previously in a nearby location, Klondike Gold Rush National Historical Park, as part of a similar lichen research survey in that area. It had been tentatively assigned to the genus Santessoniella, but not formally described as a new species. The material found at Glacier Bay National Park was more substantive, allowing for a fuller characterization of the species, as well as molecular phylogenetic analysis. This showed that the lichen belonged to a distinct clade among other members of the Pannariaceae, and so Atrophysma was proposed to contain it.

== Description ==
Atrophysma cyanomelanos is a cyanolichen, meaning that it has cyanobacteria (also known as blue-green algae) as a photobiont partner. The lichen thallus is an olivaceous-brown crust up to 7 cm (2.8 in) in diameter, although neighbouring thalli can coalesce to form larger entities. The thallus resembles a flattened coral with tiny finger-like lobes (measuring 70–150 μm in diameter) protruding through a black hypothallus. It has rounded, black apothecia (sexual reproductive organs), and simple ascospores that measure 11.0–16.0 by 7.1–8.1 μm.
