= Joergensenia =

Scientific classification
- Kingdom: Fungi
- Division: Ascomycota
- Class: Lecanoromycetes
- Order: Peltigerales
- Family: Pannariaceae
- Genus: Joergensenia; Passo, S.Stenroos & Calvelo (2008)
- Species: J. cephalodina

Binomial name
- Joergensenia cephalodina (Zahlbr.) Passo, S.Stenroos & Calvelo (2008)

Synonyms
- Psoroma cephalodinum Zahlbr. (1924)

Single-species lichen genus

Joergensenia is a fungal genus in the family Pannariaceae. It comprises a single species, Joergensenia cephalodina, which is a corticolous (bark-dwelling), squamulose lichen found in southern South America.

== Taxonomy ==
Joergensenia contains a single species, Joergensenia cephalodina, which was originally described as Psoroma cephalodinum by Alexander Zahlbruckner in 1924. The genus was established in 2008 by the lichenologists Alfredo Passo, Soili Stenroos, and Susana Calvelo to accommodate this species, which phylogenetic analysis showed was only distantly related to Psoroma and Pannaria.

The genus is Joergensenia characterised by its squamulose to almost foliose thallus, conspicuous cephalodia containing the cyanobacterium Scytonema, and distinctive ascus structure. The ascus apex has a strong amyloid reaction revealing a compact cap-shaped plug, which differs from the apical structures found in other Pannariaceae genera.

Chemically, Joergensenia contains pannarin. Its phylogenetic position and morphological features, particularly the ascus structure and cephalodia, distinguish it from other genera in the family. Molecular phylogenetic analyses place Joergensenia in a basal position within the Pannariaceae, grouping with genera like Parmeliella and Degelia rather than with the core Psoroma-Pannaria clade.

The genus is named in honour of Per Magnus Jørgensen, a Norwegian lichenologist who made significant contributions to the taxonomy of the Pannariaceae. Joergensenia is known to occur only in southern South America, including Chile's Juan Fernández Islands.

== Description ==
Genus Joergensenia has a heteromerous thallus, meaning it has distinct layers. The thallus is squamulose (composed of small, scale-like structures) to small-foliose (leaf-like), and can be loosely or closely attached to the substrate. It typically grows in a circular pattern on tree bark. The genus is distinguished by the presence of a thin, black prothallus (a film-like structure at the edge of the thallus) which is rarely absent. The main photobiont (the photosynthetic partner in the lichen symbiosis) is a green alga, likely from the genus Myrmecia. A key feature of Joergensenia is the presence of conspicuous cephalodia. These are specialised structures containing cyanobacteria, in this case from the genus Scytonema, which can fix nitrogen. The cephalodia grow over the thallus surface.

The apothecia (fruiting bodies) are lecanorine in form, meaning they have a rim (called the thalline exciple) that contains algal cells and looks similar to the thallus. The hymenium (the fertile layer containing the asci) turns blue when stained with iodine. The asci (spore-producing structures) have a distinctive internal amyloid cap-shaped plug at their apex, visible when stained with iodine. This ascus structure is unique within the Pannariaceae. This type, with a completely amyloid axial chamber, was later termed Joergensenia-type; it is one of five unique ascus structures that have been reported in the order Peltigerales].

The sole species, J. cephalodina, forms a thallus up to 3 cm in diameter. The individual squamules are up to 3 mm long, initially rounded but becoming incised (cut into) and somewhat elongated at the thallus margin, giving mature specimens a placodioid (forming a crust-like rosette) appearance. The upper surface is smooth to slightly irregular, often with a whitish bloom (pruina), especially in older parts. It appears pale green when wet and whitish when dry. The lower surface is attached to the substrate, brown to dark brown centrally, and lacks root-like structures (rhizines).

The cephalodia are particularly noticeable in this species, growing up to 4 mm in diameter. They are bluish-grey, often with a whitish bloom, and have a wrinkled surface with ridges converging towards the centre. The apothecia are 1–2 mm in diameter, with an orange to dark brown, often pruinose disc. The margin is thick and crenulated (with small rounded projections). The ascospores are hyaline (colourless), ellipsoid to more or less spherical, measuring 15–19 by 9–12 μm, with a distinctly wrinkled outer wall (epispore).

Chemically, J. cephalodina contains pannarin, which gives a distinctive orange reaction with para-phenylenediamine (a common spot test for lichen substances).

== Habitat and distribution ==
Joergensenia cephalodina is a corticolous lichen, meaning it grows on the bark of trees. It has a restricted distribution, known only from southern South America, including southern Argentina, southern Chile, and Chile's Juan Fernández Islands.

In Argentina, the species has been recorded in the provinces of Río Negro and Neuquén, which are part of northern Patagonia. Specific locations include Puerto Blest and Laguna Ortiz Basualdo. In these areas, J. cephalodina has been found growing on the bark of Nothofagus dombeyi (Coihue) and Saxegothaea conspicua (Prince Albert's Yew).

In Chile, besides its type locality in the Juan Fernández Islands (specifically on Masatierra Island, now called Robinson Crusoe Island), the species has been collected in the Los Lagos Region (X Región). It was found in Antillanca, growing on Nothofagus pumilio (Lenga beech).

The Juan Fernández Islands, where the species was first discovered, are known for their high level of endemism in both flora and fauna. The specimen from this location was found in a Drimys (Winter's bark) forest, suggesting an affinity for cool, humid environments.

The distribution pattern of J. cephalodina indicates a preference for temperate Valdivian and Magellanic rainforest ecosystems. These forests are characterised by cool temperatures, high rainfall, and high humidity, conditions that generally favour lichen growth. The species' association with Nothofagus trees, which are dominant in these forest types, further supports this ecological preference.
