= Phormopsora =

Scientific classification
- Domain: Eukaryota
- Kingdom: Fungi
- Division: Ascomycota
- Class: Lecanoromycetes
- Order: Peltigerales
- Family: Pannariaceae
- Genus: Phormopsora; Elvebakk, S.G.Hong & C.H.Park (2020)
- Species: P. isabellina

Binomial name
- Phormopsora isabellina (Vain.) Elvebakk, S.G.Hong & C.H.Park (2020)

Synonyms
- Psoroma isabellinum Vain. (1899); Pannaria isabellina (Vain.) Elvebakk & Bjerke (2005)

Single-species lichen genus

Phormopsora is a fungal genus in the family Pannariaceae. It comprises a single species, Phormopsora isabellina. The genus was proposed in 2020 based on molecular and morphological studies of a lichen previously classified in the genera Psoroma and Pannaria. Phormopsora is characterised by its large, scale-like structures called squamules that form pale grey rosettes, and by the presence of unique lichen substances not found in other members of its family. The species is primarily found in southern South America, particularly in Chile, where it grows on the trunks of evergreen Nothofagus trees in humid, temperate rainforests. Its distinctive features include well-developed structures containing nitrogen-fixing cyanobacteria, and spores with a distinctive outer wall that has irregular swellings and thread-like extensions at the tips.

== Taxonomy ==
Both the genus Phormopsora and its species were described as new to science in 2020 by the lichenologists Arve Elvebakk, Soon Gyu Hong, and Chae Haeng Park. The genus name comes from the Greek words phormós meaning 'mat' and psora meaning 'scale', referring to its thallus of large, often intertwining squamules.

Phormopsora isabellina was originally described as Psoroma isabellinum by Edvard August Vainio in 1899, based on a specimen collected in Chile. The holotype specimen was collected by Franz Wilhelm Neger in 1897 at an elevation of 1,000 m (3,300 ft) in the Andean forest regions of Chile. It is housed in the herbarium of the University of Turku (TUR-V), with an isotype in the Botanische Staatssammlung München (M).

The taxon was later transferred to the genus Pannaria as Pannaria isabellina by Elvebakk and Bjerke in 2005. Molecular phylogenetics analysis in 2020, based on internal transcribed spacer, nuclear large subunit rRNA, mitochondrial small subunit rRNA, and MCM7 genes, showed it formed a distinct lineage separate from Pannaria, leading to its placement in the new genus Phormopsora.

The species epithet isabellina refers to the isabelline (pale grayish-yellow) colour of the lichen thallus.

Phormopsora is distinguished from related genera in the Pannariaceae by its content of norstictic and connorstictic acids (unique in the family), large branched chlorobiont squamules with large foliose cephalodia, and bullate perispores with long apiculate extensions.

Phylogenetically, Phormopsora forms a sister group to the genus Pannaria. In multi-locus analyses, it clusters with the genus Hispidopannaria, and together they form a sister group to Pannaria. However, this relationship is not consistently maintained across all single-gene phylogenies, indicating a complex evolutionary history.

== Description ==
Phormopsora is characterised by a thallus that is large-squamulose, meaning it is composed of small, scale-like structures called squamules. These squamules are typically 2–5 cm (0.8–2.0 in) in diameter, irregularly branched, and form pale grey rosettes. The thallus is often surrounded by a distinct prothallus, which is a thin layer of fungal hyphae extending beyond the main body of the lichen. The upper cortex, or outer layer, of the squamules is paraplectenchymatous, consisting of fungal cells with thick walls arranged in a tissue-like manner.

A unique feature of Phormopsora is the presence of large, placodioid to foliose cephalodia. Cephalodia are specialised structures containing cyanobacteria, which are capable of fixing nitrogen. In Phormopspora, these structures are particularly well-developed and can be easily seen on the lichen surface.

Apothecia (fruiting bodies) are common in Phormopsora. They have rufous brown discs (the spore-producing surface) with crenulate-striate margins, meaning the edges are finely notched and grooved. The hymenium, the fertile layer of the apothecium, turns blue when treated with iodine (IKI+ blue).

The asci, structures that produce and contain spores, do not have internal amyloid structures (structures that turn blue-black when treated with iodine). The spores themselves are ellipsoid and surrounded by a distinctive perispore (outer spore wall). This perispore is described as gibbose, meaning it has irregular swellings or protuberances, and features long, filiform (thread-like) extensions at the tips.

Phormopsora is notable for its unique chemistry among the family Pannariaceae. It contains norstictic and connorstictic acids, which can be detected through thin-layer chromatography. These lichen substances are not found in any other genus within the family, making them a key diagnostic feature for Phormopsora.

== Habitat and distribution ==
Phormopsora isabellina is primarily found in southern South America, with its main distribution in Chile and a single reported occurrence in Argentina. The species is most common in the Los Lagos (X) and Aisén (XI) regions of Chile, becoming rarer in the Magallanes (XII) region further south. Its northern limit is in the Nahuelbuta National Park in the Araucanía (IX) region. P. isabellina is closely associated with evergreen forests, particularly those dominated by Nothofagus betuloides and N. dombeyi. It is almost exclusively found growing on the trunks of these evergreen Nothofagus species, demonstrating a strong preference for this specific habitat. The lichen grows in the humid, temperate rainforest environments characteristic of these regions, typically at moderate elevations.
