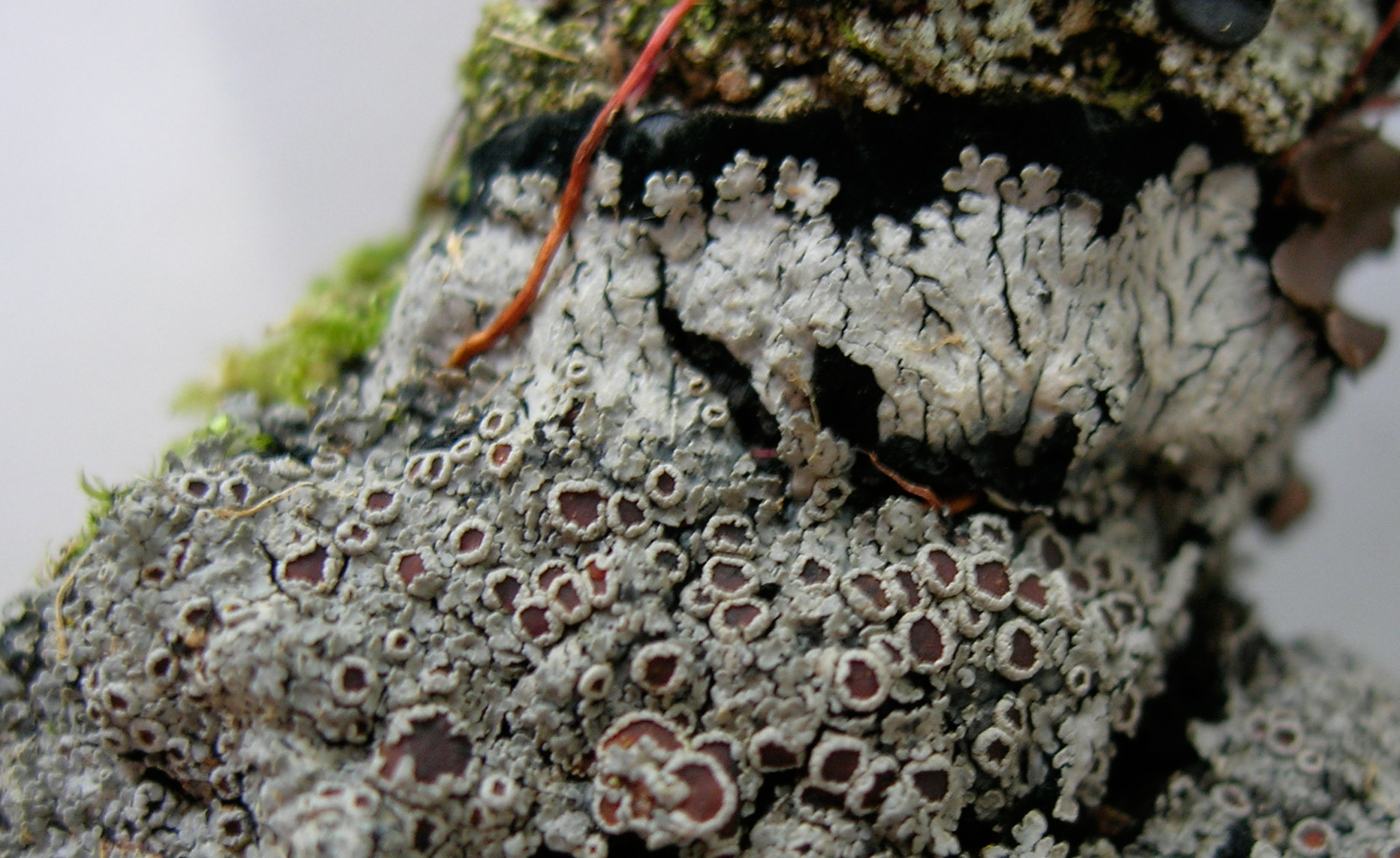

Scientific classification
- Domain: Eukaryota
- Kingdom: Fungi
- Division: Ascomycota
- Class: Lecanoromycetes
- Order: Peltigerales
- Family: Pannariaceae
- Genus: Lepidocollema
- Species: L. marianum

Binomial name
- Lepidocollema marianum (Fr.) P.M.Jørg. (2014)

Synonyms
- Parmelia mariana Fr. (1825); Pannaria mariana (Fr.) Müll.Arg. (1887); Parmeliella mariana (Fr.) P.M.Jørg. & D.J.Galloway (1992)

= Lepidocollema marianum =

Species of lichen

Lepidocollema marianum is a species of cyanolichen in the family Pannariaceae. It was first scientifically described by Elias Fries in 1825 as Parmelia mariana. Per Magnus Jørgensen transferred it to the genus Lepidocollema in 2014 following a molecular phylogenetics-guided revision of the Pannariaceae.

The lichen has a growth form that is both squamulose (scaley) and foliose (leafy), with lobes around the margins and squamules in the centre of the thallus. It is firmly attached to the underlying substratum by root-like rhizines, which are brown to black in colour; the hypothallus is also black.

Lepidocollema marianum occurs in Asia (including Thailand, Sri Lanka, and Taiwan) and Mauritius.
