= Psoroma absconditum =

Scientific classification
- Kingdom: Fungi
- Division: Ascomycota
- Class: Lecanoromycetes
- Order: Peltigerales
- Family: Pannariaceae
- Genus: Psoroma
- Species: P. absconditum

Binomial name
- Psoroma absconditum Øvstedal (2008)
- Holotype: Corinth Head, Heard Island

Species of lichen

Psoroma absconditum is a species of squamulose (scaly) lichen in the family Pannariaceae. It forms small patches of pale brown scales up to 2 cm across, often with distinctive brown disc-shaped fruiting bodies that can reach 4 mm in diameter. The lichen is known only from remote subantarctic islands in the southern Indian Ocean, where it grows among moss cushions in cold, windy conditions.

== Taxonomy ==
Psoroma absconditum was described as new to science by Dag Øvstedal in a study of the lichens of sub-Antarctic Heard Island. The holotype was collected near the top of Corinth Head (107 m elevation) in 2001 by Nicolaas Gremmen. The species had previously been noted only as Psoroma sp.; comparison with related taxa showed that it is distinct, although immature material can resemble P. asperellum, which has narrower, more erect squamules and larger spores. The species epithet absconditum refers to its sunken fruiting bodies that are partly obscured by squamules.

== Description ==
The lichen forms a small thallus up to about 2 cm across, made of pale-brown, shallowly incised squamules (scales) that are attached to the substrate but may lift slightly at the tips (adnate to subascending). Apothecia (disc-like sexual fruiting bodies) are infrequent; they start cup-shaped and bright brown, then expand to about 2–4 mm diameter with a thin, wrinkled thalline margin and a deep-brown, slightly concave disc. Microscopy shows a hymenium 120–160 micrometres (μm) tall and a cortex of tightly packed cells; the eight ascospores per ascus are 13–16 × 9–11 μm and have a subtly roughened surface (minutely rugulose). No lichen products were detected by chemical tests.

Small, compressed cephalodia (specialised structures housing the cyanobacterium Nostoc) occur among and on the squamules; these contribute to nitrogen fixation and are bluish-brown with finger-like projections. In the field the species can be picked out by its low, tightly packed squamules, the relatively large brown apothecia when present, and the lack of detectable secondary metabolites.

== Habitat and distribution ==
Psoroma absconditum grows among moss cushions, especially in tufts of Ditrichum cf. immersum. Mature squamules and apothecia are usually at ground level, with a few small squamules climbing the lower moss stems. It is known from sub-Antarctic Heard Island and the Kerguelen Islands, occurring from low elevations to at least 340–600 m in cold, windy habitats typical of these oceanic islands.
