= Protopannaria campbellensis =

Scientific classification
- Domain: Eukaryota
- Kingdom: Fungi
- Division: Ascomycota
- Class: Lecanoromycetes
- Order: Peltigerales
- Family: Pannariaceae
- Genus: Protopannaria
- Species: P. campbellensis

Binomial name
- Protopannaria campbellensis Øvstedal & Fryday (2011)

Species of lichen

Protopannaria campbellensis is a rare species of lichen in the family Pannariaceae. It is found in the southern New Zealand shelf islands. It is unique due to its specific structure and lack of lichen products, which are typically found in related species. The lichen is found in wet grasslands and upland peat bogs.

== Taxonomy ==
Protopannaria campbellensis was first described as a new species by Dag Øvstedal and Alan Fryday in 2011. The type specimen was discovered on the summit of Mount Dumas on Campbell Island, New Zealand, at an altitude of 503 m (1,650 ft). The species name, campbellensis, refers to its discovery location.

== Description ==
This lichen species has a brown, heteromerous thallus that forms tufts up to 4–5 cm (1.6–2.0 in) across. It consists of overlapping squamules, with the inner parts being erect, terete, and 4–5 mm high. The marginal squamules are cuneiform and can be up to 2 mm wide with irregular projections. The photobiont (the photosynthetic partner) in this lichen is a cyanobacterium called Nostoc, which has individual cells measuring 3–5 μm in diameter. No lichen products have been detected in Protopannaria campbellensis, which sets it apart from other species in the genus Protopannaria.

Protopannaria campbellensis can be distinguished from similar species, such as P. alcicornis and P. austro-orcadensis, by its broader and flattened marginal lobes and the absence of a distinct lower cortex.

== Habitat and distribution ==
This lichen species is known only from the summits of mountains on the southern New Zealand shelf islands, specifically Campbell Island and Auckland Island. The type specimen was found growing on acidic soil, while other specimens have been found on montane rocks. Protopannaria campbellensis has not been reported from other nearby islands or mainland New Zealand.
