= Fuscoderma papuanum =

Scientific classification
- Kingdom: Fungi
- Division: Ascomycota
- Class: Lecanoromycetes
- Order: Peltigerales
- Family: Pannariaceae
- Genus: Fuscoderma
- Species: F. papuanum

Binomial name
- Fuscoderma papuanum P.M.Jørg. & Sipman (2002)

Species of lichen

Fuscoderma papuanum is a species of squamulose (scaley) lichen in the family Pannariaceae. Endemic to Papua New Guinea, it was formally described as a new species in 2002 by lichenologists Per Magnus Jørgensen and Harrie Sipman. The type specimen was collected in Myola, in the Owen Stanley Range (Oro Province) at an altitude between 2,400 and 2,800 m (7,900 and 9,200 ft). Here, in the cool, moist habitat of a montane forest dominated by coniferous trees from the genera Phyllocladus and Podocarpus, it was found growing on a bank of the Iora Creek. It is similar to the type of genus Fuscoderma, F. applanatum, but is distinguished from that species by its smaller size, narrower, smooth lobes, and by the black rhizines on the thallus underside that, in young specimens, protrude out beyond the thallus.
