= Austroparmeliella =

Scientific classification
- Kingdom: Fungi
- Division: Ascomycota
- Class: Lecanoromycetes
- Order: Peltigerales
- Family: Pannariaceae
- Genus: Austroparmeliella (P.M.Jørg.) P.M.Jørg. (2014)

Type species
- Austroparmeliella lacerata (P.M.Jørg.) P.M.Jørg. (2014)

Species
- A. chilensis A. elongata A. lacerata A. rakiurae A. rosettiformis

Synonyms
- Parmeliella sect. Austroparmeliella P.M.Jørg. (2004)

Genus of lichen-forming fungi

Austroparmeliella is a genus of lichen-forming fungi in the family Pannariaceae. It consists of five species, all of which are found in the Southern Hemisphere, with records from Chile, Argentina, South Africa, and New Zealand. These lichens form distinctive lace-like bluish-grey crusts made up of small, deeply lobed leaf-like structures, and partner with cyanobacteria rather than green algae.

== Taxonomy ==
Austroparmeliella was first proposed by the Norwegian lichenologist Per Magnus Jørgensen in 2004 as a section of the genus Parmeliella. He promoted it to generic status in 2014 as part of a larger molecular phylogenetics analysis of the family Pannariaceae.

== Description ==
Genus Austroparmeliella consists of lichens that form a distinctive lace-like crust on the surfaces they inhabit. The thallus is typically bluish-grey in colour and is made up of small, leaf-like structures called squamules. These squamules are usually deeply lobed and measure 2–3 mm in width, with a thickness of up to 75 micrometres (μm). The upper surface of the thallus is covered by a thin, cellular layer called the cortex, which is 10–15 μm thick. Beneath this layer lies the medulla, a loosely packed region of interwoven fungal filaments (hyphae) that contain clusters of Nostoc—a type of cyanobacteria that forms a symbiotic relationship with the fungus. The lower surface of the thallus may have a single layer of cells forming a cortex, but in some areas, this layer may be absent.

The reproductive structures of Austroparmeliella, the apothecia, are commonly found on the thallus and often occur in clusters. Each apothecium is about 1 mm in diameter and becomes convex as it matures. The apothecia have a red-brown disc at the centre, surrounded by a pale rim. The outer edge of the apothecium, known as the exciple, is made of tightly packed fungal cells (paraplectenchymatous) and is 30–50 μm wide.

Inside the apothecium, the subhymenium—a layer of intricately interwoven hyphae—is colourless and flat, measuring 100–150 μm thick. The hymenium, where the spores are produced, is also 100–150 μm high and stains deep blue when treated with iodine (I+). The spore-producing cells, called asci, are cylindrical and contain eight spores each. The ascospores are colourless, broadly ellipsoid in shape, and have smooth walls. They are non-septate, meaning they lack internal partitions. No pycnidia, which are structures for asexual reproduction, have been observed to occur in Austroparmeliella. Additionally, the genus does not produce any of the typical lichen substances commonly found in other lichens.

== Species ==
As of February 2025, Species Fungorum (in the Catalogue of Life) accept five species of Austroparmeliella:

- Austroparmeliella chilensis (Hue) P.M.Jørg. (2014) – type: Chile
- Austroparmeliella elongata (Henssen) P.M.Jørg. (2014) – type: Argentina
- Austroparmeliella lacerata (P.M.Jørg.) P.M.Jørg. (2014) – type: Republic of South Africa
- Austroparmeliella rakiurae (P.M.Jørg. & D.J.Galloway) P.M.Jørg. (2014) – type: New Zealand
- Austroparmeliella rosettiformis (Henssen) P.M.Jørg. (2014) – type: Chile
