= Psoromidium =

Scientific classification
- Domain: Eukaryota
- Kingdom: Fungi
- Division: Ascomycota
- Class: Lecanoromycetes
- Order: Peltigerales
- Family: Pannariaceae
- Genus: Psoromidium; Stirt. (1877)

Type species
- Psoromidium wellingtonii Stirt. (1877)

Species
- P. aleuroides P. versicolor P. wellingtonii

Synonyms
- Degeliella P.M.Jørg. (2004); Psoromaria Nyl. ex Hue (1891)

Genus of lichen

Psoromidium is a genus of cyanolichens in the family Pannariaceae. It has three species.

== Taxonomy ==
The genus was circumscribed by Scottish naturalist James Stirton in 1877, based on the type species P. wellingtonii (later synonymised with P. aleuroides) collected by John Buchanan near Wellington, New Zealand. The genus belongs to the family Pannariaceaein the order Lecanorales. Psoromidium is closely related to certain elements within the heterogeneous genus Psoroma, but is distinguished by the absence of a photobiont in the apothecial margin. Like Psoroma, it has a green algal photobiont as the main photobiont present in a layer below the upper cortex of the squamules, with Nostoc occurring in scattered, well-defined cephalodia.

The taxonomic history of the genus involves several nomenclatural changes. In 1875, Stirton described Lecidea aleuroides, which would later become the type species of Psoromidium. In 1888, William Nylander described Psoroma descendens (later determined to be identical to L. aleuroides) and suggested a possible new genus Psoromaria for it. In 1894, Müller Argoviensis transferred both P. wellingtonii and L. aleuroides to the genus Phyllopsora. The genus Psoromaria Nyl. was later determined to be a synonym of Psoromidium.

The generic name combines elements suggesting its relationship to Psoroma while indicating its distinct status. The genus is considered a relict of the lichen flora that existed on the Pacific front of Gondwanaland in Cretaceous and Tertiary times, supported by its disjunct distribution pattern and restriction to cool-temperate and subalpine habitats.

== Species ==
- Psoromidium aleuroides (Stirt.) D.J.Galloway (1983)
- Psoromidium versicolor (Müll. Arg.) D.J.Galloway (1983)
- Psoromidium wellingtonii Stirt. (1877)
