= Staurolemma =

Scientific classification
- Kingdom: Fungi
- Division: Ascomycota
- Class: Lecanoromycetes
- Order: Peltigerales
- Family: Pannariaceae
- Genus: Staurolemma; Körb. (1867)

Type species
- Staurolemma dalmaticum Körb. (1867)

Species
- S. carolinianum S. dalmaticum S. dussii S. fruticosum S. oculatum S. orbiculare S. perforatum S. weberi

Genus of lichens

Staurolemma is a genus of lichenized fungi in the family Pannariaceae. The genus was circumscribed by German lichenologist Gustav Wilhelm Körber in 1867, with Staurolemma dalmaticum as the type species.

== Species ==
- Staurolemma carolinianum P.M.Jørg. (2004)
- Staurolemma dalmaticum Körb. (1867)
- Staurolemma dussii (Vain.) P.M.Jørg. & Henssen (1999)
- Staurolemma fruticosum Henssen (1999)
- Staurolemma oculatum P.M.Jørg. & Aptroot (2010)
- Staurolemma orbiculare P.M.Jørg. & Aptroot (2010)
- Staurolemma perforatum P.M.Jørg. (2010)
- Staurolemma weberi Henssen & P.M.Jørg. (1999)
