= Kroswia =

Scientific classification
- Domain: Eukaryota
- Kingdom: Fungi
- Division: Ascomycota
- Class: Lecanoromycetes
- Order: Peltigerales
- Family: Pannariaceae
- Genus: Kroswia; P.M.Jørg. (2002)

Type species
- Kroswia crystallifera P.M.Jørg. (2002)

Species
- K. crystallifera K. epispora K. gemmascens K. polydactyla

Genus of lichens

Kroswia is a genus of lichens in the family Pannariaceae. It consists of four paleotropical species: K. epispora, K. gemmascens, K. polydactyla, and the type, K. crystallifera. Species in the genus are characterized by their gelatinous, homoiomerous (uniform in structure, without differentiation into distinct tissues), and ecorticate (without a cortex) thallus. The ascocarps contain terpenoids and fatty acids. The genus was circumscribed by Norwegian lichenologist Per Magnus Jørgensen in 2002.

The genus name Kroswia honours Hildur Krog (1922–2014), who was a Norwegian botanist and Thomas Douglas Victor Swinscow (1917–1992), a British writer, editor and physician.
