= Homothecium =

Scientific classification
- Domain: Eukaryota
- Kingdom: Fungi
- Division: Ascomycota
- Class: Lecanoromycetes
- Order: Peltigerales
- Family: Pannariaceae
- Genus: Homothecium; A.Massal. (1853)

Type species
- Homothecium opulentum (Mont.) A.Massal. (1853)

Species
- H. chilense H. intermedium H. opulentum H. patagonicum H. sorediosum

Synonyms
- Lecidocollema Vain. (1890)

Genus of lichen

Homothecium is a genus of lichen-forming fungi in the family Pannariaceae.
