= Nebularia (lichen) =

Scientific classification
- Kingdom: Fungi
- Division: Ascomycota
- Class: Lecanoromycetes
- Order: Peltigerales
- Family: Pannariaceae
- Genus: Nebularia; P.M.Jørg. (2014)

Type species
- Nebularia incrassata (P.M.Jørg.) P.M.Jørg. (2014)

Species
- N. incrassata N. psoromoides

Genus of lichens

Nebularia is a small genus of lichen-forming fungi in the family Pannariaceae. It comprises two species, both of which are found in the Andes.

== Taxonomy ==
The genus was circumscribed by the Norwegian lichenologist Per Magnus Jørgensen in 2014. The name Nebularia is derived from the Latin word nebula, meaning 'fog' and the suffix -aris, meaning "belonging to". This reflects the habitat of the species, which typically grow in foggy or cloud forest (selvas nubladas).

== Description ==
Nebularia lichens have a brownish thallus, which is made up of small, scale-like structures called squamules. These squamules are up to 3 mm wide and feature thick, finger-like lobes that are about 0.25 mm wide. The upper surface, or cortex, of the thallus is well-developed and composed of tightly packed cells, reaching up to 70 μm thick. Beneath this cortex lies the medulla, a loosely structured layer around 150 μm thick, made of interwoven fungal filaments (hyphae). Embedded within the medulla are clusters of Nostoc—a type of cyanobacteria that forms a symbiotic relationship with the fungus—each cluster containing cells 5–7 μm in diameter.

The apothecia (fruiting bodies) are up to 1.5 mm in diameter. They are reddish-brown, flat, and have a distinct, paler rim. These structures have a proper exciple, or outer layer, made of tightly packed fungal cells (paraplectenchymatous) and can be up to 80 μm wide. The tissue layer just below the spore-producing area, the subhymenium, is poorly defined, colourless, and contains loosely arranged fungal filaments, with some photobiont (algal) cells penetrating from below. The hymenium—the layer where spores are produced—is up to 150 μm thick and turns deep blue when stained with iodine.

The asci, or spore sacs, are cylindrical and contain eight spores each. These spores are colourless, have a slightly wrinkled surface (rugulose}), and range from roughly spherical (globose) to oval (ellipsoid), without internal divisions (non-septate). No asexual reproductive structures (pycnidia) have been observed to occur in Nebularia, and chemical analysis has revealed no distinctive lichen substances.
