= Hispidopannaria =

Scientific classification
- Domain: Eukaryota
- Kingdom: Fungi
- Division: Ascomycota
- Class: Lecanoromycetes
- Order: Peltigerales
- Family: Pannariaceae
- Genus: Hispidopannaria; Elvebakk, S.G.Hong & C.H.Park (2020)

Type species
- Hispidopannaria hispidula (Nyl.) Elvebakk, S.G.Hong & C.H.Park (2020)

Species
- H. dasyclada H. hispidula

Genus of lichens

Hispidopannaria is a genus of lichen-forming fungi in the family Pannariaceae. It comprises two species, both found exclusively in southern South America. The genus is characterised by its large, leafy structures covered with stiff, bristle-like hairs, giving the lichen a fuzzy appearance. These lichens form symbiotic relationships with both green algae and cyanobacteria, allowing them to photosynthesise. Hispidopannaria was established as a distinct genus in 2020, based on DNA analysis that showed it to be genetically distinct from the closely related genus Pannaria. The two known species inhabit different ecological niches: H. hispidula is found in temperate rainforests across Chile and Argentina, primarily growing on tree bark, while H. dasyclada is endemic to Robinson Crusoe Island in Chile, where it grows on rocks and on soil.

== Taxonomy ==
Hispidopannaria was circumscribed as a new genus in 2020 by Arve Elvebakk, Soon Gyu Hong, and Chae Haeng Park. The type species of the genus is Hispidopannaria hispidula, which was originally described as Psoroma hispidulum by William Nylander in 1855 and later transferred to Pannaria as Pannaria hispidula (Nyl.) Hue in 1902. The genus name Hispidopannaria is derived from the Latin word hispidus, meaning 'covered by coarse, rigid hairs', combined with its relationship to Pannaria, reflecting the characteristic hispid squamules (scales) that distinguish this genus from its relatives.

The genus was established based on molecular phylogenetic analyses of the internal transcribed spacer, nuclear large subunit rRNA, mitochondrial small subunit rRNA, and MCM7 genes. Prior to its recognition as a distinct genus, species now classified under Hispidopannaria were included within the genus Pannaria.

Phylogenetic studies have shown that Hispidopannaria forms a monophyletic clade that is distinct from Pannaria and other genera within the Pannariaceae. In multilocus phylogenetic analyses, Hispidopannaria consistently appears as a sister group to the genus Phormopsora. Together, Hispidopannaria and Phormopsora form a monophyletic clade that is sister to the genus Pannaria in some analyses, although this relationship can vary depending on the genetic markers used and the phylogenetic methods employed.

The recognition of Hispidopannaria as a separate genus has contributed to a more precise circumscription of Pannaria and has helped to resolve some of the polyphyly previously observed within the broader Pannaria group.

== Description ==
Hispidopannaria lichens form large, leafy structures called thalli that can reach 5–30 cm (2.0–11.8 in) in diameter. These thalli are composed of small, scale-like structures known as squamules, which are arranged vertically and grow from a dark underlying layer called the hypothallus. A distinctive feature of Hispidopannaria is its hispid surface – covered with stiff, bristle-like hairs that are 60–100 μm long and 5–10 μm thick, giving the lichen a fuzzy appearance.

The lichen body is composed of multiple layers, including a protective upper cortex and a layer containing green algae of the genus Trebouxia, which serve as the lichen's primary photosynthetic partner. Hispidopannaria also associates with cyanobacteria (blue-green algae) of the genus Nostoc, which form distinct structures called cephalodia scattered among the squamules.

Hispidopannaria reproduces sexually through disc-shaped structures called apothecia, which are 1–3.5 mm wide. These produce spores surrounded by a protective layer called a perispore, which has a distinctive structure in this genus. Chemically, some species contain a secondary metabolite (lichen product) called pannarin, while others lack any detectable compounds. This unique combination of features sets Hispidopannaria apart from related genera in the family Pannariaceae.

== Habitat and distribution ==
Hispidopannaria contains two species, both of which are found exclusively in southern South America. These lichens inhabit different ecological niches within this region. Hispidopannaria hispidula is the more widespread of the two species. It occurs in temperate rainforests of central and southern Chile, with some occurrences in corresponding latitudes of Argentina. The species has been collected from various locations, ranging from the Araucanía Region in central Chile to the Magallanes Region in the far south. It shows a particular concentration in the coastal forests south of Valdivia in the Los Ríos Region. H. hispidula primarily grows on tree bark (corticolous) in humid forest environments. While it has been found on various tree species, it shows a preference for the trunks of evergreen Nothofagus species, particularly N. dombeyi. Some specimens have been collected from deciduous Nothofagus pumilio forests and, in one instance, from the bark of the conifer Pilgerodendron uviferum.

In contrast, Hispidopannaria dasyclada has a much more restricted distribution. It is endemic to Robinson Crusoe Island (formerly known as Más a Tierra) in the Juan Fernández Archipelago, which belongs to Chile. Unlike its widespread relative, H. dasyclada is not typically found on tree bark. Instead, it grows on rock outcrops and humus-rich soil in relatively exposed areas. It has been collected from various elevations on the island, ranging from around 350 to 500 m (1,150 to 1,640 ft) above sea level. The habitats of H. dasyclada appear to be somewhat drier and more sun-exposed than those typically inhabited by H. hispidula on the mainland.

== Species ==
- Hispidopannaria dasyclada (Zahlbr.) Elvebakk (2020)
- Hispidopannaria hispidula (Nyl.) Elvebakk, S.G.Hong & C.H.Park (2020)
