= Rockefellera =

Conservation status
- Endangered (IUCN 3.1)

Scientific classification
- Kingdom: Fungi
- Division: Ascomycota
- Class: Lecanoromycetes
- Order: Peltigerales
- Family: Pannariaceae
- Genus: Rockefellera; Lendemer & E.Tripp (2017)
- Species: R. crossophylla

Binomial name
- Rockefellera crossophylla (Tuck.) Lendemer & E.Tripp (2017)

Synonyms
- Pannaria crossophylla Tuck. (1860); Trachyderma crossophyllum (Tuck.) Trevis. (1869); Pannularia crossophylla (Tuck.) Nyl. (1891); Parmeliella crossophylla (Tuck.) G.Merr. & Burnham (1922); Santessoniella crossophylla (Tuck.) P.M.Jørg. (2000); Santessoniella crossophylla (Tuck.) P.M.Jørg. (2005)

Single-species fungal genus

Rockefellera is a fungal genus in the family Pannariaceae, containing the single species Rockefellera crossophylla. This rare lichen is endemic to eastern North America, where it grows exclusively on large acidic rock overhangs that maintain high humidity. Originally described from New England in 1860 by Edward Tuckerman, the species was believed extinct until populations were rediscovered in the early 2000s. It is known from only 15 populations, primarily in the southern Appalachian Mountains and Ozark Highlands, and is classified as endangered by the IUCN.

== Taxonomy ==
The genus was circumscribed by the American lichenologists James Lendemer and Erin Tripp in 2017. The generic name honors the Rockefeller family, "for their century-long support of North American conservation efforts, particularly with respect to national parks".

Rockefellera crossophylla was originally described by American lichenologist Edward Tuckerman as Pannaria crossophylla, based on specimens he collected in New England. He had previously mentioned the species in an 1859 publication by William Nylander, but this was not a validly published name as a type was not indicated.

== Description ==
Rockefellera is distinguished from the closely related genus Protopannaria by having minutely digitate lobes, biatorine apothecia with hymenia that are hemiamyloid, asci that have internal apical ring structures, and smooth ascospores.

== Habitat and distribution ==
Because of a dearth of records of the lichen from North America after its initial description, Per Magnus Jørgensen suggested in 2000 that it was potentially extinct in the wild on that continent. Since then several populations have been reported from the Canadian Maritimes, the Ozark Highlands, and the southern Appalachian Mountains. The species has been documented across eastern North America, with historical records from Quebec, Nova Scotia, Arkansas, Illinois, Indiana, Missouri, New Hampshire, New York, North Carolina, Pennsylvania, Tennessee, Vermont, and West Virginia. However, its range has contracted significantly in recent decades. As of the early 2020s, only 15 extant populations are known, primarily concentrated in the Southern Appalachian Mountains and Ozark Highlands. The majority of these populations are found within a roughly 1,000 square kilometer area of Great Smoky Mountains National Park. Despite extensive field surveys by lichenologists, many historical populations, particularly those in New England and the central Appalachians, have not been relocated.

Rockefellera crossophylla has specific habitat requirements, occurring exclusively at the bases of large acidic rock overhangs. These sites must maintain relatively high and consistent humidity levels. The species appears unable to colonize rock formations that are either too small or lack sufficient overhang depth. This habitat specificity may partially explain the lichen's rarity across its range.

== Conservation ==
As of the early 2020s, no formal conservation measures protect R. crossophylla populations. The species has experienced significant decline across its range, with many previously documented populations now extirpated. While new populations have been discovered in recent decades, particularly in the southern Appalachians, these likely represent detection of existing populations rather than range expansion.

Priority conservation actions include legal protection at state and federal levels, regular population monitoring, ecological research to understand habitat requirements, and continued field surveys to locate additional populations. While the species receives passive protection within Great Smoky Mountains National Park, populations outside protected areas remain vulnerable to habitat loss.

Both natural factors (such as invasive species altering forest composition) and human activities (including logging and infrastructure development) threaten remaining populations through irreversible changes to required humidity and environmental conditions.
