= Fuscoderma =

Scientific classification
- Domain: Eukaryota
- Kingdom: Fungi
- Division: Ascomycota
- Class: Lecanoromycetes
- Order: Peltigerales
- Family: Pannariaceae
- Genus: Fuscoderma (D.J.Galloway & P.M.Jørg.) P.M.Jørg. & D.J.Galloway (1989)

Type species
- Fuscoderma applanatum (D.J.Galloway & P.M.Jørg.) P.M.Jørg. & D.J.Galloway (1989)

Species
- F. applanatum F. papuanum

Synonyms
- Leioderma subgen. Fuscoderma D.J.Galloway & P.M.Jørg. (1987)

Genus of lichens

Fuscoderma is a genus of lichenized fungi in the family Pannariaceae. It was originally circumscribed as a subgenus of the genus Leioderma by David Galloway and Per Magnus Jørgensen in 1987. The same authors promoted it to generic status a couple of years later in 1989. The New Guinean species F. papuanum was added to the genus in 2002.
