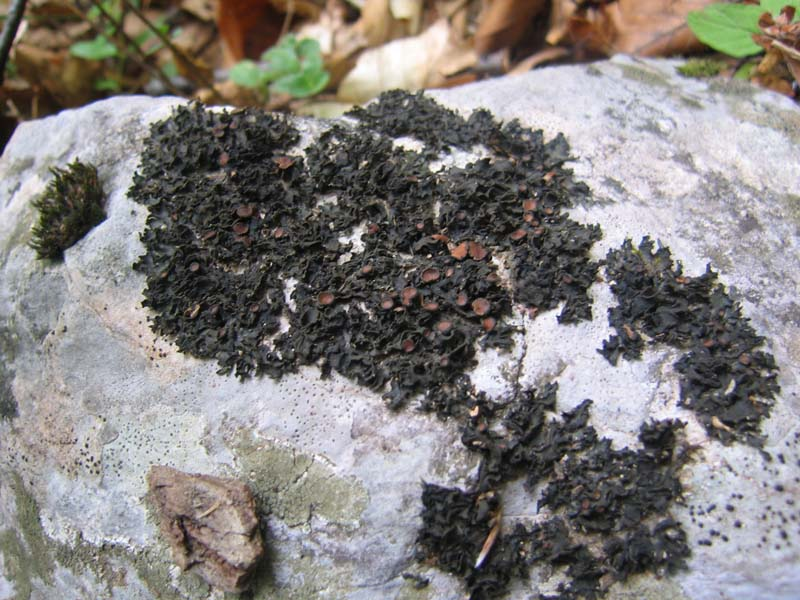
- Foliose lichen containing cyanobacteria

Scientific classification
- Kingdom: Fungi
- Division: Ascomycota
- Class: Lecanoromycetes
- Order: Peltigerales
- Suborder: Collematineae; Miądl. & Lutzoni, 2004

= Collematineae =

Suborder of fungi

The Collematineae are an suborder of rust fungi in the order of Peltigerales in the class Lecanoromycetes.

It contains 5 families, the Coccocarpiaceae, the Collemataceae, the Pannariaceae, the Placynthiaceae and also the Vahliellaceae.

== History ==
It was set up in 2004 to contain 4 families, the Coccocarpiaceae, the Collemataceae, the Pannariaceae and the Placynthiaceae by Miadlikowska & Lutzoni. The new suborder was agreed by Hibbet et al, in 2007 and Lumbsch and Huhndorf in 2007, and 2010. The other Peltigerales based suborder of Peltigerineae contained 6 families; Koerberiaceae, Lobariaceae, Massalongiaceae, Nephromataceae, Peltigeraceae and Vahliellaceae, also by Miadlikowska & Lutzoni in 2004.

Vahliellaceae is still sometimes placed within the Peltigerineae suborder.

A molecular phylogenetic study of the Collemataceae was carried out in 2010. It found that ascospore characteristics are a good predictor of phylogeny within Collematineae.

Relationships in the Collematineae were then defined by short branches and lower nodal support than in other parts of the genetic tree, due in part to conflicting signal in exon trees (DNA sequence within a gene), suggesting that rapid diversification events took place in the early evolution of the suborder.

== Description ==
It includes species of cyanolichens with foliose to fruticose or crustose thalli, with simple or septate ascospores.

== Distribution ==
The lichens occur worldwide, having a cosmopolitan distribution. They are found in south-east Asia, including Thailand,

Collematineae are found growing on bark, moss, soil or rocks in humid woodland including mangrove forests,

== Families ==
Amount of species as accepted by Species Fungorum;

- Coccocarpiaceae - 4 genera and 28 spp.
- Collemataceae - 10 genera and ca. 245 spp.
- Pannariaceae - 27 genera and ca. 360 spp.
- Placynthiaceae - 3 genera and 23 spp.
- Vahliellaceae - 1 genus Vahliella with 9 species
