= Leciophysma =

Scientific classification
- Kingdom: Fungi
- Division: Ascomycota
- Class: Lecanoromycetes
- Order: Peltigerales
- Family: Pannariaceae
- Genus: Leciophysma; Th.Fr. (1865)

Type species
- Leciophysma finmarkicum Th.Fr. (1865)

Species
- L. finmarkicum L. parvum L. saximontanum L. subantarcticum

Genus of lichens

Leciophysma is a genus of cyanolichens in the family Pannariaceae. It has four species. The genus was circumscribed by Theodor Magnus Fries in 1865, with Leciophysma finmarkicum assigned as the type species.

== Species ==
- Leciophysma finmarkicum Th.Fr. (1865)
- Leciophysma parvum Øvstedal (2011)
- Leciophysma saximontanum (T.Sprib., P.M.Jørg. & M.Schultz) P.M.Jørg., Wedin & S.Ekman (2014)
- Leciophysma subantarcticum Henssen (2007)

The species once known as Leciophysma fennicum Räsänen (1939) is now Lempholemma intricatum.
