= Aberratus =

Scientific classification
- Kingdom: Fungi
- Division: Ascomycota
- Class: Lecanoromycetes
- Order: Peltigerales
- Genus: Aberratus; W.L.Strong (2024)
- Species: A. vittathallus

Binomial name
- Aberratus vittathallus W.L.Strong (2024)

Genus of lichens

Aberratus is a fungal genus of uncertain familial placement in the order Peltigerales. It consists of the single species Aberratus vittathallus, a cyanolichen found in the Southern Yukon. The lichen has a foliose (leafy) growth form with a cyanobacterial partner and a gelatin-rich, more or less uniformly mixed internal tissue (medulla), features that are consistent with inclusion in the Peltigerales even though it does not sit comfortably in any currently recognised family. It forms very long, pale, ribbon-like thalli that can reach about 66 cm (26 in) in length; in the fresh state these bands are off-white, but when they dry they contract, become translucent and brittle, shed water, turn light tan, and appear moribund. No sexual or vegetative reproductive structures have been observed, and the species may persist only through the breaking off of thallus fragments. Its unusual morphology, restricted and patchy occurrence at the type locality, and apparent rarity have been interpreted as pointing to a relatively recent, chance origin of the lichen symbiosis.
