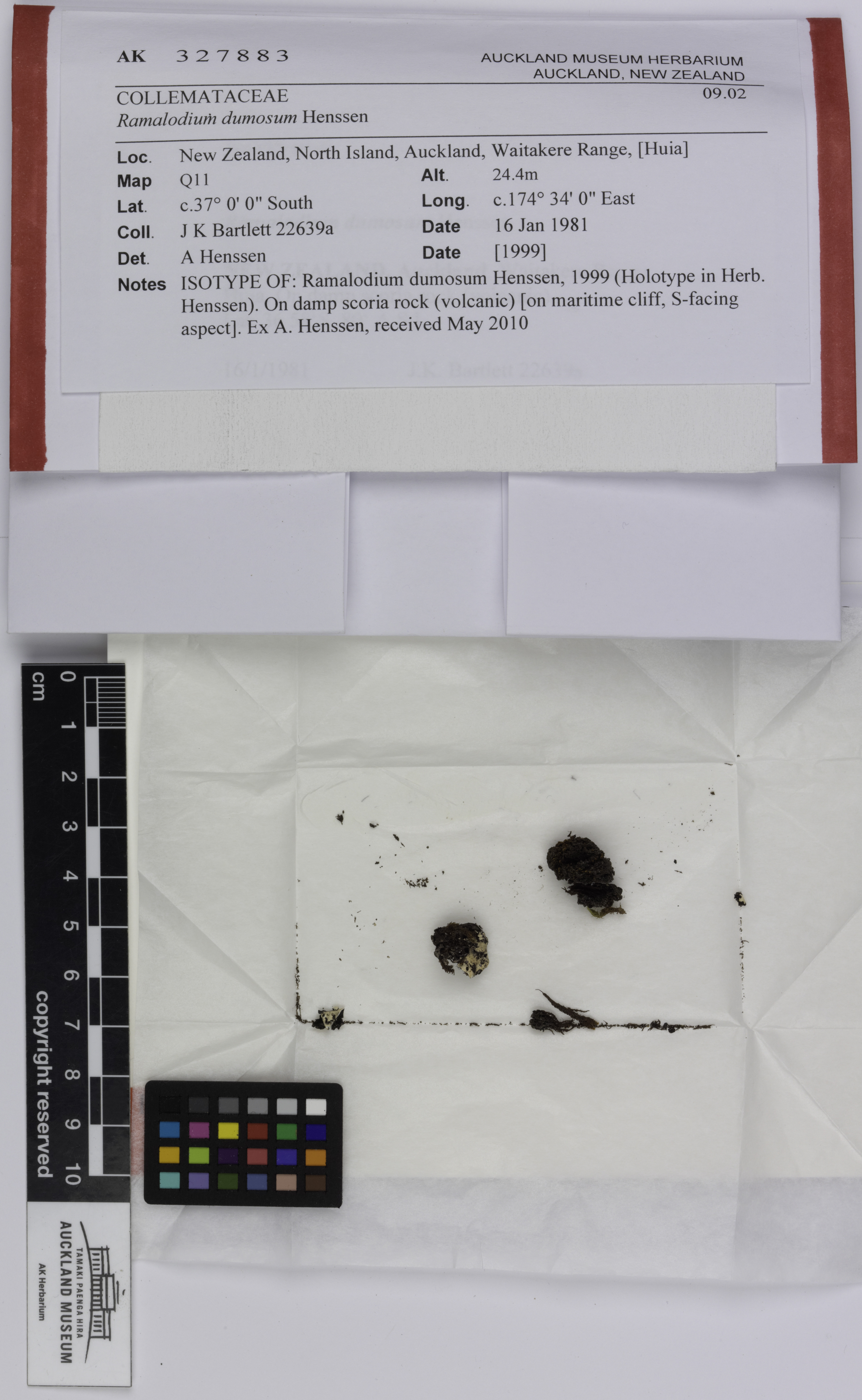
- Ramalodium dumosum

Scientific classification
- Domain: Eukaryota
- Kingdom: Fungi
- Division: Ascomycota
- Class: Lecanoromycetes
- Order: Peltigerales
- Family: Pannariaceae
- Genus: Ramalodium; Nyl.

Type species
- Ramalodium succulentum Nyl.

= Ramalodium =

Genus of fungi

Ramalodium is a lichenized genus of fungi within the Collemataceae family.
