= Psorophorus =

Scientific classification
- Domain: Eukaryota
- Kingdom: Fungi
- Division: Ascomycota
- Class: Lecanoromycetes
- Order: Peltigerales
- Family: Pannariaceae
- Genus: Psorophorus; Elvebakk & S.G.Hong, 2010

Genus of fungi

Psorophorus is a genus of lichenized fungi in the family Pannariaceae. It contains 2 known species.

Psorophorus was described as a new genus in 2010 when it was separated from the closely related genus Psoroma. Psorophorus species differ from other species in the family in being corticolous, having adpressed squamules on a distinct, dark prothallus, lacking melanins, having a thin cortical layer and a simpler apical ascus structure.

== Species ==
- Psorophorus pholidotus (Mont.) Elvebakk & S.G.Hong
- Psorophorus fuegiensis (Zahlbr.) Elvebakk & S.G.Hong
