= Erinacellus =

Scientific classification
- Kingdom: Fungi
- Division: Ascomycota
- Class: Lecanoromycetes
- Order: Peltigerales
- Genus: Erinacellus; T.Sprib., Muggia & Tønsberg (2014)

Type species
- Erinacellus dendroides (Henssen) T.Sprib., Tønsberg & Muggia (2014)

Species
- E. dendroides E. schmidtii

Genus of lichen-forming fungi

Erinacellus is a genus of lichen-forming fungi of uncertain familial placement in the order Peltigerales. It consists of two species. These lichens are characterised by their dense, cushion-like growths composed of erect, thread-like branches, which resemble miniature hedgehogs. The genus was established in 2014 and is named after the hedgehog genus Erinaceus, reflecting its appearance. Erinacellus forms a symbiotic relationship with Hyphomorpha, a type of cyanobacteria. While the genus is placed within the order Peltigerales, its exact position within this group remains uncertain. The two species, E. dendroides and E. schmidtii, are found in different parts of the world, with E. dendroides occurring in New Zealand and North America, and E. schmidtii in Thailand and Sri Lanka. These lichens typically grow in moist environments, such as coastal areas and tropical regions, and can be found on both rocks and tree bark.

== Taxonomy ==
The genus Erinacellus was established in 2014 by the lichenologists Toby Spribille, Lucia Muggia, and Tor Tønsberg. They designated Erinacellus dendroides as the type species, which was previously classified under the genus Spilonema. The genus name Erinacellus is derived from Erinaceus, the scientific name for Eurasian hedgehogs, with the diminutive suffix -ellus. This nomenclature alludes to the dark, cushion-forming thalli characteristic of the genus, which resemble miniature hedgehogs.

Phylogenetically, Erinacellus is placed within the order Peltigerales. However, its exact position within this order remains uncertain. Some analyses have placed it within the suborder Peltigerineae, while others suggest a sister relationship to the family Koerberiaceae, albeit with low statistical support. Due to this ambiguity, Erinacellus is currently considered Peltigerales incertae sedis, indicating its precise taxonomic placement is yet to be definitively determined. The use of its sequence in a later molecular analysis of other Peltigerales taxa also did not resolve its incertae sedis placement.

Despite its former classification, molecular evidence demonstrates that Erinacellus is not closely related to the genus Spilonema. The two genera can be distinguished by several morphological and symbiotic characteristics. Erinacellus exhibits a distinct branching pattern and branch colouration compared to Spilonema. Moreover, Erinacellus forms a symbiotic association with the cyanobacterial genus Hyphomorpha, whereas Spilonema associates with Stigonema. These differences in both fungal morphology and photobiont partner underscore the separation of Erinacellus as a distinct genus within the Peltigerales. Hyphomorpha is a phenotypically defined algal genus classified in either the Fischerellaceae or the Hapalosiphonaceae.

== Description ==
Erinacellus is a genus of lichenised fungi that forms a symbiotic relationship with the cyanobacterial genus Hyphomorpha. The thallus of Erinacellus species is characterised by a dense cushion of erect, thread-like branches, giving it a distinctive appearance. The branches of Erinacellus are differentiated into primary, secondary, and tertiary structures. The primary branches are typically light grey or dark brown, while the secondary and tertiary branches are consistently dark brown. This colour differentiation is particularly noticeable in E. dendroides, where the primary 'trunks' are light-coloured and the outer branches are dark.

The branching pattern in Erinacellus is nearly isotomic dichotomous, especially at the terminal ends of the branches. This means that the branches divide into two roughly equal parts at their tips. The fungal hyphae enclose the photobiont in a continuous sheath, with the sheathing fungal cells being rectangular in shape. However, this sheath does not form a true cellular cortex.

Erinacellus differs from the superficially similar genus Spilonema in its ability to produce secondary and tertiary branching. This results in a more complex, dendroid (tree-like) growth habit in Erinacellus, particularly noticeable in E. dendroides.

As of 2014, mature ascomata (fungal reproductive structures) and pycnidia (asexual reproductive structures) had not been observed in this genus, limiting the morphological characteristics available for study to primarily vegetative features.

== Habitat and distribution ==
Species of Erinacellus have been reported from various locations around the world, indicating a widespread but possibly disjunct distribution. Erinacellus dendroides, the type species of the genus, has been recorded from several regions. It was originally described from Stewart Island, New Zealand. In North America, it has been found in Alaska and British Columbia, Canada. In south-eastern Alaska, E. dendroides is reported to be locally common on shore pines (Pinus contorta) in coastal blanket bogs, locally known as muskegs. Erinacellus schmidtii, the other known species in the genus, has a more restricted distribution. It is considered a palaeotropical species, having been recorded from Thailand and Sri Lanka.

The ecology of Erinacellus species appears to be linked to high-moisture environments. The presence of E. dendroides in blanket bogs and on shore pines in coastal areas suggests an affinity for humid, possibly cool climates. However, the occurrence of E. schmidtii in tropical regions indicates that the genus can also tolerate warmer conditions, provided there is sufficient moisture. The genus seems to be adaptable in terms of substrate, with records of growth on both rock (as noted for the original Spilonema dendroides specimen from New Zealand) and tree bark (as observed in Alaska). This suggests that Erinacellus species may be able to colonise various surfaces in suitable climatic conditions.
