= Physma =

Scientific classification
- Domain: Eukaryota
- Kingdom: Fungi
- Division: Ascomycota
- Class: Lecanoromycetes
- Order: Peltigerales
- Family: Pannariaceae
- Genus: Physma; A.Massal. (1854)

Type species
- Physma boryanum (Pers.) A.Massal. (1854)

Species
- P. ahtianum P. boryanum P. byrsaeum P. chilense P. pseudoisidiatum

Genus of lichens

Physma is a genus of cyanolichens in the family Pannariaceae. It has five species. The genus was circumscribed by Italian lichenologist Abramo Bartolommeo Massalongo in 1854, with Physma boryanum assigned as the type species.

== Species ==
- Physma ahtianum Verdon & Elix (1994)
- Physma boryanum (Pers.) A.Massal. (1854)
- Physma byrsaeum (Afzel. ex Ach.) Tuck. (1882)
- Physma chilense Hue (1906)
- Physma pseudoisidiatum Aptroot & Sipman (1991)
