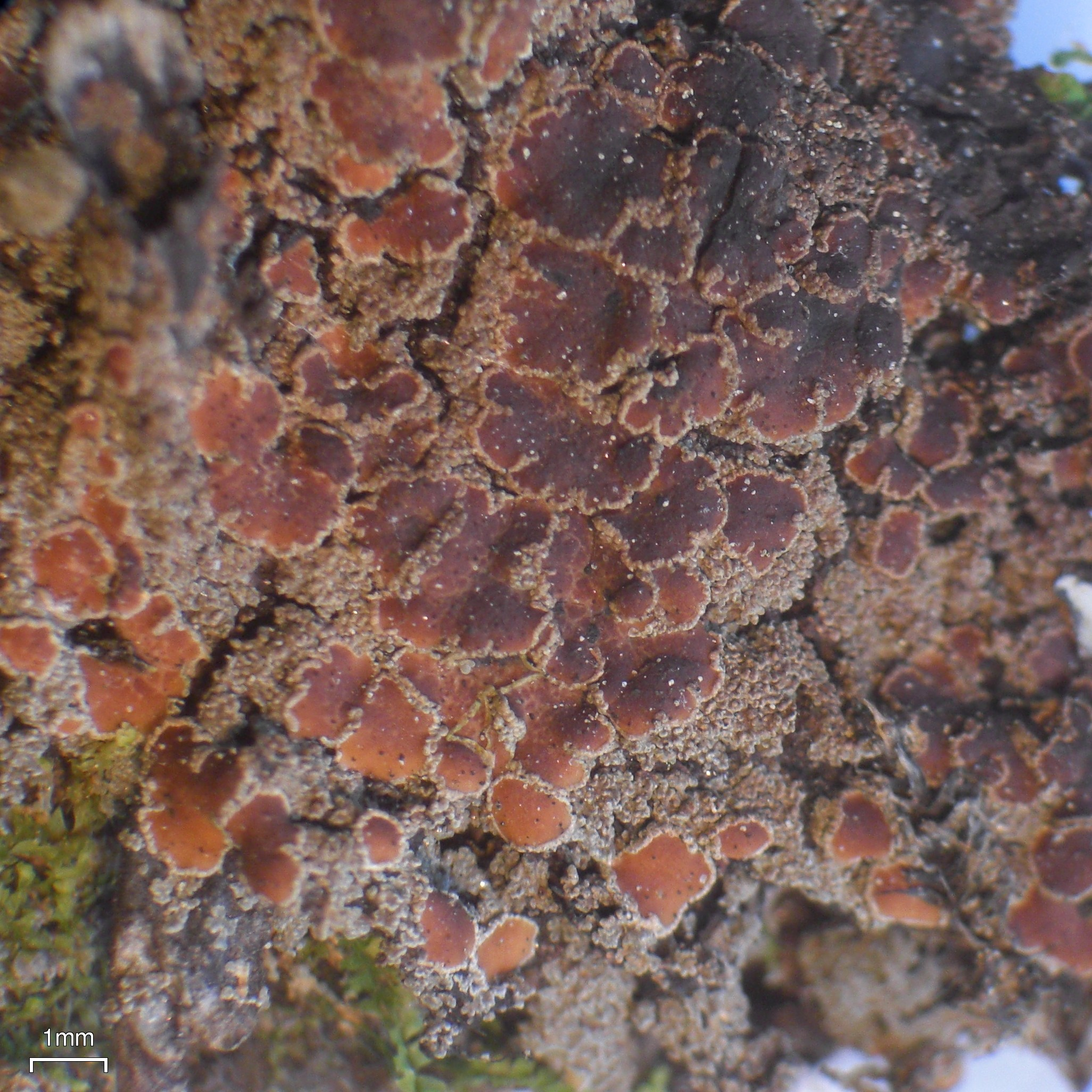
- Protopannaria pezizoides

Scientific classification
- Kingdom: Fungi
- Division: Ascomycota
- Class: Lecanoromycetes
- Order: Peltigerales
- Family: Pannariaceae
- Genus: Protopannaria (Gyeln.) P.M.Jørg. & S.Ekman (2000)

Type species
- Protopannaria pezizoides (Weber ex F.H.Wigg.) P.M.Jørg. & S.Ekman (2000)

Species
- P. alcicornis P. austro-orcadensis P. azorellae P. campbellensis P. corticola P. hilaris P. pezizoides

Synonyms
- Pannaria subgen. Protopannaria Gyeln.

= Protopannaria =

Genus of lichens

Protopannaria is a genus of seven species of lichen-forming fungi in the family Pannariaceae. The genus was elevated from a subgenus of Pannaria to full genus status in 2000. Protopannaria lichens typically grow as small, overlapping patches on mossy tree trunks and branches in humid, old-growth forests. The genus is primarily distributed in subantarctic and temperate regions of the Southern Hemisphere.

== Taxonomy ==
The genus was originally circumscribed as a subgenus of the genus Pannaria by the Hungarian lichenologist Vilmos Kőfaragó-Gyelnik. Per Magnus Jørgensen and Stefan Ekman promoted Protopannaria to full status as a genus in 2000.

== Description ==
Protopannaria species form a small, often overlapping mosaic of scales that ranges from crust-like patches to more distinct squamules. These units are usually anchored by a blue to blue-black fibrous layer (hypothallus) that can be visible at the margins. The upper surface varies from greyish blue to deep brown-black and lacks a differentiated cortex. The fungal hyphae weave among the cells of a blue-green cyanobacterial partner (Nostoc), creating a loose to pseudoparenchymatous texture beneath the surface.

The sessile fruiting bodies (apothecia) bear red-brown to nearly black discs and retain a persistent rim of thallus tissue (a thalline margin). This margin is two-layered: its outer zone consists of tightly packed pseudoparenchymatous cells, while the inner zone is looser and densely infused with photobiont cells. A pale, thin true exciple surrounds the hymenium. When treated with iodine, the hymenium stains blackish blue (I+). Each asci produces eight ascospores and belongs to the Pannaria structural type, lacking any amyloid apical apparatus. The spores are colourless, single-celled and ellipsoidal, often ending in one or two pointed tips and carrying a finely warted outer layer. Asexual reproduction occurs in immersed pycnidia that release straight, rod-shaped conidia. No secondary metabolites (lichen substances) have been detected in the genus by thin-layer chromatography.

== Ecology ==
Species of Protopannaria usually carpet mats of bryophytes that grow on the trunks and branches of damp, broad-leaved trees, especially in lichen-rich Lobarion communities—humid, old-growth woodland communities dominated by large, foliose cyanobacterial lichens such as Lobaria, Pseudocyphellaria, and related genera. Less often the lichens extend onto nearby rocks where conditions remain persistently cool and wet.

== Species ==
As of July 2025, Species Fungorum (in the Catalogue of Life) accept seven species of Protopannaria:

- Protopannaria alcicornis P.M.Jørg. & R.S.Poulsen (2001)
- Protopannaria austro-orcadensis (Øvstedal) P.M.Jørg. (2001)
- Protopannaria azorellae P.M.Jørg. & R.S.Poulsen (2001)
- Protopannaria campbellensis Øvstedal & Fryday (2011)
- Protopannaria corticola P.M.Jørg. (2007)
- Protopannaria hilaris (Zahlbr.) P.M.Jørg. (2004)
- Protopannaria pezizoides (Weber) P.M.Jørg. & S.Ekman (2000)
