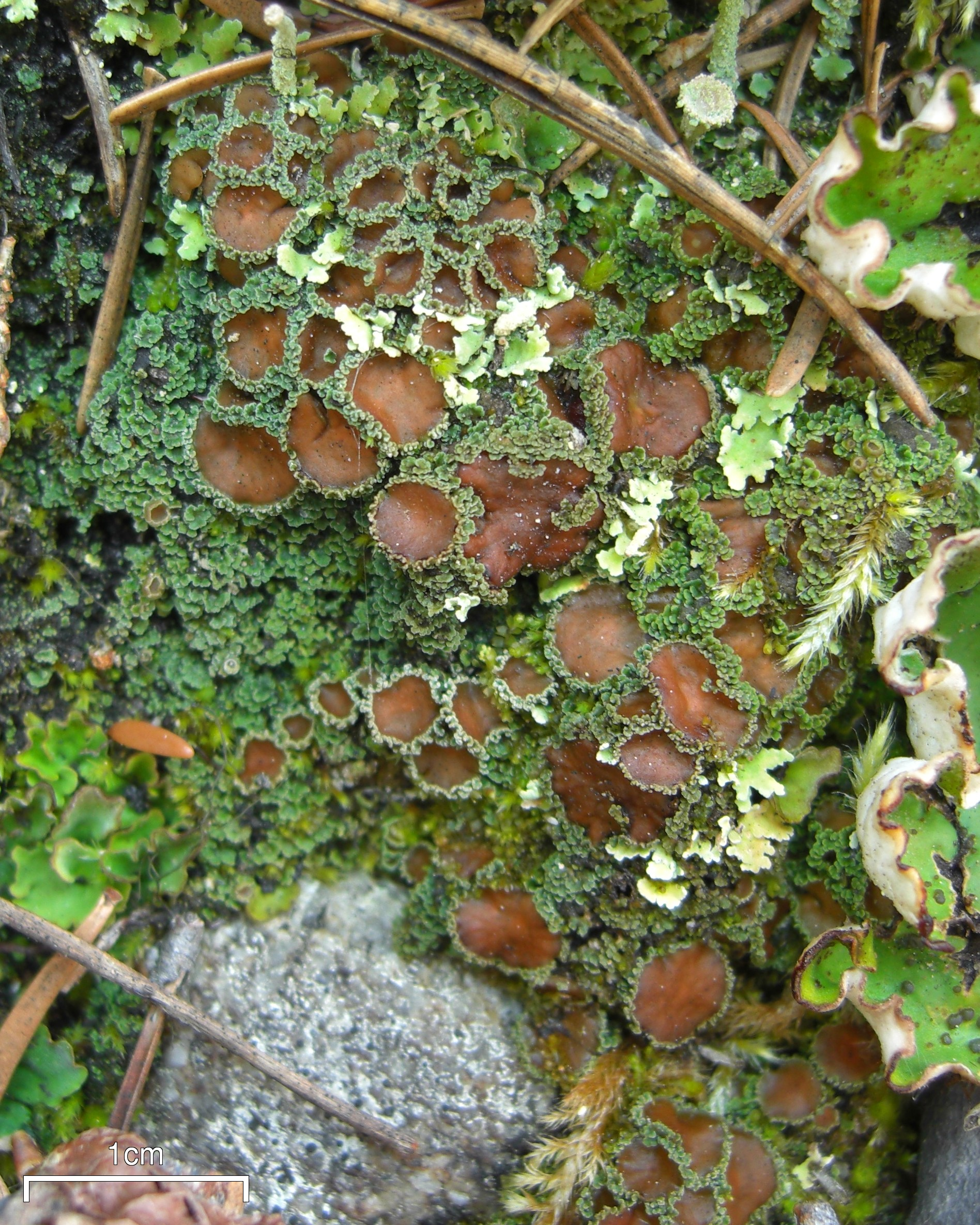
- Psoroma hypnorum

Scientific classification
- Domain: Eukaryota
- Kingdom: Fungi
- Division: Ascomycota
- Class: Lecanoromycetes
- Order: Peltigerales
- Family: Pannariaceae
- Genus: Psoroma; Ach. ex Michx. (1803)

Type species
- Psoroma hypnorum (Vahl) Gray (1821)

Synonyms
- Phloeopannaria Zahlbr. (1941); Psoromatomyces Cif. & Tomas. (1953)

= Psoroma =

Genus of lichen-forming fungi

Psoroma is a genus of lichen-forming fungi in the family Pannariaceae. The widespread genus contains about 30 species, most of which are found in south temperate regions.

== Taxonomy ==
The genus was circumscribed by the French botanist André Michaux in 1803.

Some species formerly in Psoroma were transferred to the new genera Psorophorus and Xanthopsoroma in 2010. The genus Joergensenia was erected in 2008 to contain the species formerly known as Psoroma cephalodinum.

== Description ==
The genus Psoroma is characterised by its small scale-like thallus, with an underlying layer that is barely noticeable. It houses a green algal photobiont, possibly the algae Myrmecia, which collaborates with the fungus to perform photosynthesis. Psoroma species have cephalodia, structures containing the cyanobacterium Nostoc.

The reproductive organs, known as ascomata, are apothecial in form—essentially sessile and somewhat cup-shaped with a raised, enduring edge. Within these structures, the supporting filaments, or paraphyses, may be simple or branch towards their tips, which do not expand or form a cap, staining a dusky blue when iodine is applied. The spore-producing asci are elongated, either club-shaped or cylindrical, featuring a distinctive structure at their tips where a central tube stains blue with iodine within a lighter-staining area, surrounded by a clear amyloid ring.

Spores produced by Psoroma are single-celled, colourless, and often contain one or two large oil droplets. Their shape is ellipsoidal, with a surface that is warty or ridged, and somewhat pointed at the ends. For asexual reproduction, Psoroma develops pycnidia, which are pale brown, and produces simple, rod-shaped, colourless conidia.

Chemically, Psoroma usually lacks detectable secondary metabolites (lichen products) through thin-layer chromatography, although in rare cases, porphyrilic acid and related compounds may be present.

== Species ==
As of March 2024, Species Fungorum (in the Catalogue of Life) accepts 28 species of Psoroma.

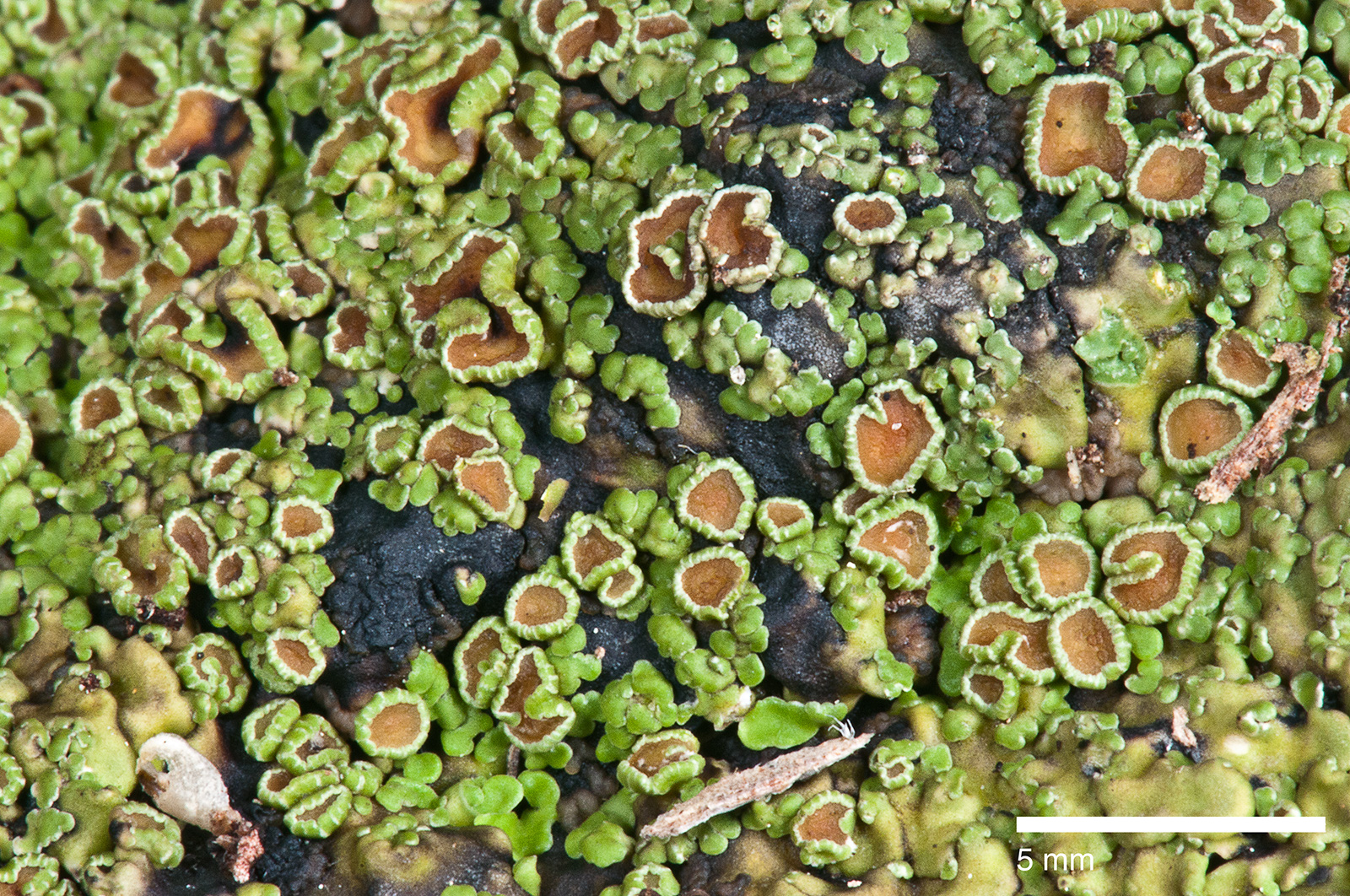
Psoroma sphinctrinum

- Psoroma absconditum Øvstedal (2008)
- Psoroma antarcticum S.G.Hong & Elvebakk (2018) – Antarctica
- Psoroma asperellum Nyl. (1869)
- Psoroma caliginosum Stirt. (1877)
- Psoroma capense Elvebakk, S.G.Hong & Rämä (2020) – South Africa
- Psoroma cinnamomeum Malme (1925)
- Psoroma cyanosorediatum P.M.Jørg. (2004)
- Psoroma dichroum (Hook.f. & Taylor) P.M.Jørg. (2014)
- Psoroma echinaceum P.M.Jørg. & Wedin (1999)
- Psoroma esterhuyseniae Elvebakk (2020) – South Africa
- Psoroma filicicola P.M.Jørg. & Sipman (2006)
- Psoroma fruticulosum P.James & Henssen (1983)
- Psoroma geminatum P.M.Jørg. (1999)
- Psoroma hirsutulum Nyl. ex Cromb. (1875)
- Psoroma hypnorum (Vahl) Gray (1821)
- Psoroma inflatum Elvebakk (2021) – New Zealand
- Psoroma macquariense C.W.Dodge (1970) – Antarctica
- Psoroma macrosporum (P.M.Jørg. & Palice) P.M.Jørg. (2014)
- Psoroma multifidum P.M.Jørg. (2004)
- Psoroma nigropunctatum Elvebakk & Elix (2021) – Australia
- Psoroma nivale Fryday, Elvebakk, F.L.Anderson & J.Gagnon (2019) – Quebec, Canada
- Psoroma obscurius (Nyl.) P.M.Jørg. (2014)
- Psoroma orphninum (Hue) P.M.Jørg. (2014)
- Psoroma paleaceum (Fr.) Nyl. (1855)
- Psoroma pholidotoides (Nyl.) Trevis. (1869)
- Psoroma polychidioides (Zahlbr.) P.M.Jørg. (2014)
- Psoroma saccharatum Scutari & Calvelo (1995) – Argentina
- Psoroma sphinctrinum (Mont.) Nyl. (1855)
- Psoroma xanthorioides (P.M.Jørg.) P.M.Jørg. (2014)
- Psoromaria rosulata (P.M.Jørg. & D.J.Galloway) P.M.Jørg. & H.L.Andersen (2015)
- Psoromaria versicolor (Müll.Arg.) P.M.Jørg. & H.L.Andersen (2015)
