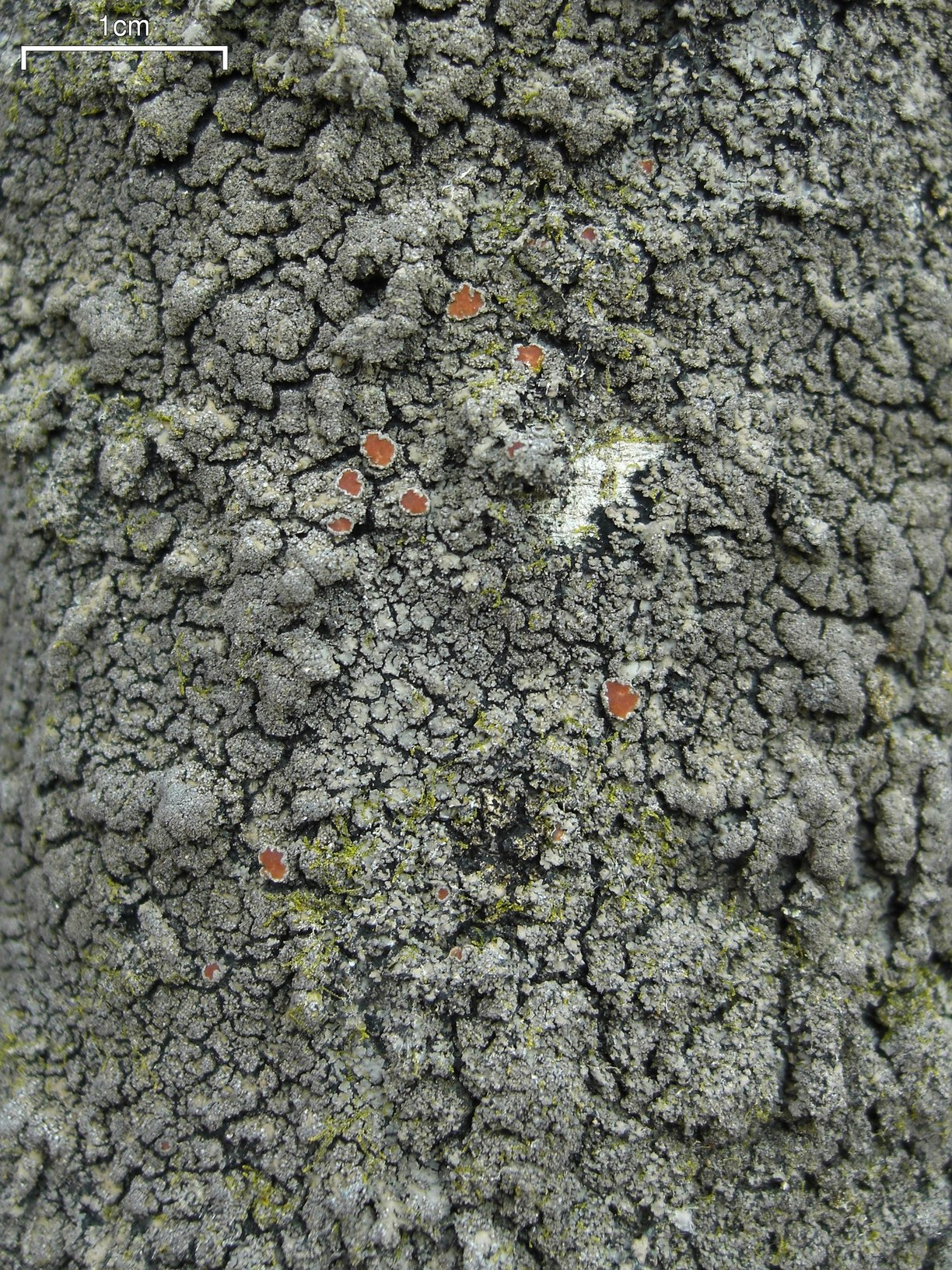
- Parmeliella triptophylla

Scientific classification
- Kingdom: Fungi
- Division: Ascomycota
- Class: Lecanoromycetes
- Order: Peltigerales
- Family: Pannariaceae
- Genus: Parmeliella; Müll.Arg. (1862)

Type species
- Parmeliella triptophylla (Ach.) Müll.Arg. (1862)

= Parmeliella =

Genus of lichen-forming fungi

Parmeliella is a genus of lichen-forming fungi in the family Pannariaceae. It occurs mainly in the tropics and subtropics, with species found in Africa, Asia, Australasia and South America. These lichens form small, leaf-like or crusty patches that are often anchored by blue-black fibres, and they partner with nitrogen-fixing cyanobacteria. The genus was established in 1862 by the Swiss lichenologist Johannes Müller Argoviensis, who distinguished it from related genera by the structure of its fruiting bodies.

== Taxonomy ==
The genus was circumscribed by the Swiss lichenologist Johannes Müller Argoviensis in 1862. In his original description, Müller Argoviensis distinguished Parmeliella from the genus Pannaria primarily by the structure of the fruiting bodies (apothecia). He noted that Parmeliella species have apothecia with a proper margin that lacks photobiont cells (gonidia) from the beginning and becomes somewhat sunken into the thallus as it ages, contrasting with the swollen, photobiont-rich margins typical of Pannaria. The spores were described as hyaline (colourless) and simple in structure. Müller Argoviensis initially included two species in the genus: P. triptophylla and P. turgida, both found in the high forests of the Dôle region near Geneva, particularly on Sorbus aucuparia (rowan trees) and less commonly on beech and fir trunks.

== Description ==
Parmeliella produces a thallus that may be leaf-like (foliose), composed of minute overlapping scales (squamulose, or form a thin crust (crustose). Whatever the growth form, the thallus is often anchored by a blue to blue-black felt of hyphae (the hypothallus) that can show at the margins. The upper surface ranges from grey-blue to almost black and may carry powdery soredia, cylindrical isidia, or leaf-like phyllidia, which all serve as propagules for vegetative reproduction. On the thallus underside the texture varies: some species bear a fine woolly covering (tomentum), whereas others develop sparse root-like rhizines, and the tissue is usually pale. The photobiont is a filamentous cyanobacterium of the genus Nostoc, giving the lichen its ability to fix atmospheric nitrogen.

Sexual reproduction takes place in sessile fruiting bodies (apothecia), most of which are biatorine in form—that is, they lack a rim of thallus tissue and instead show a red-brown to black disc bordered only by the exciple. This true exciple is thick and pseudoparenchymatous, the cells rounded to oblong and roughly 15–20 micrometres across. Threads of unbranched paraphyses weave through the hymenium; their tips are barely swollen, and their external pigment stains blue in iodine solution (I+). Each ascus contains eight ascospores and displays a deeply blue-staining ring when treated with potassium iodide, a feature diagnostic of the Pannaria type. The spores are colourless, single-celled and ellipsoidal, often terminating in one or two pointed tips, and their outer wall is minutely warted or ridged. asexual propagules are produced only rarely in minute pycnidia and appear as straight, rod-shaped conidia. Thin-layer chromatography rarely detects secondary metabolites in the genus, although fresh thalli of some species release an antiseptic odour when moistened, and some members can contain pannarin, which results in PD+ (orange-red) spot test reaction.

== Species ==
As of July 2025, Species Fungorum (in the Catalogue of Life) accepts 42 species of Parmeliella.

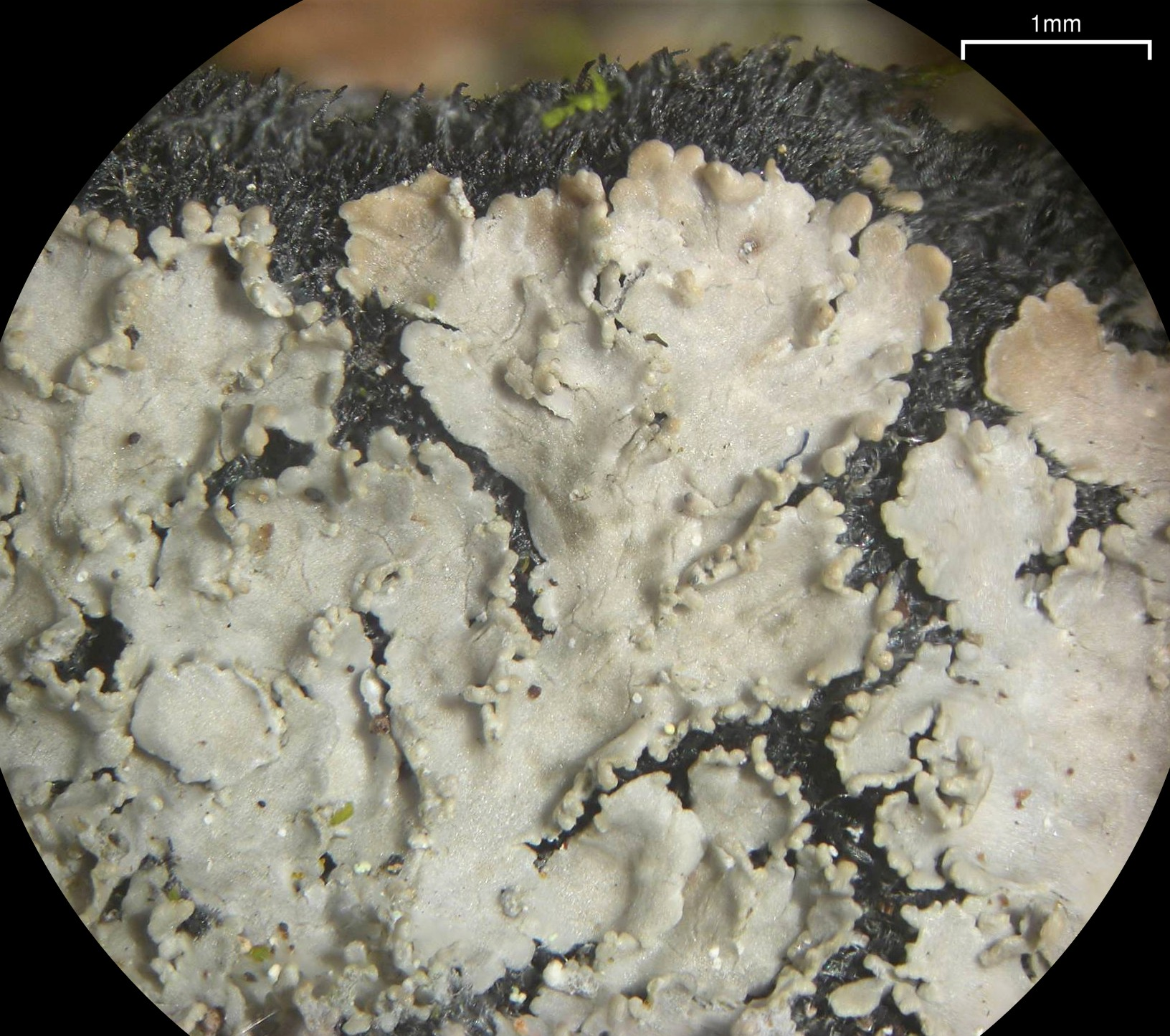
Parmeliella appalachensis

- Parmeliella aggregata P.M.Jørg. & D.J.Galloway (1999) – New Zealand
- Parmeliella alniphila P.M.Jørg. (2001)
- Parmeliella angustiloba P.M.Jørg. & Arv. (2004) – Ecuador
- Parmeliella appalachensis P.M.Jørg. (2000)
- Parmeliella asahinae (Räsänen) P.M.Jørg. (2001)
- Parmeliella clavulifera P.M.Jørg. (2000) – Mexico
- Parmeliella coerulescens Müll.Arg. (1893)
- Parmeliella conopleioides P.M.Jørg. (2001) – Brazil; Venezuela; Costa Rica
- Parmeliella corallina P.M.Jørg. & Palice (2010)
- Parmeliella dactylifera P.M.Jørg. (2003) – South Africa
- Parmeliella delicata P.M.Jørg. & Arv. (2004) – Ecuador
- Parmeliella diffracta Müll.Arg. (1893)
- Parmeliella expansa P.M.Jørg. & Arv. (2004) – Ecuador
- Parmeliella flavida P.M.Jørg. (2003)
- Parmeliella foliicola Aptroot & P.M.Jørg. (2006)
- Parmeliella furfuracea P.M.Jørg. (2001) – Australia
- Parmeliella granulata I.M.Lamb (1955)
- Parmeliella gymnocheila (Nyl.) Müll.Arg. (1894)
- Parmeliella himalayana Upreti & Divakar (2005) – India
- Parmeliella isidiopannosa P.M.Jørg. (2003)
- Parmeliella laceroides P.M.Jørg. & Sipman (2006)
- Parmeliella ligulata P.M.Jørg. & D.J.Galloway (1992) – Australia
- Parmeliella magellanica P.M.Jørg. (2004)
- Parmeliella nigrata (Müll.Arg.) P.M.Jørg. & D.J.Galloway (1992)
- Parmeliella nigrocincta (Mont.) Müll.Arg. (1881)
- Parmeliella palmatula P.M.Jørg. (2001) – Australia
- Parmeliella paramensis P.M.Jørg. & Arv. (2004) – Ecuador
- Parmeliella parvula P.M.Jørg. (1977)
- Parmeliella philippina (Vain.) P.M.Jørg. (2005)
- Parmeliella piundensis P.M.Jørg. & Sipman (2006)
- Parmeliella plumosella P.M.Jørg. (2007)
- Parmeliella polydactyla P.M.Jørg. & Coppins (2007)
- Parmeliella saxicola P.M.Jørg. (2000)
- Parmeliella serpentinicola P.M.Jørg. & Kashiw. (2001)
- Parmeliella subfuscata A.Dube & Makhija (2008) – India
- Parmeliella subtilis P.M.Jørg. & P.James (1999) – New Zealand
- Parmeliella testacea P.M.Jørg. (1978)
- Parmeliella triptophylla (Ach.) Müll.Arg. (1862)
- Parmeliella thysanota (Stirt.) Zahlbr. (1925)
- Parmeliella triptophylloides P.M.Jørg. (2003) – Kenya
- Parmeliella verruculosa P.M.Jørg. (2001)
