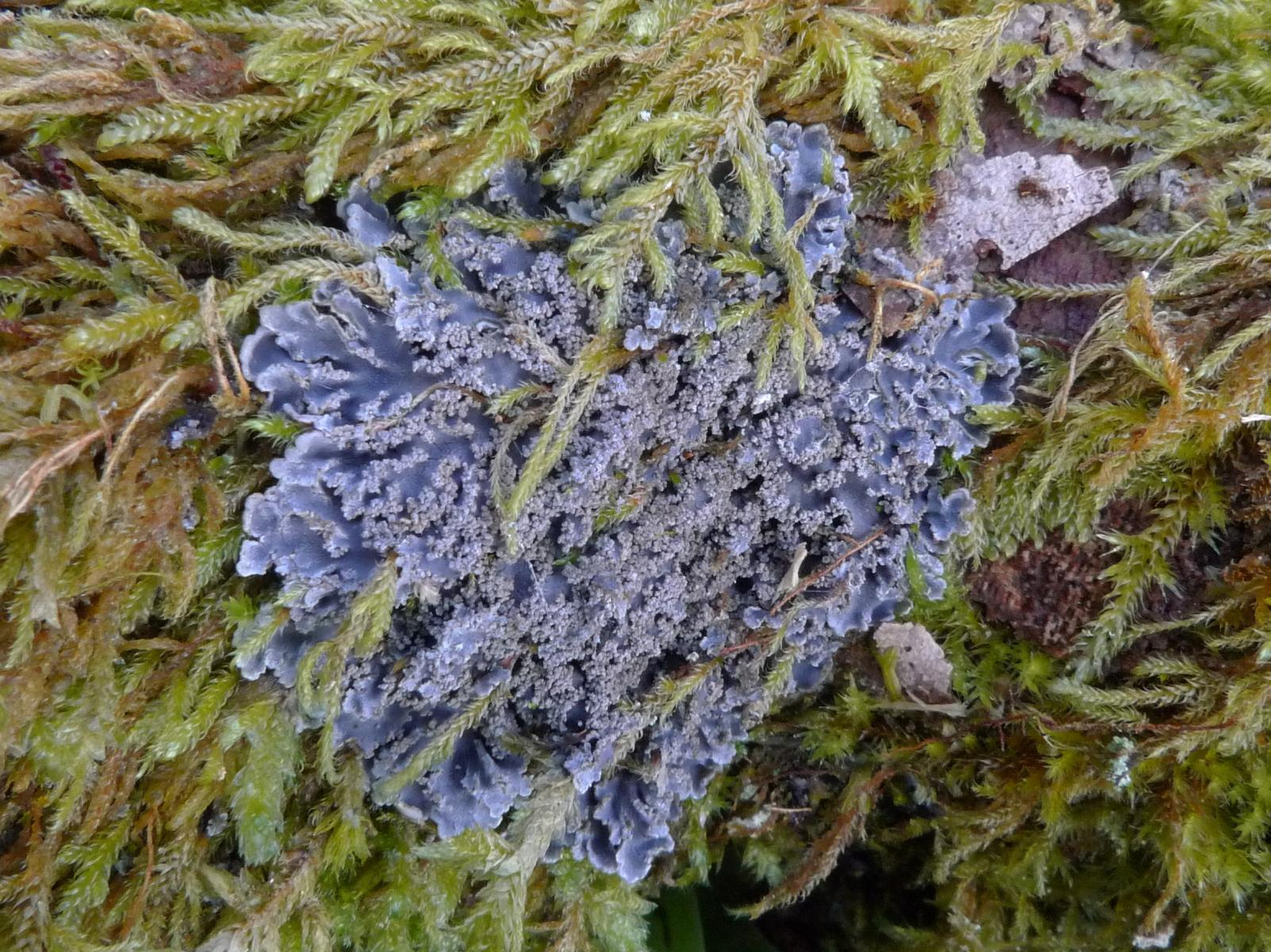
- Pannaria conoplea, in Pont-Neuf, France

Scientific classification
- Kingdom: Fungi
- Division: Ascomycota
- Class: Lecanoromycetes
- Order: Peltigerales
- Family: Pannariaceae; Tuck. (1872)

Type genus
- Pannaria Delise ex Bory (1828)

= Pannariaceae =

Family of fungi

The Pannariaceae are a family of lichens in the order Peltigerales (suborder Collematineae). Species from this family have a widespread distribution, but are especially prevalent in southern temperate regions.

== Genera ==
According to a 2020 estimate, the family contains 27 genera and about 360 species. The following list indicates the genus name, the taxonomic authority, year of publication, and the number of species:

- Atrophysma T.Sprib. (2020) – 1 sp.
- Austrella P.M.Jørg. (2004) – 3 spp.
- Austroparmeliella (P.M.Jørg.) P.M.Jørg. (2014) – 5 spp.
- Degelia Arv. & D.J.Galloway (1981) – 16 spp.
- Erioderma Feé (1825) – 32 spp.
- Fuscoderma (D.J.Galloway & P.M.Jørg.) P.M.Jørg. & D.J.Galloway (1989) – 5 spp.
- Fuscopannaria P.M.Jørg. (1994) – 58 spp.
- Kroswia P.M.Jørg. (2002) – 4 spp.
- Gibbosporina Elvebakk, S.G.Hong & P.M.Jørg. (2016) – 13 spp.
- Hispidopannaria Elvebakk, S.G.Hong & C.H.Park (2020) – 2 spp.
- Homothecium A.Massal. (1853) – 4 spp.
- Joergensenia Passo, S.Stenroos & Calvelo (2008) – 1 sp.
- Kroswia P.M.Jørg. (2002) – 4 spp.
- Leciophysma Th.Fr. (1865) – 2 spp.
- Leightoniella Henssen (1965) – 1 sp.
- Leioderma Nyl. (1888) – 7 spp.
- Lepidocollema Vain. (1890) – 22 spp.
- Leptogidium Nyl. (1873) – 3 spp.
- Nebularia P.M.Jørg. (2014) – 2 spp.
- Nevesia P.M.Jørg, L.Lindblom, Wedin & S.Ekman (2014) – 1 sp.
- Pannaria Del. ex Bory (1828) – ca. 40 spp.
- Parmeliella Müll.Arg. (1862) – ca. 40 spp.
- Pectenia P.M.Jørg. (2014) – 4 spp.
- Phormopsora Elvebakk, S.G.Hong & C.H.Park (2020) – 1 sp.
- Physma A.Massal. (1864) – 12 spp.
- Protopannaria (Gyeln.) P.M.Jørg. & S.Ekman (2000) – 7 spp.
- Psoroma Michaux (1803) – ca. 70 spp.
- Psoromidium Stirt. (1877) – 2 spp.
- Psorophorus Elvebakk & S.G.Hong (2010) – 2 spp.
- Ramalodium Nyl. (1879) – 6 spp.
- Rockefellera Lendemer & E.Tripp (2017) – 1 sp.
- Siphulastrum Müll.Arg. (1889) – 4 spp.
- Staurolemma Körb. (1867) – 3 spp.
- Steineropsis T.Sprib. & Muggia (2010) – 1 sp.
- Xanthopsoroma Elvebakk & S.G.Hong (2010) – 2 spp.
