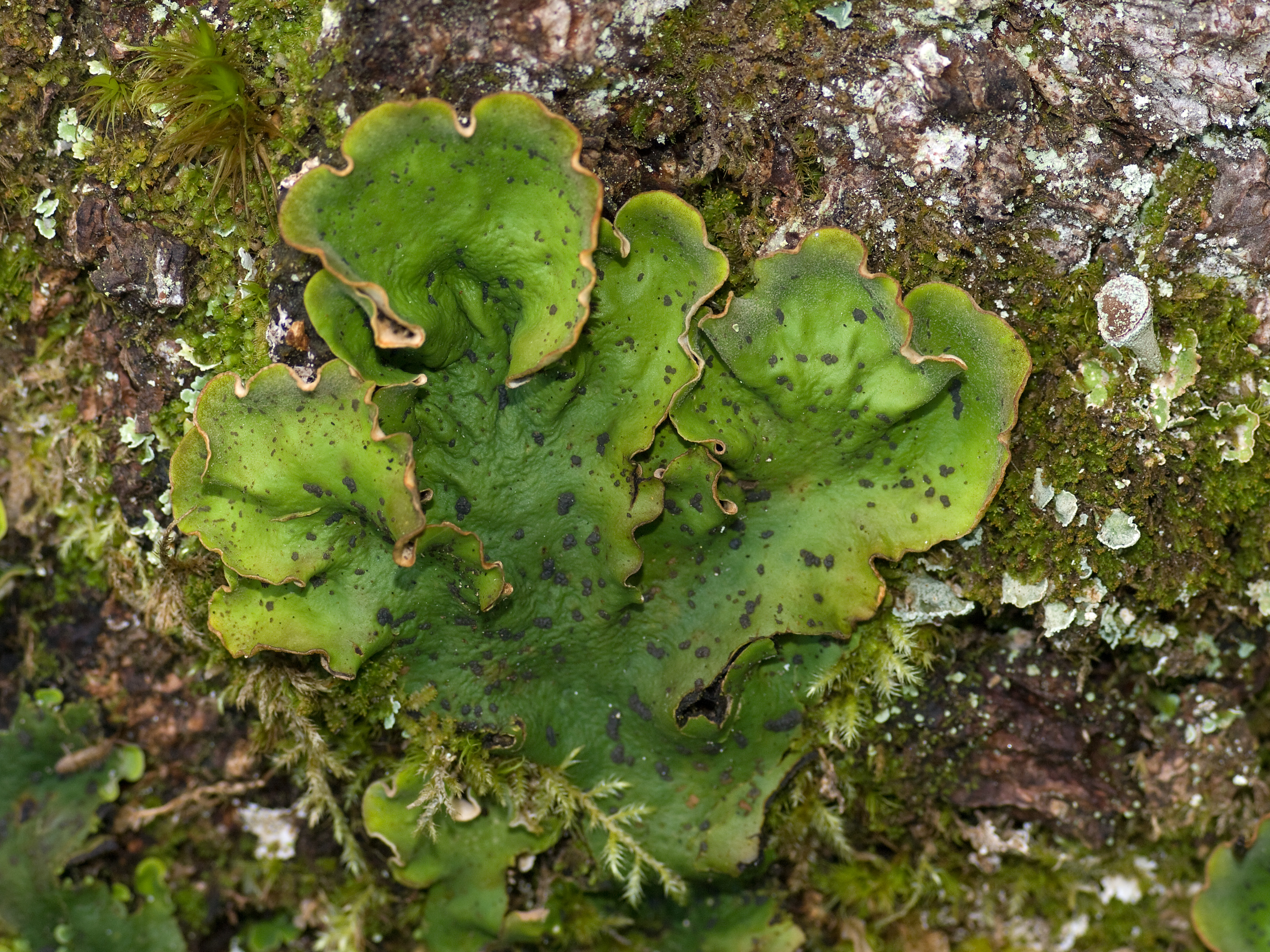
- Peltigera aphthosa

Scientific classification
- Kingdom: Fungi
- Division: Ascomycota
- Class: Lecanoromycetes
- Subclass: Lecanoromycetidae
- Order: Peltigerales; Walt.Watson (1929)

Suborders and families
- Suborder Collematineae: Coccocarpiaceae; Collemataceae; Pannariaceae; Placynthiaceae; Vahliellaceae; Suborder Peltigerineae: Koerberiaceae; Peltigeraceae; Massalongiaceae

= Peltigerales =

Order of lichen-forming fungi

Peltigerales is an order of lichen-forming fungi belonging to the class Lecanoromycetes in the division Ascomycota. The taxonomy of the group has seen numerous changes; it was formerly often treated as a suborder of the order Lecanorales. It contains two suborders, eight families and about 45 genera such as Lobaria and Peltigera.

The fungi form lichens in a symbiotic relationship with one or two photosynthetic partners which may be a cyanobacterium such as Nostoc or a green alga such as Coccomyxa. The majority of species contain just a cyanobacterium, a smaller number have both a cyanobacterium and a green alga while only a few species have just a green alga. The thallus of the lichen may be foliose (leafy), subfruticose (somewhat shrubby) or granular-squamulose (scaly). The thallus attaches to a surface by means of small root-like rhizines. In some species, the thallus may vary in appearance depending on whether it contains a cyanobacterium or a green alga. Sometimes these different morphs of a single fungus were formerly thought to be separate species.

The lichens occur worldwide, having a cosmopolitan distribution. While growing on bark, moss, soil or rocks in humid woodland. The greatest diversity occurs in the Northern Hemisphere although the family Peltigeraceae is most diverse in the Southern Hemisphere.

Peltigera canina (dog lichen) - so named due to the white fruiting bodies resembling the teeth of a dog.

Members of the suborder Peltigerineae produce a wide range of secondary compounds, some of which are useful to humans in medicine and dyeing. Former uses include Lobaria pulmonaria (tree lungwort) as a remedy for lung diseases because of its supposed resemblance to lung tissue.

Aberratus and Erinacellus are two small genera of uncertain familial placement in the Peltigerales.

== Other sources ==
- Gilbert, Oliver (2000) Lichens, HarperCollins, London.
