= Gabura insignis =

Scientific classification
- Kingdom: Fungi
- Division: Ascomycota
- Class: Lecanoromycetes
- Order: Baeomycetales
- Family: Arctomiaceae
- Genus: Gabura
- Species: G. insignis

Binomial name
- Gabura insignis (P.M.Jørg. & Tønsberg) Magain & Sérus. (2020)

Synonyms
- Leptogium insigne P.M.Jørg. & Tønsberg (2010); Arctomia insignis (P.M.Jørg. & Tønsberg) Ertz (2017)

Species of lichen-forming fungus

Gabura insignis is a small bark-dwelling lichen in the family Arctomiaceae. It was first described in 2010 from the Pacific Northwest of North America, and was moved to the genus Gabura in 2020 after DNA-based studies (molecular phylogenetics) showed it to be closely related to Gabura fascicularis. Unlike its close relative, which produces disc-like fruiting bodies, G. insignis reproduces asexually by releasing powdery particles called soredia (asexual propagules), and sexual fruiting bodies have not been reported, at least in the Pacific Northwest. It is most common in the Pacific Northwest, from Alaska to California, but it also has widely separated (disjunct) records in Ireland and Scotland, and has been reported from Ecuador and Japan. Closely related evolutionary lines (lineages) occur on islands in the south-western Indian Ocean, and much of the group's genetic diversity is concentrated there. G. insignis typically grows on woody substrates (bark and twigs) in humid, low-elevation environments with oceanic climate conditions, but in Europe it has been found only as tiny, scarce patches, which may help explain why it is often missed in surveys.

== Taxonomy ==
The name Gabura insignis was created for a species first described as Leptogium insigne from the Pacific Northwest of North America, and later transferred to Arctomia as A. insignis. Using a family-level evolutionary tree (a phylogeny) built from DNA sequences at four genetic loci, Magain and colleagues found that this lichen does not belong in Arctomia in the strict sense (sensu stricto). Instead, it falls in a well-supported branch (a clade) with Gabura fascicularis. On that basis, they transferred A. insignis to Gabura as G. insignis. They also moved A. borbonica to G. borbonica, and limited Arctomia sensu stricto to A. delicatula and A. teretiuscula. The authors also corrected the type locality (the location where the type specimen was collected) for the species: the type of L. insigne comes from Lane County, Oregon (it had been misreported as "Washington"), and they documented the first confirmed records of the species for Europe (Scotland and Ireland).

Within Arctomiaceae, G. insignis is the closest known relative (a sister group) of G. fascicularis. Despite that relationship, the two differ in appearance and mode of reproduction: G. fascicularis typically bears abundant apothecia (sexual, disc-like fruiting bodies) with thick thalline rims, whereas G. insignis and close relatives are soredia-producing (sorediate): they form powdery patches (soralia) that release asexual propagules. Because DNA results place the soredia-producing species next to G. fascicularis, the genus Gabura was defined more broadly (its circumscription was expanded) instead of creating a new genus for them.

In current use, the name G. insignis covers several closely related genetic lineages rather than a single clearly separated unit. Magain and colleagues recovered four well-supported groups: (1) G. insignis s.str. (Oregon, Scotland, Ireland), (2) G. borbonica (type from Réunion), and two early-diverging lineages from Madagascar/Réunion and from Réunion/South Africa. Formal DNA-based species-delimitation analyses (for example, GMYC and PTP methods) did not agree with each other, so the authors advised caution and called for more sampling before changing the taxonomy further. Overall, the clade shows an unexpectedly wide geographic range, with much of its genetic diversity centred in the south-western Indian Ocean islands.

== Description ==
Gabura insignis has a gelatinous, foliose thallus (leaf-like lichen body) that is usually small to medium-sized, reaching about 5 cm across. When dry it forms dark, compact thalli that can look strongly wrinkled and compact, but when moistened it expands and becomes more obviously lobed. The lobes are typically 2–6 mm wide, and the thallus is greyish black to brown-black when dry but turns olive-brown when wet. The upper surface is strongly wrinkled, with ridges that are often rough-textured and may bear coarse, irregular, wart-like outgrowths (isidia), granules, or powdery soredia.

No apothecia (sexual fruiting bodies) have been reported for this species in the Pacific Northwest, and it is instead recognized by its asexual propagules and overall thallus form. Internally, the thallus consists of loosely interwoven fungal threads (hyphae). Standard chemical spot tests are negative.

== Habitat and distribution ==
Most records of Gabura insignis are from the Pacific Northwest of North America, with confirmed records from Alaska, British Columbia, California, Oregon and Washington. In the Pacific Northwest it is mainly a coastal species, reported from south-east Alaska to southern Oregon. Magain and colleagues documented the first verified European occurrences (Ireland and Scotland), and noted that earlier accounts may have missed it because it was long confused with the unrelated Leptogium brebissonii, and only later recognised as a distinct species. Their DNA-based phylogeny groups the European specimens with North American G. insignis (sensu stricto, in the strict sense). They also detected related, early-diverging lineages in Madagascar, Réunion and South Africa, and labelled those as Gabura cf. insignis (meaning "compare with insignis") pending further study. Overall, most of the clade's genetic diversity is in the south-western Indian Ocean, while G. insignis in the strict sense is known from North America and the British Isles. It has also been recorded from Ecuador (2016) and Japan (2022).

The species is epiphytic (growing on plants rather than on soil or rock) and forms low, inconspicuous patches. In the Pacific Northwest it grows on twigs of conifers, hardwoods, and shrubs, and has been recorded from coastal forests as well as stabilised dunes and headlands. The type specimen (the reference specimen for the name) was collected near sea level (about 10 m elevation) from a leaning alder (Alnus) trunk in coastal forest in Lane County, Oregon. In the British Isles it has been collected on trees in parkland settings (Killarney, Ireland; Isle of Skye, Scotland). In Europe, the thallus (the main lichen body) is minute (about 2–5 mm across) and never abundant, which likely contributes to under-recording; it was not found in large Macaronesian collections. Taken together, these records suggest it favours humid, low-elevation habitats on tree bark in oceanic climates.
