= Gregorella =

Scientific classification
- Domain: Eukaryota
- Kingdom: Fungi
- Division: Ascomycota
- Class: Lecanoromycetes
- Order: Baeomycetales
- Family: Arctomiaceae
- Genus: Gregorella; Lumbsch (2005)
- Species: G. humida

Binomial name
- Gregorella humida (Kullh.) Lumbsch (2005)

Synonyms
- Biatora humida Kullh. (1871); Lecidea humida (Kullh.) Th.Fr. (1874); Moelleropsis humida (Kullh.) Coppins & P.M.Jørg. (1993); Pannularia humida (Kullh.) Vain. (1934)

Single-species lichen genus

Gregorella is a fungal genus in the family Arctomiaceae. It is a monotypic genus, containing the single lichen species Gregorella humida. This lichen grows as a thin, ephemeral crust on damp, shaded bark or rock, appearing olive to dull grey-brown when dry but swelling slightly and turning bluish-grey after rain. It is built from tiny clusters of blue-green algae wrapped in fungal cells and reproduces through small, button-like fruiting bodies that contain eight colourless, oval ascospores lacking cross-walls.

== Taxonomy ==
The single species now placed in Gregorella was first published as Biatora humida in 1870; it later moved through several genera, including Lecidea, Leprocollema and, most recently, Moelleropsis because of its thin, granular thallus. Molecular work, however, showed that "Moelleropsis" humida is unrelated to the pannarioid lichens with which it had been grouped. A two-locus phylogeny (nuLSU and mtSSU rDNA) of 64 ascomycetes demonstrated that the species nests firmly inside the family Arctomiaceae, forming a well-supported sister relationship with the Tasmanian genus Wawea. Because it also differs morphologically from both Arctomia and Wawea—particularly in its goniocystic thallus and the structure of the ascus apex—Thorsten Lumbsch segregated it as the monotypic genus Gregorella in 2005.

Within Arctomiaceae the genus sits as sister to Wawea, and this pair in turn is sister to a monophyletic Arctomia. All three share external development of the apothecia and cyanobacterial photobionts, yet Gregorella can be distinguished by its ellipsoid, usually one-celled spores, the absence of an amyloid tholus in the ascus, and paraphyses whose tips remain thin-walled and unpigmented. Gregorella also lacks the multidivided apothecial discs of Arctomia and the pycnoascocarps characteristic of Wawea. Phylogenetically the family belongs to the subclass Ostropomycetidae rather than the mainly cyanolichen Peltigerineae, although its deeper affinities inside the subclass remain unresolved. The genus is presently known only from temperate western Europe, a range that contrasts with the bipolar or Tasmanian distributions of its closest relatives.

== Description ==
Gregorella humida grows as a thin, ephemeral crust that clings tightly to damp, shaded bark or rock. When dry the thallus looks olive to dull grey-brown, though even a light scratch or persistently shady spot produces a bluish cast; after rain it swells slightly and turns bluish-grey. Under a hand lens the surface appears granular rather than smooth because it is built from rounded goniocysts—tiny clusters (30–60 μm across) in which Nostoc cyanobacterial cells are wrapped in a skin of minute, equally sized fungal cells. A separate protective cortex is lacking, and no powdery propagules (isidia or soredia) develop. Standard chemical spot tests and thin-layer chromatography have failed to detect secondary metabolites.

Sexual reproduction is common. The small, stalkless apothecia (0.3–0.5 mm wide) sit flush with the thallus yet are pinched in at the base, giving a button-like profile. Young discs are colourless but soon become red-brown and, when wet, pale to honey-brown; any basal rim of thallus tissue quickly erodes so most mature apothecia look rimless. The outer wall (exciple) forms a yellowish ring of long-celled hyphae, while the interior hymenium remains clear and lacks the typical amyloid reaction in iodine. Delicate, narrowly cylindrical asci each contain eight colourless, ellipsoidal spores (12.5–24 × 6.5–9.5 μm) that lack cross-walls (septa), although a faint pseudoseptum may appear with age. The filaments between the asci (paraphyses) are only 1–1.5 μm thick, unbranched or sparsely branched, and separate easily when mounted in water—a feature that, together with the particular structure of the ascus tip, sets Gregorella apart from its former host genus Fuscopannaria. No asexual pycnidia have been observed in the species.
