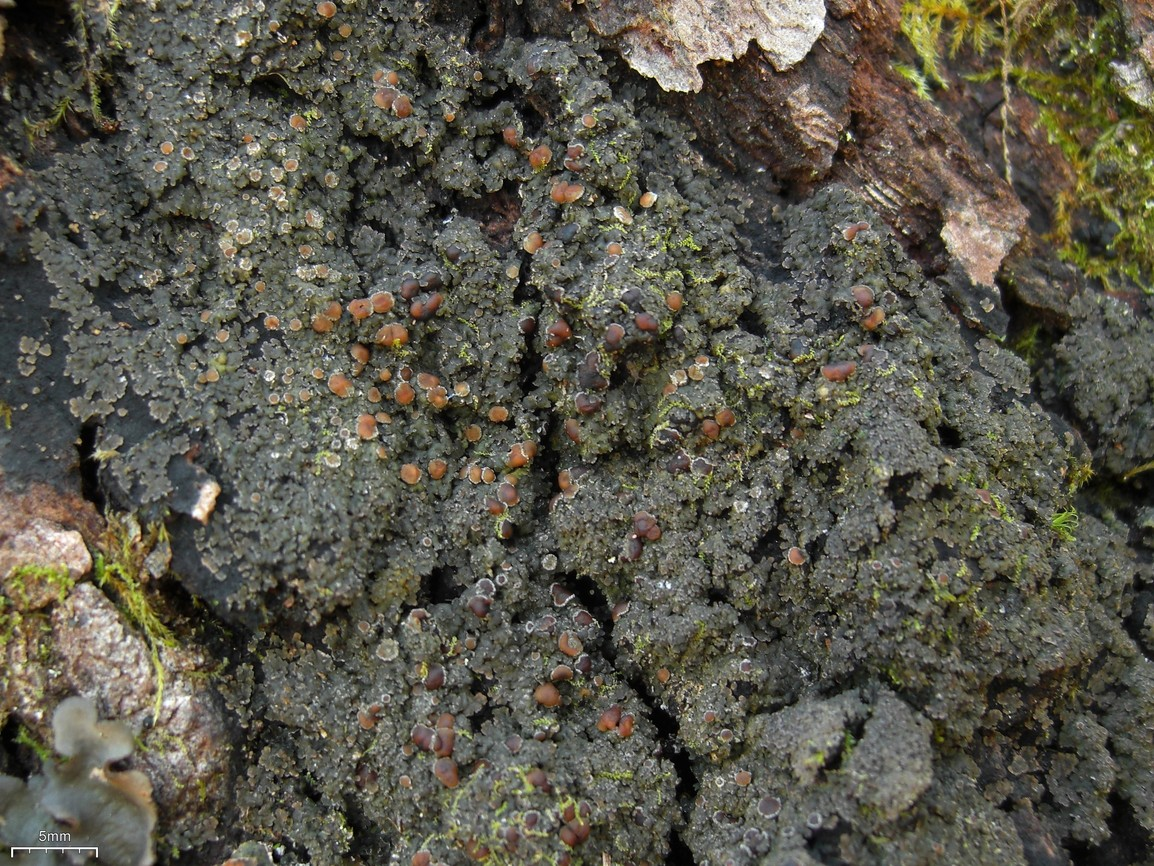

Conservation status
- Apparently Secure (NatureServe)

Scientific classification
- Kingdom: Fungi
- Division: Ascomycota
- Class: Lecanoromycetes
- Order: Peltigerales
- Family: Pannariaceae
- Genus: Fuscopannaria
- Species: F. leucosticta

Binomial name
- Fuscopannaria leucosticta (Tuck. ex E.Michener) P.M.Jørg. (1994)

Synonyms
- Parmelia leucosticta Tuck. ex E.Michener (1853); Pannaria craspedia var. leucosticta (Tuck. ex E.Michener) Trevis. (1869); Pannaria lepidiota subsp. leucosticta (Tuck. ex E.Michener) Nyl. (1869); Pannaria leucosticta (Tuck. ex E.Michener) Nyl. (1859); Pannularia leucosticta (Tuck. ex E.Michener) Stizenb. (1887)

= Fuscopannaria leucosticta =

Species of lichen

Fuscopannaria leucosticta, commonly known as the rimmed shingle lichen, is a species of lichen in the family Pannariaceae. It has a squamulose (scaley) thallus that lacks soredia and isidia (vegetative propagules), but has abundant apothecia (spore-bearing structures) with distinct white rims. Although its main centres of distribution are eastern North America and southeast Asia, where it grows in damp forests, it has been reported from various other high-altitude, humid locations.

== Taxonomy ==
The lichen was first formally described by Edward Tuckerman in 1853 from specimens collected in the eastern United States. He placed it in the genus Parmelia, the customary generic placement for most foliose species at the time. By 1859 he described it as a member of Pannaria.

In more modern times (1994), Per Magnus Jørgensen transferred it to the newly circumscribed genus Fuscopannaria, in which it is the type species. This genus contains largely temperate to arctic–alpine lichens, mostly small-squamulose species with amyloid apical structures in the asci that contain fatty acids and terpenoids. Fuscopannaria is species rich in the East Asian flora, particularly the F. leucosticta group. This includes the following species and their distributional centres: F. dispersa (China), F. dissecta (Japan), F. poeltii (Nepal, Tibet), F. leucosticta (widespread), F. protensa (Japan & Korea) and F. siamensis (Thailand).

In North America, Fuscopannaria leucosticta is commonly known as the "rimmed shingle lichen".

== Description ==
The lichen has plentiful squamules that are round or have a scalloped edge, measuring 2–3 mm in diameter and displaying chestnut-brown coloration. These squamules have white felty margins and are frequently found on a black prothallus. The lichen does not have any soredia or isidia. Additionally, lecanorine apothecia with notable white rims are typically visible. The ascospores of this lichen are 23–27 by 9–11 μm and have a relatively thick, transparent outer wall that often narrows to a fine point at one or both ends.

All of the standard chemical spot tests are negative in Fuscopannaria leucosticta.

=== Similar species ===
Two sorediate counterparts Fuscopannaria leucosticta are F. coerulescens from Nepal and New Guinea and F. sorediata from eastern North America and Japan. Fuscopannaria rugosa, described from China in 2016, differs from F. leucosticta in its foliose-squamulose thallus, longitudinally wrinkled upper surface, and highly convex discs. The similarly named Fuscopannaria leucostictoides, found on the west coast of northern North America, is grayer in colour, does not have pointed spores, and contains atranorin.

== Habitat, distribution, and conservation ==
Fuscopannaria leucosticta used to be widely distributed in temperate eastern North America, but its range has declined due to habitat destruction and reduction. In eastern Canada, it prefers old, wet forests. Its distribution includes Central America and the Caribbean, extending as far south as Cuba. In Mexico, it is found at a high-elevation location (2,400 m (7,900 ft) in a misty montane of pine-oak forest in Chiapas. It is typically found growing on bark, although it has been occasionally recorded growing on rock, usually with mosses.

A study of its habitat associations and distributions in Nova Scotia, Canada, indicate that the predicted distribution of this lichen is most affected by temperature. In the early 2000s, it had been designated "Yellow" status in Nova Scotia's species at risk list, indicating the species is sensitive and may require special attention to prevent extinction or extirpation. Because of its rarity in Eastern Canada, its distribution and population size are uncertain, making conservation planning difficult. A MaxEnt (Maximum Entropy, a machine learning algorithm used for predicting the distribution of species or other phenomena based on environmental variables) distribution model incorporating various environmental variables, including cedar presence and lack of human-induced disturbance, predicted high probability areas, and subsequent field verifications revealed 13 previously unsurveyed locations with high probability of occurrence, which can help guide future conservation efforts for the management of rare and at-risk species.

In 2007, Fuscopannaria leucosticta was reported from Ecuador, which the authors noted as "remarkable" due to the lack of any known collections in intermediate areas; they suggested it may be an example of a long-distance dispersal, or a relict species. Another surprising record was that from Tanzania the year prior. According to Jørgensen and Sipman, this record from the Uluguru forest region indicates the ancient history of the species and its existence around the Tertiary Madro-Tethyan sea (other relict species are found in the forest). It seems to have expanded southward through the familiar pathway established by the Tertiary forests of Egypt and the Sudan into East Africa. In these tropical and subtropical locations, the lichen was found high-elevation (above 2,000 m (6,600 ft)), mountainous "mist zones", emphasizing their requirement for humid environments. Although very rare in Europe, F. leucosticta was rediscovered there in 2006 when a specimen was found in Greece–the first collection of the species in over a century.
