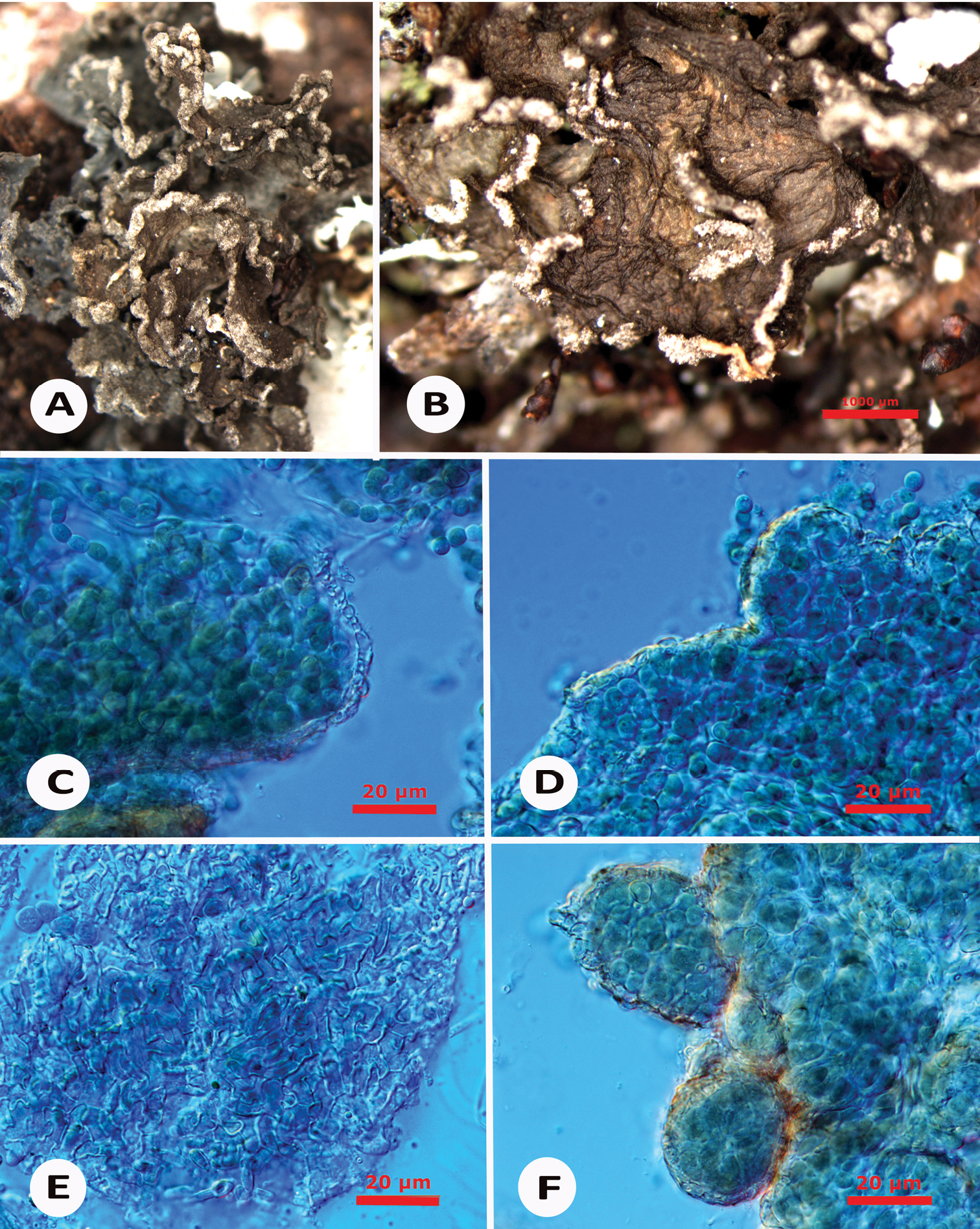
- Holotype of Arctomia borbonica. A–B macroscopic view of the thallus, with details of the wrinkled surface B and soredioid margin C–D cross section through the thallus, showing the cortex with small, isodiametric cells, and the Nostoc chains E surface view of the cortex F young goniocysts formed at the lobe margins. Scale: A–B = 1 mm; C–E = 20 µm.

Scientific classification
- Domain: Eukaryota
- Kingdom: Fungi
- Division: Ascomycota
- Class: Lecanoromycetes
- Order: Baeomycetales
- Family: Arctomiaceae
- Genus: Gabura
- Species: G. borbonica

Binomial name
- Gabura borbonica (Magain & Sérus.) Magain & Sérus. (2020)

Synonyms
- Arctomia borbonica Magain & Sérus. (2012)

= Gabura borbonica =

Species of lichen

Gabura borbonica, previously known as Arctomia borbonica, is a species of foliose lichen found on Réunion, an island in the Mascarene archipelago. This species is unique due to its distinct features such as a crumpled, blue-grey to brown thallus (the main body of the lichen) and the production of structures called goniocysts at its margins. G. borbonica was transferred to the genus Gabura in 2020, and is distinguished from its sister species, Gabura insignis, both genetically and morphologically.

== Taxonomy ==
Gabura borbonica was originally described as "Arctomia borbonica" in 2012 by lichenologists Nicolas Magain and Emmanuël Sérusiaux. The type specimen was collected by the authors from the Forêt de Bébour in Réunion, at an altitude of 1,850 m (6,070 ft). In 2020, the authors transferred the taxon to the genus Gabura based on molecular and morphological analysis, to help resolve issues of morphological and anatomical heterogeneity in the genus Arctomia. G. borbonica was found to share a most recent common ancestor with European and North American representatives of Gabura insignis, and is the most morphologically distinct taxon within the G. insignis group.

== Description ==
Gabura borbonica is recognised by its foliose (leaf-like) thallus, which is typically crumpled and varies in colour from blue-grey to brown. The thallus does not typically exceed 1 cm in diameter, and lobes, when well-developed, are up to 0.2–0.3 mm wide. The surface of the lichen is often wrinkled, even in young lobes. A notable characteristic of G. borbonica is the formation of goniocysts, primarily at the margins but also on the upper surface. These goniocysts contain chains of cyanobacterial Nostoc cells. When mature, the goniocysts disrupt to form a soredioid margin.

== Similar species ==
Gabura borbonica is readily distinguished from its sister species, Gabura insignis, in both genetic and morphological aspects. G. borbonica was initially considered similar to Arctomia insignis and was even synonymised with it, despite the lack of genetic evidence. However, it is now recognised as a separate species within the genus Gabura.

== Habitat and distribution ==
Gabura borbonica has been found in various sites across Réunion Island, including in highly disturbed secondary thickets with Eucalyptus plantations. It has been observed growing on trunks of Eucalyptus and Acacia heterophylla trees, as well as on the main stems of Erica thickets. The species appears to be widespread across the island and is found in typical habitats such as the Acacia mountain forest and the Philippia mountain thicket.
