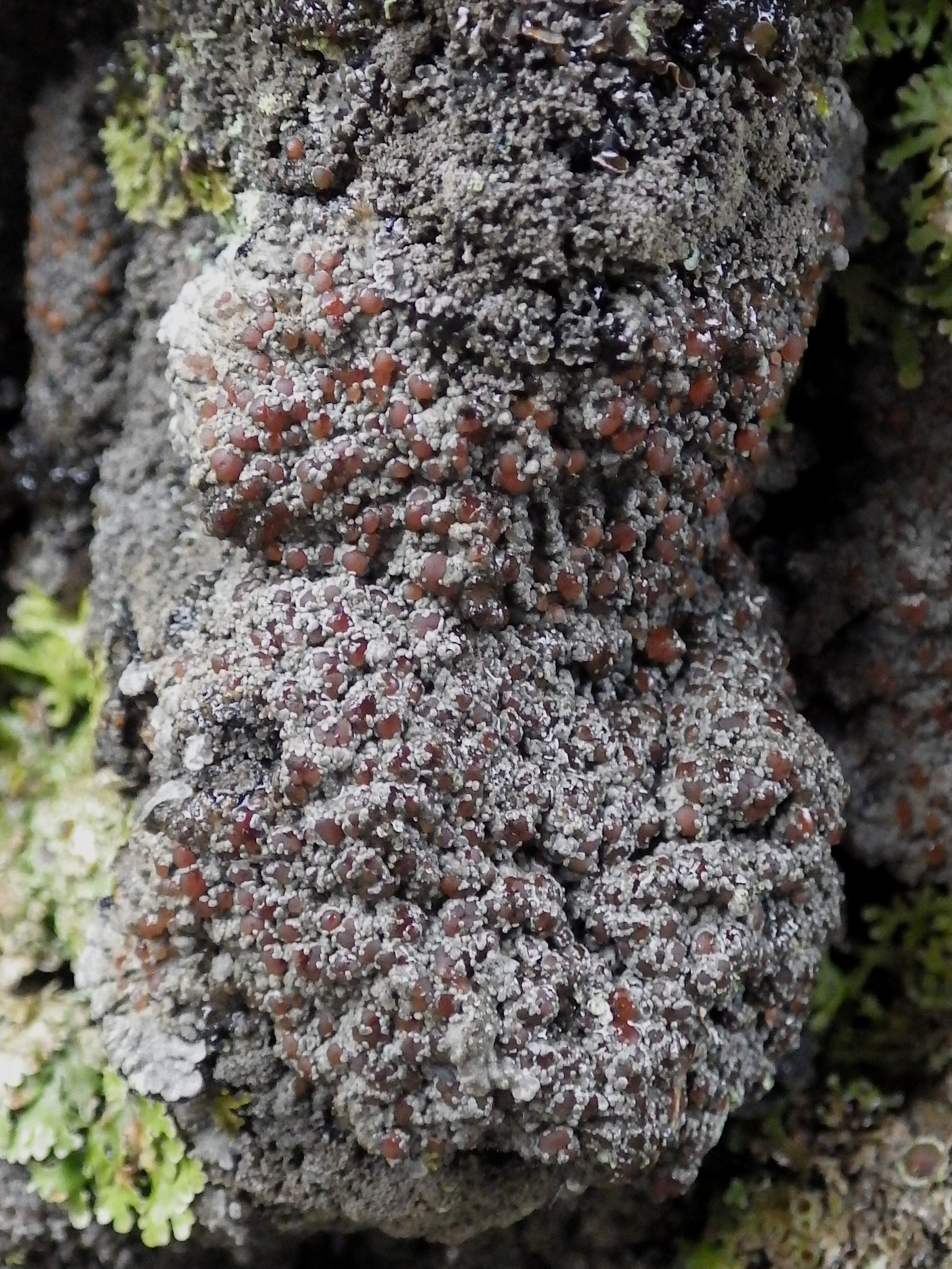
- in Portugal

Scientific classification
- Domain: Eukaryota
- Kingdom: Fungi
- Division: Ascomycota
- Class: Lecanoromycetes
- Order: Peltigerales
- Family: Vahliellaceae
- Genus: Vahliella
- Species: V. atlantica

Binomial name
- Vahliella atlantica (P.M.Jørg. & P.James) P.M.Jørg. (2008)

Synonyms
- Fuscopannaria atlantica P.M.Jørg. & P.James (2005)

= Vahliella atlantica =

Species of lichen

Vahliella atlantica is a species of squamulose lichen in the family Vahliellaceae. It was first scientifically described as a new species in 2005 by the lichenologists Per Magnus Jørgensen and Peter Wilfred James, who classified it as a member of Fuscopannaria. The type specimen was collected by James from Santa Maria Island in the Azores. Jørgensen transferred the taxon to the new genus Vahliella in 2008.
