= Vahliella hookerioides =

Scientific classification
- Domain: Eukaryota
- Kingdom: Fungi
- Division: Ascomycota
- Class: Lecanoromycetes
- Order: Peltigerales
- Family: Vahliellaceae
- Genus: Vahliella
- Species: V. hookerioides

Binomial name
- Vahliella hookerioides (P.M.Jørg.) P.M.Jørg. (2008)

Synonyms
- Fuscopannaria hookerioides P.M.Jørg. (2000)

Species of lichen

Vahliella hookerioides is a species of squamulose lichen in the family Vahliellaceae. It was first formally described in 2000 by the Norwegian lichenologist Per Magnus Jørgensen, who classified it as a member of Fuscopannaria. The type specimen was collected from Endovalley in Colorado, US. It is similar in morphology to V. leucophaea but has blackich apothecia, a more robust thalline margin, and smaller, more rounded spores. Jørgensen transferred the taxon to the new genus Vahliella in 2008.
