= Vahliella globigera =

Conservation status
- Critically Imperiled (NatureServe)

Scientific classification
- Kingdom: Fungi
- Division: Ascomycota
- Class: Lecanoromycetes
- Order: Peltigerales
- Family: Vahliellaceae
- Genus: Vahliella
- Species: V. globigera

Binomial name
- Vahliella globigera (Fryday & P.M.Jørg.) P.M.Jørg. (2008)

Synonyms
- Fuscopannaria globigera Fryday & P.M.Jørg. (2004)

Species of lichen

Vahliella globigera is a species of ground- and moss-dwelling squamulose lichen in the family Vahliellaceae. Found in Alaska, it was described as a new species in 2004 by the lichenologists Alan Fryday and Per Magnus Jørgensen, who classified it in the genus Fuscopannaria; they initially spelled the species epithet as globuligera. The type specimen was collected by Fryday in North Slope Borough, Alaska, on a bank beside a track to the International Tundra Experiment site. Jørgensen transferred it to the new genus Vahliella in 2008. It is the only species in the genus known to contain green algae; the remainder of Vahliella species utilize Nostoc (a cyanobacterium) as a photobiont partner.
