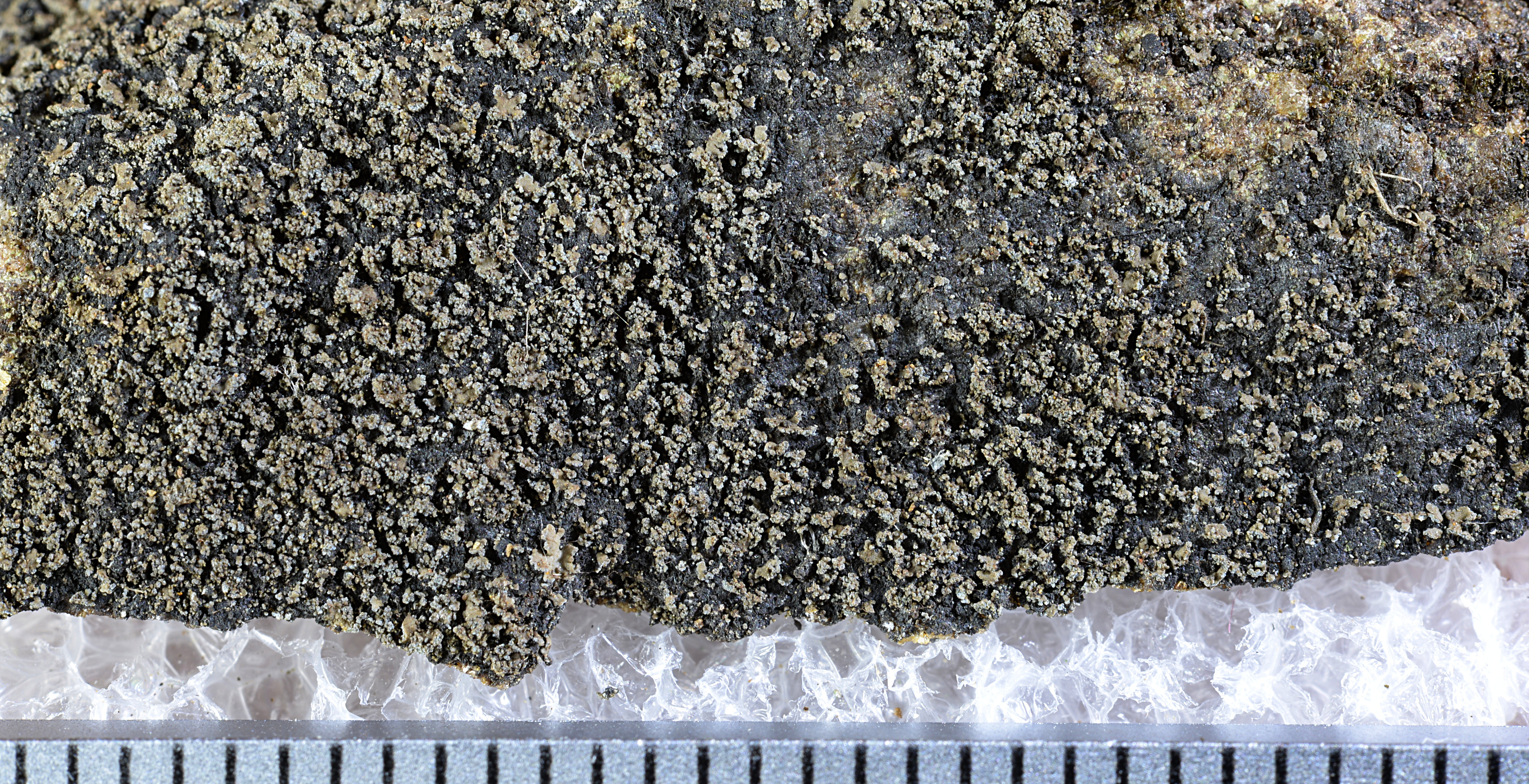

Scientific classification
- Domain: Eukaryota
- Kingdom: Fungi
- Division: Ascomycota
- Class: Lecanoromycetes
- Order: Peltigerales
- Family: Pannariaceae
- Genus: Fuscopannaria
- Species: F. confusa

Binomial name
- Fuscopannaria confusa (P.M.Jørg.) P.M.Jørg. (1994)

Synonyms
- Pannaria confusa P.M.Jørg. (1991)

= Fuscopannaria confusa =

Species of lichen

Fuscopannaria confusa is a species of squamulose lichen belonging to the family Pannariaceae.

It is native to Eurasia and Northern America.

== Taxonomy ==
Fuscopannaria confusa was first described by Norwegian lichenologist Per Magnus Jørgensen in 1991, initially as a member of the genus Pannaria. In 1994, he reclassified it in the Fuscopannaria, a genus that comprises about 46 species within the family Pannariaceae. Molecular investigations have shown that the genera Fuscopannaria and the closely related Parmeliella are not phylogenetic sister groups, with each being more closely related to other genera within the Pannariaceae.

The taxonomic status of F. confusa was clarified through phylogenetic analysis of multi-locus DNA sequences from three unlinked genetic regions. This analysis demonstrated that F. confusa is genetically distinct from morphologically similar species such as F. ahlneri, F. mediterranea, and Parmeliella parvula.

== Description ==
Fuscopannaria confusa is a small, squamulose lichen characterized by its greyish to brownish thallus (the main body of the lichen) that grows attached to a distinctive bluish-black hypothallus (the underlying fungal layer). The thallus consists of small squamules—scale-like structures typically measuring up to 0.8 mm in width—that are uniformly grey in colouration. The species reproduces asexually through soredia, which are powdery propagules containing both fungal and algal components, and rarely develops apothecia (fruiting bodies).

Distinguishing F. confusa from similar species can be challenging due to morphological similarities. It most closely resembles Parmeliella parvula, with both species featuring uniformly grey squamules and soralia. Chemical analysis reveals that F. confusa contains two unknown fatty acids and one unknown triterpenoid, which manifest as needle-like crystals in the soralia of herbarium specimens—a feature that P. parvula lacks. In contrast, Fuscopannaria mediterranea can be differentiated by its larger, more olivaceous-brown squamules with contrasting blue-grey soralia. Fuscopannaria ahlneri is more readily distinguishable, having more prolonged and wider lobes (up to 1.5 mm wide compared to F. confusa's 0.8 mm).

Accurate identification of F. confusa may require thin-layer chromatography or DNA sequencing, particularly to distinguish it from P. parvula, as the morphological differences are subtle. Multi-locus DNA sequencing has confirmed that despite physical similarities, these species are genetically distinct, with F. confusa representing a separate evolutionary lineage within the family Pannariaceae.

== Habitat and distribution ==
Fuscopannaria confusa inhabits very humid environments within boreal forest ecosystems, with a particular preference for brook ravines and the spray zones near waterfalls. The species demonstrates a slightly continental distribution pattern, primarily occurring in central and eastern Norway, though ecological modeling suggests its potential range may extend further north. It is most commonly found in the middle boreal vegetation zone, with some populations in the northern boreal zone, but appears less frequently in the southern boreal areas.

Unlike some related Fuscopannaria species that grow on deciduous trees or calcareous rock formations, F. confusa shows a strong association with natural Picea-dominated forest environments. While often found on spruce twigs, the species requires specific microclimatic conditions characterized by consistent high humidity and minimal disturbance. Distribution modeling analysis indicates that suitable habitats may exist beyond currently documented locations, particularly in areas with proper moisture regulation from mires and swamps that prevent extreme fluctuations in water flow during dry periods.

== Conservation ==
Fuscopannaria confusa faces significant conservation challenges and is classified as Endangered (EN) on the Norwegian Regional Red List. The species' highly specific habitat requirements make it particularly vulnerable to environmental changes. Two primary threats have been identified: widespread clear-cut logging practices and hydroelectric power development, both of which have substantially reduced suitable habitat availability since the late 19th century.

The lichen's dependence on spray zones near waterfalls makes it especially susceptible to alterations in water flow regimes. Many populations are restricted to small forest patches, increasing their vulnerability to random events and localized disturbances that alter sunlight exposure and wind patterns. Conservation efforts are complicated by the species' limited distribution and the continuing decline of appropriate habitat. Effective protection requires preserving not only the immediate growth substrate but also the surrounding forest ecosystem that maintains the necessary microclimatic conditions. Continued mapping efforts across potential habitat regions are needed to fully assess its global conservation status.
