= Vahliella isidioidea =

Scientific classification
- Kingdom: Fungi
- Division: Ascomycota
- Class: Lecanoromycetes
- Order: Peltigerales
- Family: Vahliellaceae
- Genus: Vahliella
- Species: V. isidioidea

Binomial name
- Vahliella isidioidea Pérez-Vargas, Hern.-Padr., van den Boom & P.M.Jørg. (2014)
- Holotype: La Esperanza, Tenerife

Species of lichen

Vahliella isidioidea is a soil- and moss-dwelling species of squamulose lichen in the family Vahliellaceae. Found in the Canary Islands, it was formally described as a new species in 2014. The holotype specimen was collected in March 2008 from the Canary Islands, specifically from an area called "Pista de El Acebiñal" near La Esperanza on Tenerife. This location sits at an elevation of 1200 metres above sea level. The specimen was found growing on consolidated soil alongside bryophytes. The species epithet refers to the isidia-like appearance of the thallus.
