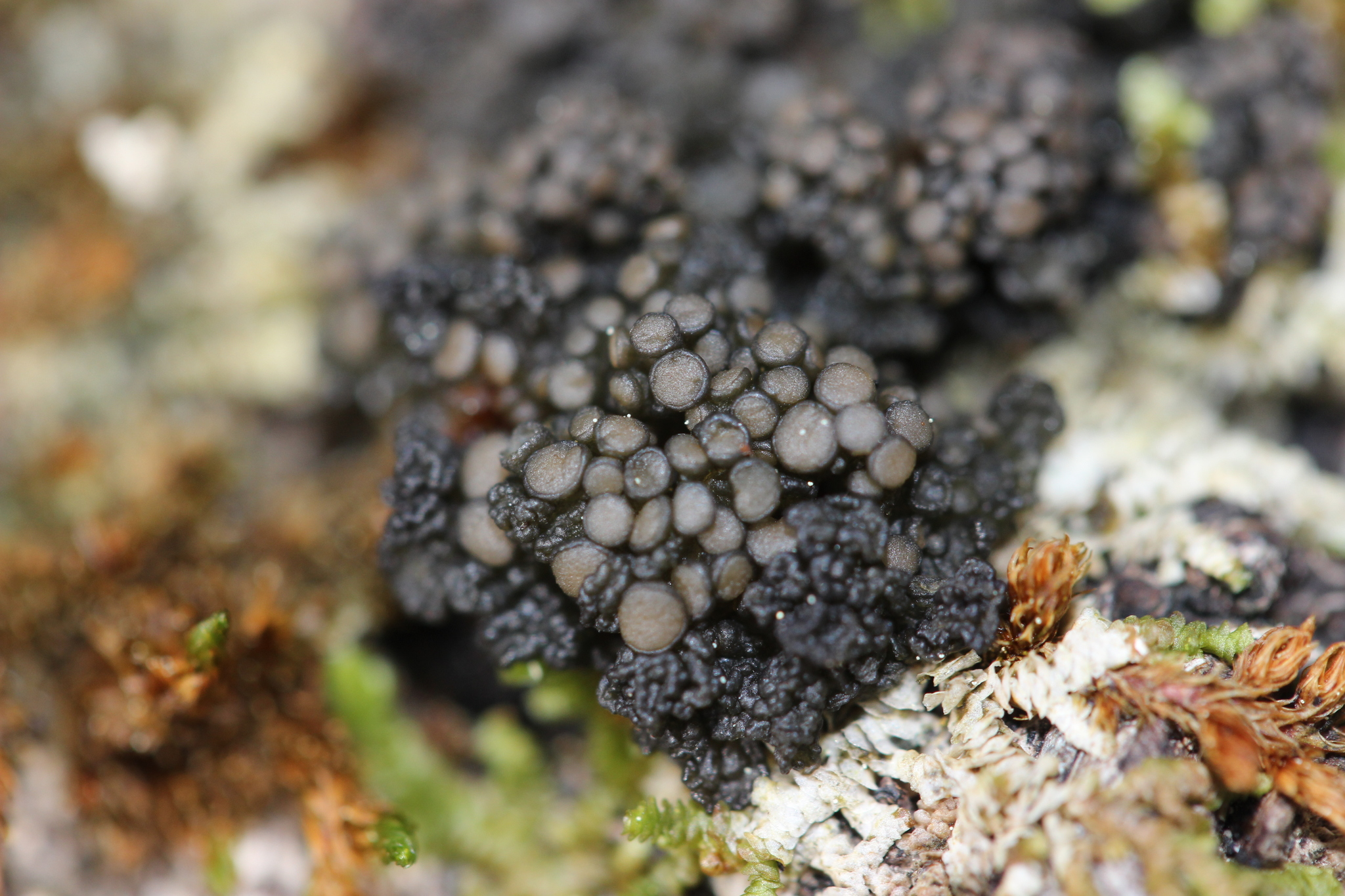

Scientific classification
- Kingdom: Fungi
- Division: Ascomycota
- Class: Lecanoromycetes
- Order: Baeomycetales
- Family: Arctomiaceae
- Genus: Gabura
- Species: G. fascicularis

Binomial name
- Gabura fascicularis (L.) P.M.Jørg. (2014)

Synonyms
- List: Lichen fascicularis L. (1767); Collema fasciculare (L.) F.H.Wigg. (1780); Parmelia fascicularis (L.) Ach. (1803); Enchylium fasciculare (L.) Gray (1821); Parmelia nigrescens var. fascicularis (L.) Schaer. (1842); Parmelia rupestris var. fascicularis (L.) Schaer. (1842); Collema rupestre var. fasciculare (L.) Rabenh. (1845); Collema nigrescens var. fasciculare (L.) Flot. (1850); Collema vespertilio var. fasciculare (L.) Flot. (1850); Lathagrium fasciculare (L.) A.Massal. (1853); Collema rupestre f. fasciculare (L.) Bosch (1853); Synechoblastus fascicularis (L.) A.L.Sm. (1918); Arctomia fascicularis (L.) Otálora & Wedin (2013); Collema fasciculare var. colensoi C.Bab. (1855); Synechoblastus aggregatus var. colensoi (C.Bab.) Müll.Arg. (1896); Collema aggregatum var. colensoi (C.Bab.) Zahlbr. (1924); Arctomia fascicularis var. colensoi (C.Bab.) de Lange (2017); Gabura fascicularis var. colensoi (C.Bab.) de Lange & M.Ford (2020)

= Gabura fascicularis =

Species of lichen-forming fungus

Gabura fascicularis is a species of jelly lichen in the family Arctomiaceae. It is widely distributed, found across parts of Europe, North Africa, Asia, Australia, and New Zealand. Originally described by Carl Linnaeus in 1767, this small cushion-forming lichen grows primarily on the bark of mature broad-leaved trees such as elm and ash, preferring moist, shaded woodland habitats. The species has a distinctive gelatinous texture when wet and contains cyanobacteria that allow it to fix nitrogen from the atmosphere. Once more widespread, G. fascicularis has declined significantly in many regions due to the loss of old-growth trees and environmental pressures like acid rain, leading to its classification as a near-threatened species in Britain. Molecular studies have revealed that the species may actually comprise two separate groups—one in Europe and another in the Southern Hemisphere—though further research is needed to confirm this distinction.

== Taxonomy ==
The species was first described by Carl Linnaeus in 1767 as Lichen fascicularis in the second part of his Mantissa Plantarum, where he diagnosed it in Latin as a "gelatinous, foliose lichen with clustered, turbinate tubercles larger than the thallus lobes" (L. foliaceus gelatinosus, tuberculis turbinatis fasciculatis fronde majoribus). In his treatment Linnaeus cited Dillenius's Historia Muscorum (1741) as a source of illustration and habitat information, noting records from Sussex, England. Two sheets are preserved in the Linnaean Herbarium (LINN), neither annotated by Linnaeus himself. One of these, LINN 1273.141, was later selected as lectotype by Gunnar Degelius (1954). This specimen bears an annotation by Linnaeus's son (Carl Linnaeus the Younger), who is also named as the collector in the protologue, and was almost certainly gathered during an excursion near Stenbrohult in Småland. The choice of lectotype reflects that much of the descriptive and curatorial work on lichens in the Linnaean period was being undertaken by Linnaeus's son rather than Linnaeus himself.

For much of the nineteenth and twentieth centuries the taxon was maintained in the genus Collema, under the name Collema fasciculare, on account of its gelatinous, homoiomerous thallus. Molecular evidence later showed that this placement was misleading. A three-locus phylogeny by Otálora and Wedin demonstrated that C. fasciculare is not part of Collemataceae or Peltigerales, but belongs in Arctomiaceae. On this basis they created the combination Arctomia fascicularis and argued that, despite a somewhat different ascoma development, the "Fasciculare group" was best accommodated within Arctomiaceae; they also transferred three allied tropical species into Arctomia.

Soon afterwards, Per Magnus Jørgensen reinstated the long-dormant genus Gabura and transferred the species as Gabura fascicularis, recognising that it was morphologically and phylogenetically distinct from Arctomia in the strict sense. This treatment was later supported by Magain and co-authors, whose four-locus phylogeny recovered Gabura as a coherent lineage, with G. fascicularis sister to the G. insignis/G. borbonica complex. Their analyses also indicated that collections identified as G. fascicularis actually fall into two well-supported, geographically disjunct clades, one in Europe (Spain and Sweden) and another in the Southern Hemisphere (Chile and New Zealand). The authors recommended caution and further sampling before any formal taxonomic changes are made. In the same study Arctomia insignis and A. borbonica were formally transferred into Gabura, narrowing Arctomia to just two species.

At the infraspecific level, de Lange and Ford (2020) provided two new combinations under Gabura fascicularis: var. colensoi (originally Collema fasciculare var. colensoi C.Bab., 1855) and var. microcarpa (originally Synechoblastus microcarpus Müll.Arg., 1882). These were effectively published in Index Fungorum in July 2020, regularising long-used varietal names with the current genus placement.

== Description ==
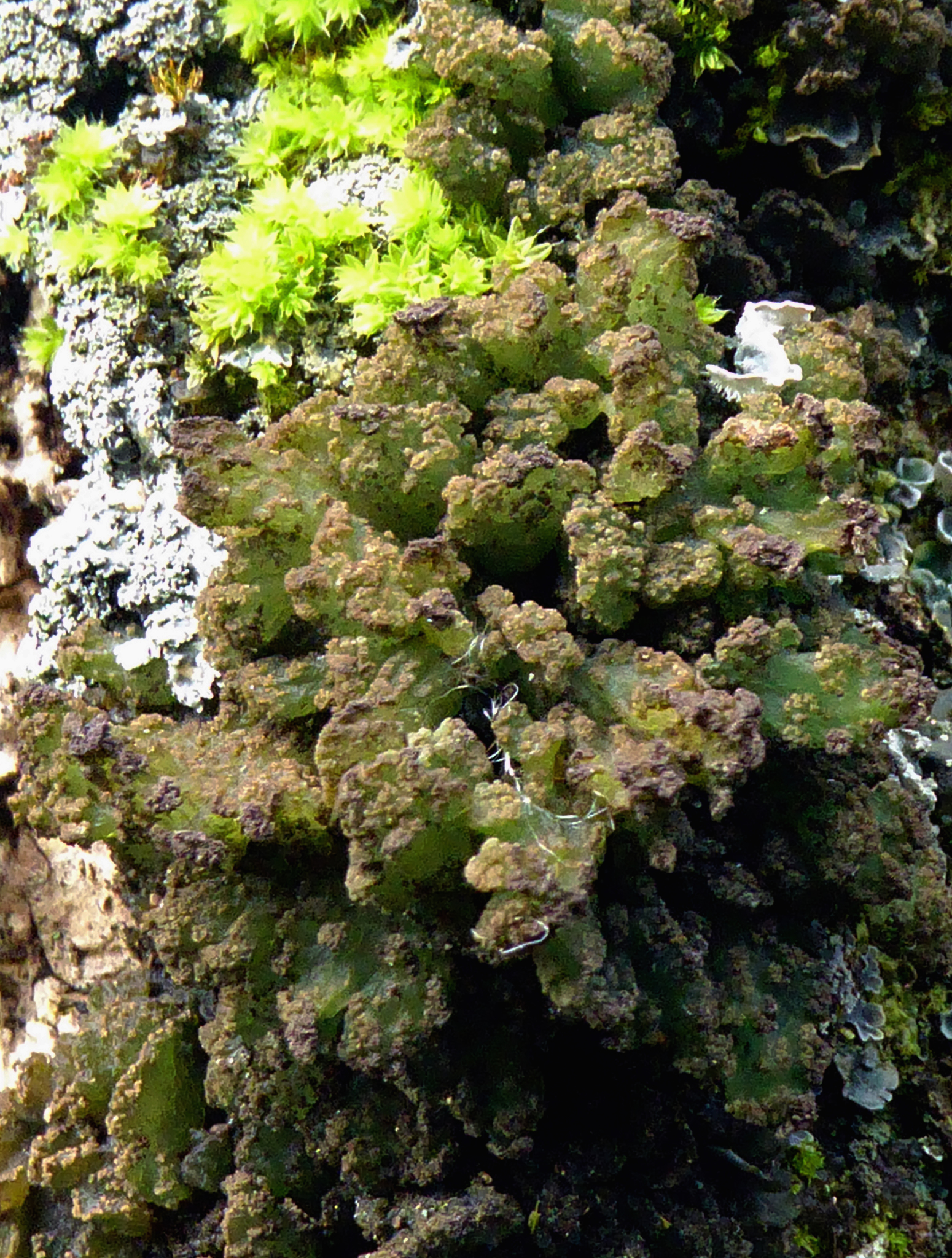
Gabura fasciculare growing on tree bark in New Zealand, showing the characteristic small, cushion-like thalli with their coarsely wrinkled, nodulose surface typical of this jelly lichen species

The thallus (lichen body) forms small, rounded cushions to about 1.5 cm across. It is crustose to small-foliose and very swollen and pulpy when hydrated, reaching about 10 mm thick. The surface is coarsely nodulose-wrinkled and only indistinctly lobed; when present, the lobes are short, flattened, closely appressed and often overlapping, with tiny secondary lobules that arise from the wrinkles. The upper surface is dark olive-green to brown-black in the dry state, turning grey-green to olivaceous when wet, and is usually strongly ridged. Vegetative propagules are absent: there are no isidia or soredia (outgrowths or powdery patches used by many lichens for asexual dispersal).

Apothecia (disc-like fruiting bodies) develop from the lobules. Although not always abundant, but when present the apothecia can be numerous and conspicuous, often covering the thallus surface. The discs are 0.8–2 mm across, usually flat, the same colour as the thallus, and commonly bordered by a thick, somewhat wrinkled rim of thallus tissue (a thalline margin). The asci (spore sacs) usually contain eight spores (sometimes six). The ascospores measure 50–95 × 4.5–5 micrometres, are divided by 9–16 cross-walls (septae), are vermiform or "worm-like", and lie helically twisted inside the ascus; they often taper at one or both ends and lack any surrounding gelatinous sheath.

== Habitat, distribution, and ecology ==
Gabura fascicularis is a widely distributed epiphytic lichen with a fragmented Holarctic range. It occurs in oceanic and sub-oceanic regions of Europe and has been recorded in adjacent parts of North Africa and Asia. The species is also present in the Southern Hemisphere, having been documented in Australasia (including Australia and New Zealand) as part of its cosmopolitan distribution.

This lichen grows primarily on the bark of old broad-leaved trees, especially those with relatively base-rich bark. In Europe, it has been found on mature elm (Ulmus) and ash (Fraxinus) trees, and occasionally on hazel (Corylus). It often occurs over mosses that carpet the bark or rock, and has even been recorded among mosses on calcareous rock outcrops. In the humid montane forests of Australasia, G. fascicularis inhabits very wet, shaded microhabitats on the lower parts of trees, such as understory branches and trunk buttresses. Throughout its range, it shows a preference for moist, shaded sites; in Britain, it "appears to favour moist, shady" woodland habitats.

Ecologically, Gabura fascicularis is a cyanolichen that contains a filamentous cyanobacterial photobiont (Nostoc), enabling it to fix atmospheric nitrogen. The lichen's occurrences are typically scattered and localized, reflecting its need for persistently humid conditions and undisturbed, mature substrates. The species was once more frequent, but G. fascicularis has declined in many areas due to the loss of mature host trees (such as elm populations decimated by disease) and environmental factors like acid rain. This decline has led to the species being regarded as rare or threatened in parts of its range; for instance, it is listed as a near-threatened species in Britain.

== See also ==
- List of lichens named by Carl Linnaeus
