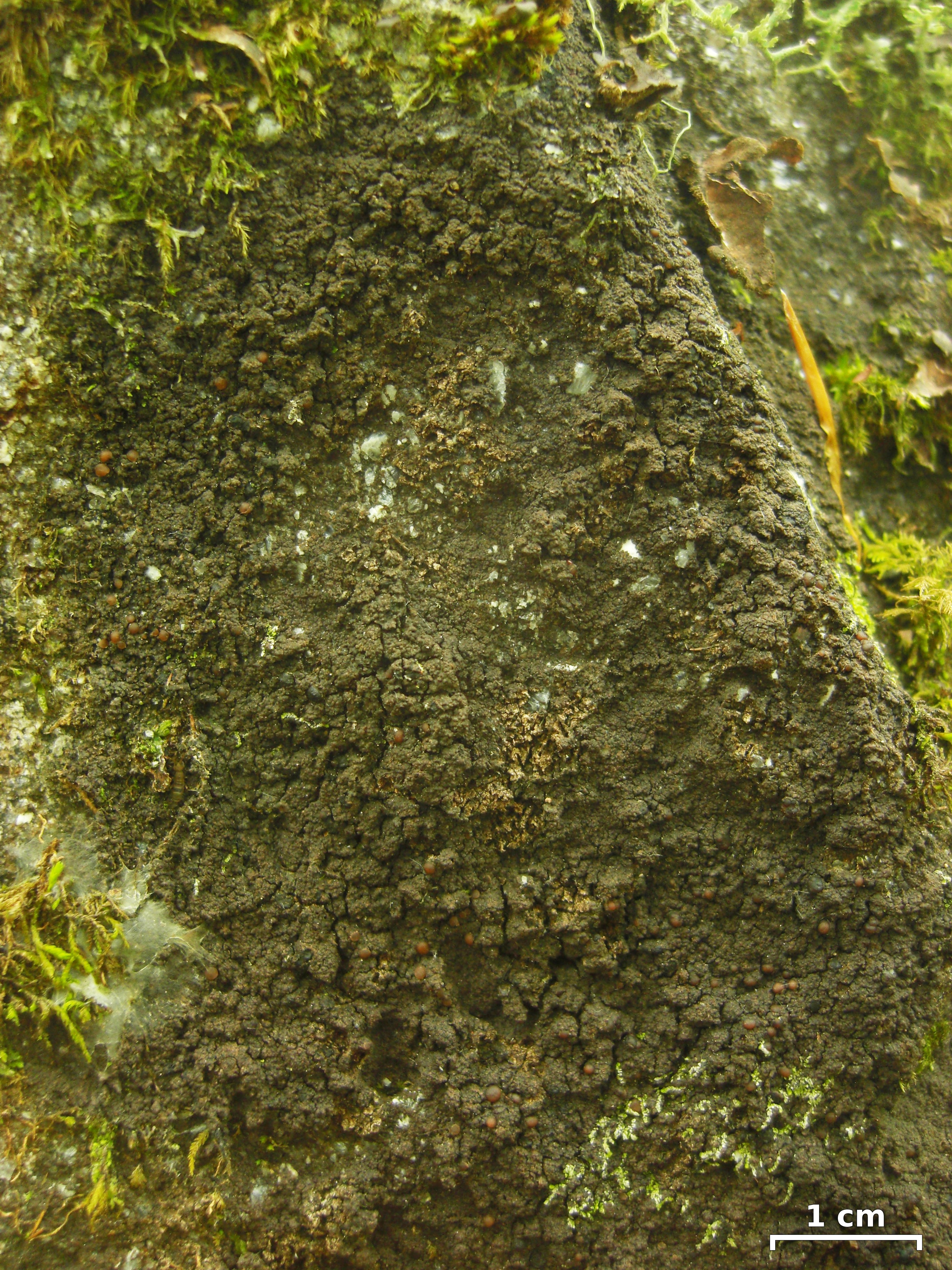
- Vahliella leucophaea

Scientific classification
- Kingdom: Fungi
- Division: Ascomycota
- Class: Lecanoromycetes
- Order: Peltigerales
- Family: Vahliellaceae; Wedin, P.M.Jørg. & S.Ekman (2010)
- Genus: Vahliella; P.M.Jørg. (2008)

Type species
- Vahliella leucophaea (Vahl) P.M.Jørg. (2008)

Species
- V. adnata V. atlantica V. californica V. globigera V. hookerioides V. isidioidea V. labrata V. leucophaea V. saubinetii

= Vahliella =

Genus of lichen-forming fungi

Vahliella is a genus of nine species of lichen-forming fungi in the order Peltigerales. It is the only member of Vahliellaceae, a family circumscribed in 2010 to contain this genus. Vahliella was formerly placed in the family Pannariaceae until molecular phylogenetics showed that it did not belong there. Vahliella species are found in the Northern Hemisphere – mainly in North America, but also in Europe and India.

Vahliella species somewhat resemble those of the genus Fuscopannaria – in which they were originally classified – but are distinguished from them by the layered apical amyloid sheets of the asci, the lack of lichen substances, and the absence of an epispore.

== Taxonomy ==
Vahliella was circumscribed by Norwegian botanist Per Magnus Jørgensen in 2008. It was created to contain species formerly placed in the subgenus Micropannaria of Fuscopannaria, a genus erected by Jørgensen in 1994. Micropannaria contained two species that differed mainly in the apical apparatus, where they featured amyloid sheets rather than a ring structure. At the time, Jørgensen did not believe that this distinguishing character was sufficiently different to justify these species being placed in a new genus. The type species of subgenus Micropannaria, Fuscopannaria leucophaea, was later shown in several phylogenetic studies to lie outside of the Fuscopannaria, and also outside family Pannariaceae, which was shown to be polyphyletic. To meet the need for a new familial placement of Vahliella, Mats Wedin, Jørgensen, and Stefan Ekman created the Vahliellaceae in 2010. Phylogenetically, Vahliellaceae is sister to a clade that contains Lobariaceae, Massalongiaceae, Nephromataceae, and Peltigeraceae.

The generic name Vahliella honours Norwegian botanist Martin Vahl (1749–1804), who was first to describe scientifically the type species of this genus.

== Description ==
=== Family ===
In its Latin circumscription, Vahliellaceae is defined by its differences from the Pannariaceae: the absence of lichen substances, a poorly developed thalline margin, and the amyloid apical layers.

Distinctions are also made between Vahliellaceae and other closely related families, the Peltigeraceae, Nephromataceae, and Lobariaceae. Peltigeraceae has a distinctive apical tube, while Nephromataceae lacks an amyloid apical structure. Lobariaceae has an indistinct amyloid layer, dissimilar to the structure in Vahliellaceae. Massalongiaceae contains squamulose members (i.e., covered with tiny scales) that resemble the Vahliellaceae, but Massalongiaceae lack the distinct bluish-black hypothallus characteristic of some Vahliellaceae species.

=== Genus ===
Vahliella species are characterized by a squamulose thallus that is typically greyish-brownish in colour. They have sessile apothecia with a variable thalline exciple, which in some apothecia is not at all developed, and with a likewise variable but always present proper margin. The hymenium is hemiamyloid (meaning it takes on a purplish-grey colour when treated with Melzer's reagent), and contains unbranched, septate paraphyses that have pigmented tips. The asci are 8-spored with sheet-like apical structures that are persistently blue-green when stained with iodine. The ascospores of Vahliella lichens are non-septate, with an ellipsoid shape; they do not have an epispore, but often have internal oil droplets.

Vahliella species do not have any reactions with lichen spot tests, and do not produce secondary compounds detectable with thin layer chromatography.

== Habitat and distribution ==
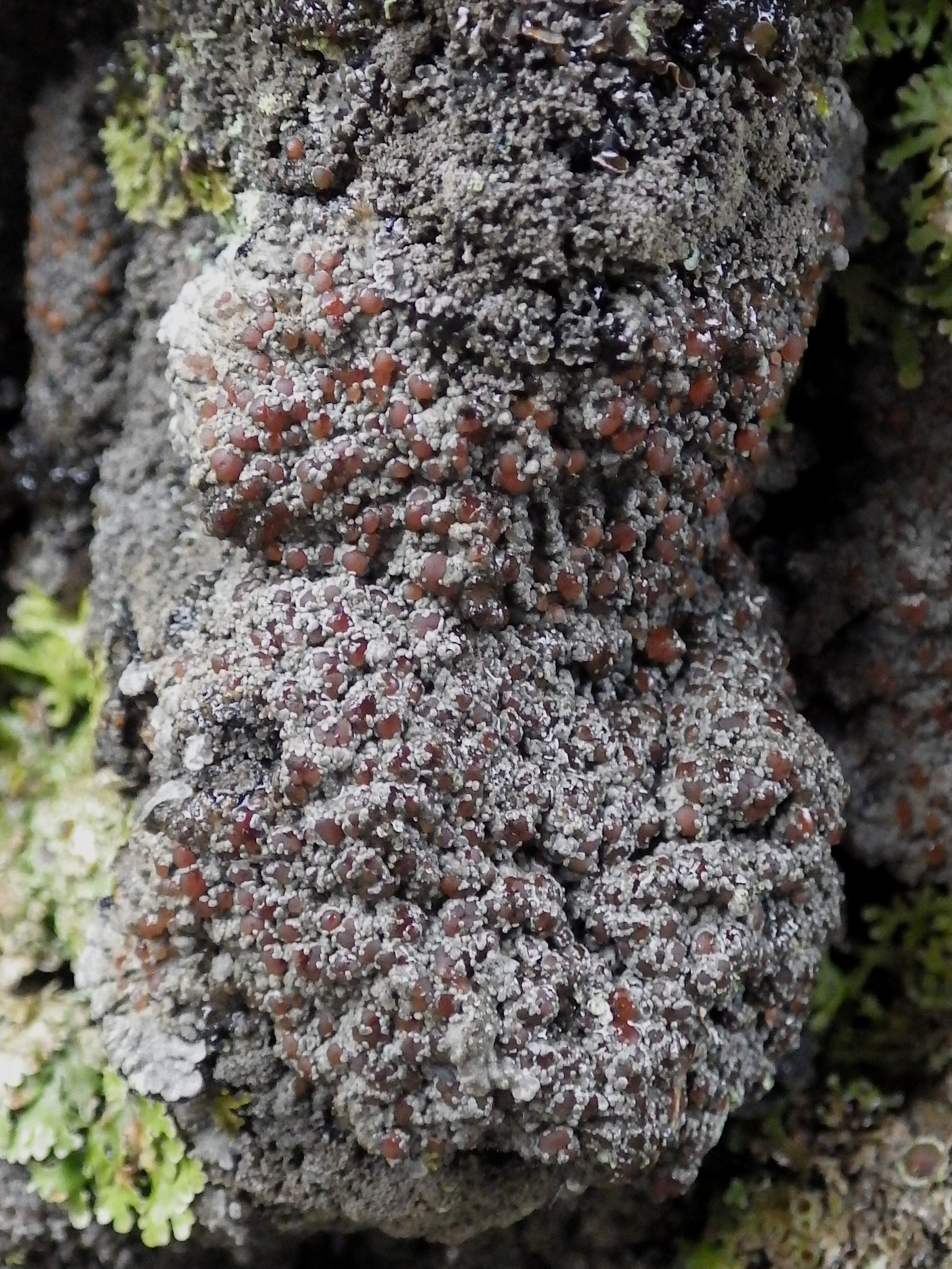
Vahliella atlantica, in Serra de São Mamede, Portugal

Most species of Vahliella are found in cool-temperate to arctic regions of Europe and North America, with an outlier in the mountains of India. Vahliella is a mainly saxicolous (rock-inhabiting) genus that has adapted to rather extreme habitats on maritime coasts (two species) and arctic-alpine or desert conditions. Only one species, V. saubinetii, is mainly corticolous (bark-inhabiting) and tends to be more warm-temperate (Mediterranean). The most recently described species, Vahliella isidioidea, grows on consolidated soil in the laurel forest of the Canary Islands.

== Species ==
As of November 2025, Species Fungorum (in the Catalogue of Life) accepts nine species of Vahliella:

- Vahliella adnata (P.M.Jørg. & Upreti) P.M.Jørg. (2008) – India
- Vahliella atlantica (P.M.Jørg. & P.James) P.M.Jørg. (2008) – Azores northwards to southwest Scandinavia
- Vahliella californica (Tuck.) P.M.Jørg. (2008) – United States
- Vahliella globigera (Fryday & P.M.Jørg.) P.M.Jørg. (2008) – Arctic
- Vahliella hookerioides (P.M.Jørg.) P.M.Jørg. (2008) – United States
- Vahliella isidioidea Pérez-Vargas, Hern.-Padr., van den Boom & P.M.Jørg. (2014) – Canary Islands
- Vahliella labrata (P.M.Jørg.) P.M.Jørg. (2008) – Channel Islands of California
- Vahliella leucophaea (Vahl) P.M.Jørg. (2008) – widespread in Northern Hemisphere
- Vahliella saubinetii (Mont.) P.M.Jørg. (2008) – European Mediterranean region; Atlantic and Pacific coastal regions of North America
