= Vahliella adnata =

Scientific classification
- Domain: Eukaryota
- Kingdom: Fungi
- Division: Ascomycota
- Class: Lecanoromycetes
- Order: Peltigerales
- Family: Vahliellaceae
- Genus: Vahliella
- Species: V. adnata

Binomial name
- Vahliella adnata (P.M.Jørg. & Upreti) P.M.Jørg. (2008)

Synonyms
- Fuscopannaria adnata P.M.Jørg. & Upreti (2005)

Species of lichen

Vahliella adnata is a species of rock-dwelling squamulose lichen in the family Vahliellaceae. Found in Tamil Nadu, India, it was described as a new species in 2005 by the lichenologists Per Magnus Jørgensen and Dalip Kumar Upreti. The type specimen was collected in shola forest in the Nilgiri Mountains. It is named for its adnate (joined), feather-like incised squamules. Jørgensen transferred the taxon to the newly erected genus Vahliella in 2008.
