= Vahliella californica =

Scientific classification
- Kingdom: Fungi
- Division: Ascomycota
- Class: Lecanoromycetes
- Order: Peltigerales
- Family: Vahliellaceae
- Genus: Vahliella
- Species: V. californica

Binomial name
- Vahliella californica (Tuck.) P.M.Jørg. (2008)

Synonyms
- Pannaria microphylla f. californica Tuck. (1882); Parmeliella microphylla f. californica (Tuck.) Zahlbr. (1925); Fuscopannaria californica (Tuck.) P.M.Jørg. (2000)

Species of lichen

Vahliella californica is a species of squamulose lichen in the family Vahliellaceae. It was first described as new to science in 1882 by the American lichenologist Edward Tuckerman, who classified it as a form of the species Pannaria microphylla. He described it as a "coarser" form than the regular version, with wider spores. The type locality, California, is reflected in the species epithet. The Norwegian lichenologist Per Magnus Jørgensen promoted the taxon to species status in 2000. In 2008, he transferred it to the newly created genus Vahliella.
