= Fuscopannaria dispersa =

Scientific classification
- Domain: Eukaryota
- Kingdom: Fungi
- Division: Ascomycota
- Class: Lecanoromycetes
- Order: Peltigerales
- Family: Pannariaceae
- Genus: Fuscopannaria
- Species: F. dispersa

Binomial name
- Fuscopannaria dispersa P.M.Jørg. (2000)

Species of lichen

Fuscopannaria dispersa is a species of corticolous (bark-dwelling), squamulose lichen in the family Pannariaceae. It is found in China, where it grows on the bark of several tree species at an elevation range from 3,650 to 4,300 m (11,980 to 14,110 ft), close to the forest limit. It was formally described as a new species in 2000 by Norwegian lichenologist Per Magnus Jørgensen. The type specimen was collected by Joseph Rock from the eastern slopes of Likang Snow Range (Yangtze watershed, Yunnan) in 1922, and has since been documented in a few locations in eastern China. The lichen has a brown thallus made of small squamules (up to 2 mm in diameter) spread out over a distinct black prothallus. Its ascospores are ellipsoid, colourless, lack septa, and measure 15–17 by 9–10 μm. Fuscopannaria dispersa is similar to the more widespread F. leucosticta (the type species of genus Fuscopannaria), but can be distinguished from that species by the squamulose form of its thallus and by its smaller, rounder ascospores.
