= Fuscopannaria granulifera =

Scientific classification
- Domain: Eukaryota
- Kingdom: Fungi
- Division: Ascomycota
- Class: Lecanoromycetes
- Order: Peltigerales
- Family: Pannariaceae
- Genus: Fuscopannaria
- Species: F. granulifera

Binomial name
- Fuscopannaria granulifera P.M.Jørg. (2004)

Species of lichen

Fuscopannaria granulifera is a species of squamulose (scaley), corticolous (bark-dwelling) lichen in the family Pannariaceae. Found in India, it was formally described as a new species in 2004 by Norwegian lichenologist Per Magnus Jørgensen. The type specimen was collected from the Great Himalayan National Park (Himachal Pradesh) at an elevation of 3,140 m (10,300 ft). It is only known to occur in the upper forests of western Himalayas. F. granulifera is the only corticolous member of its genus that has a green algal photobiont; all others have a cyanobacterial photobiont.
