= Fuscopannaria obtegens =

Scientific classification
- Domain: Eukaryota
- Kingdom: Fungi
- Division: Ascomycota
- Class: Lecanoromycetes
- Order: Peltigerales
- Family: Pannariaceae
- Genus: Fuscopannaria
- Species: F. obtegens

Binomial name
- Fuscopannaria obtegens P.M.Jørg. (2007)

Species of lichen

Fuscopannaria obtegens is a species of corticolous (bark-dwelling), squamulose lichen in the family Pannariaceae. Found in China, it was formally described as a new species in 2007 by Norwegian lichenologist Per Magnus Jørgensen. The type specimen was collected from Nyingchi-Dongjuk (southeastern Tibet) at an elevation of 4,430 m (14,530 ft); there, on a south-facing slope, it was found growing on the stems of Juniper. It is only known to occur in the type locality. The widely spread thallus of the lichen is made of dichotomously branched, brown squamules up to 2 mm (0.08 in) in diameter. The squamules are imbricating, meaning they overlap each other; according to the author, they give the impression of a tiled roof reminiscent of stave churches in Norway.
