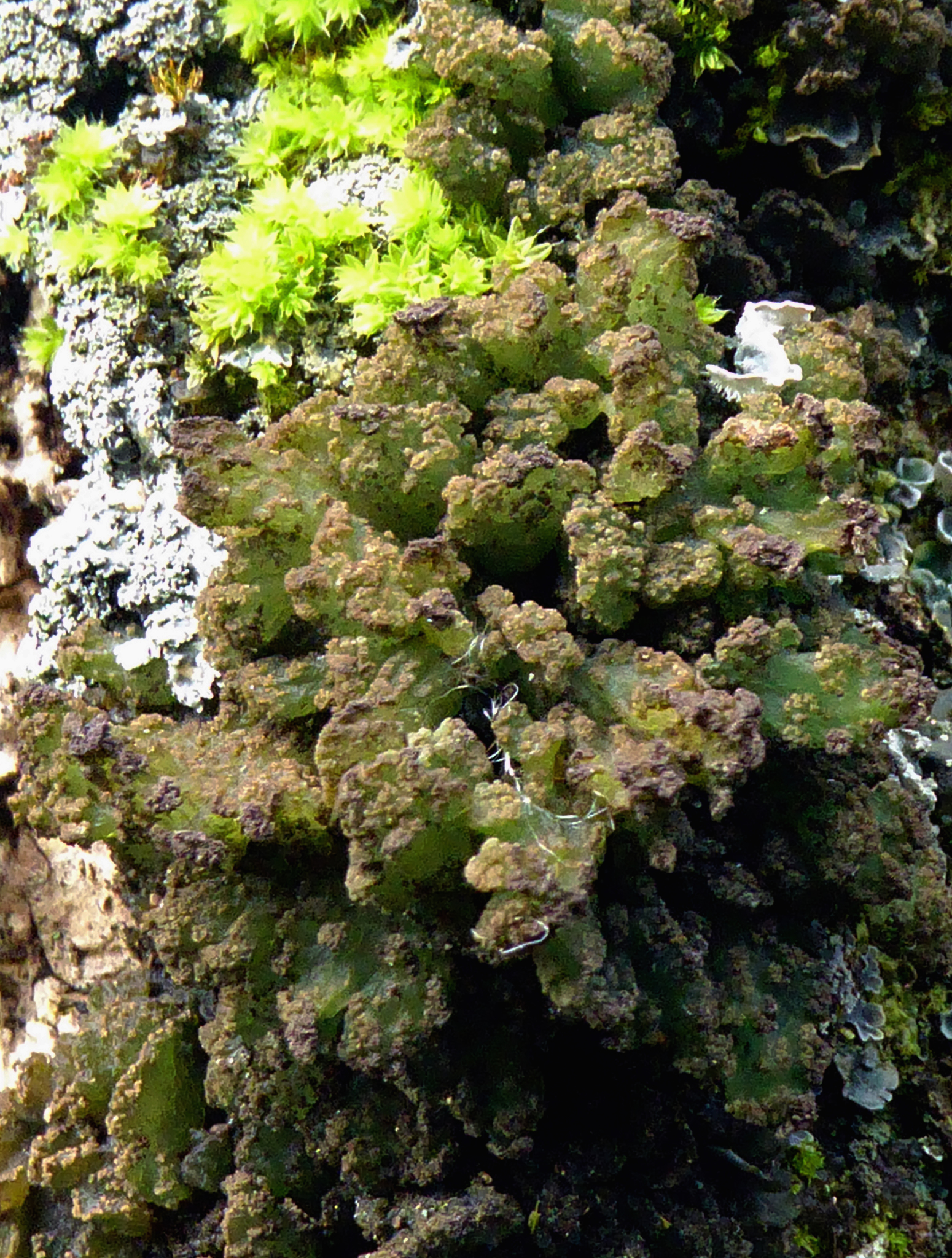
- Gabura fascicularis from New Zealand

Scientific classification
- Kingdom: Fungi
- Division: Ascomycota
- Class: Lecanoromycetes
- Order: Baeomycetales
- Family: Arctomiaceae
- Genus: Gabura; Adans. (1763)

Type species
- Gabura fascicularis (L.) P.M.Jørg. (2014)

Species
- G. borbonica G. fascicularis G. insignis

= Gabura =

Genus of lichens

Gabura is a small genus of lichen-forming fungi in the family Arctomiaceae. These lichens form low-growing patches that range from thin, crust-like films to small, crumpled cushions, appearing dark olive-green to almost black when dry but swelling like a sponge and becoming softer when wet. They partner with blue-green algae called Nostoc and grow on tree bark or soil, often among mosses, reproducing through tiny disc-shaped fruiting bodies that contain long, multi-celled ascospores.

== Taxonomy ==
Although it was originally circumscribed in 1763 by French botanist Michel Adanson, the name was nomen rejiciendum–it was "suppressed" against the conserved name Collema, and for a long time considered a synonym of Arctomia. In 2014, Per Magnus Jørgensen proposed to use the name Gabura for what was then known as Collema fasciculare. The name was formally resurrected for use in 2020. Gabura has three species transferred from the genus Arctomia following molecular phylogenetic analysis.

== Description ==
Gabura forms low-growing thalli that range from a thin, crust-like film firmly attached to the substrate to small, crumpled cushions whose margins break into indistinct lobes. When dry the surface is a dark olive-green to almost black; in many species it absorbs water like a sponge, swelling noticeably and taking on a softer texture. A true cortex—the protective outer skin seen in many lichens—is poorly developed or absent, so the underlying tissues show through. Some taxa produce powdery patches called soralia, whose yellow- to brown-tinged granules contain both partners of the lichen symbiosis and serve as ready-made propagules for dispersal.

Embedded among the fungal threads are clusters of the cyanobacterium Nostoc; its orangey-green cells, measuring 5–7 micrometres across, sit within a clear jelly that helps the thallus retain moisture. Sexual reproduction, where it occurs, takes place in minute disc-shaped fruit bodies (apothecia) that arise directly from the lobes and remain almost stalkless. These discs lack a distinct rim of thallus tissue and may be flat or gently domed. Inside, slender branched filaments (paraphyses) stand amongst the asci; their tips broaden and darken to brown. Each ascus is of the Trapelia type: it has a thickened apex (the tholus) that remains colourless in iodine, while the surrounding gelatinous sheath stains blue, and it normally contains eight long, spindle-shaped ascospores divided by multiple cross-walls (septa).

Asexual reproduction is achieved through flask-shaped pycnidia sunk in the thallus; these release tiny, rod-shaped conidia. Chemical screening with thin-layer chromatography has so far revealed no secondary metabolites, making the genus unreactive with standard chemical spot test. The combination of a swelling, dark thallus with optional soralia, cyanobacterial photobiont, Trapelia-type asci and multiseptate spores distinguishes Gabura from superficially similar gelatinous crusts in the same habitats.

== Habitat, distribution, and ecology ==
Species of Gabura have a scattered but wide distribution, spanning oceanic and humid temperate regions in both hemispheres. Gabura fascicularis is recorded from oceanic and sub-oceanic parts of Europe, with reports extending into North Africa and Asia, and it is also known from the Southern Hemisphere (including Australasia); in molecular sampling, collections identified as G. fascicularis fell into geographically disjunct European and Southern Hemisphere lineages. Gabura insignis is best known from the Pacific Northwest of North America and has confirmed occurrences in Ireland and Scotland, with additional reports from Ecuador and Japan; related early-diverging lineages occur in Madagascar, Réunion and South Africa, and much of the group's genetic diversity is centred in the south-western Indian Ocean. The third species, G. borbonica, is widespread on Réunion in the Mascarene Islands.

Across the genus, Gabura lichens are usually epiphytic on woody substrates such as bark, twigs and trunks, and they are most often recorded in persistently humid, shaded settings. In Europe, G. fascicularis occurs mainly on the bark of old broad-leaved trees such as elm (Ulmus) and ash (Fraxinus), sometimes over mosses on bark or rock and occasionally among mosses on calcareous rock outcrops; in Australasia it inhabits very wet, shaded microhabitats on the lower parts of trees in humid forests. In the Pacific Northwest, G. insignis grows on twigs of conifers, hardwoods and shrubs in coastal forests and has also been found on stabilised dunes and headlands; the type was collected near sea level (about 10 m elevation) on an alder (Alnus) trunk, while British Isles records are from trees in parkland settings. On Réunion, G. borbonica occurs in mountain forest and thicket habitats, including disturbed secondary thickets with Eucalyptus plantations, where it has been recorded on Eucalyptus and Acacia heterophylla trunks and on the main stems of Erica thickets. In Britain and Ireland, members of the genus have also been recorded growing on soil (terricolous) and amongst mosses.

Gabura species are cyanolichens with Nostoc as their photobiont, and differences in reproductive strategy have ecological consequences. Gabura fascicularis can produce apothecia on the thallus surface, whereas members of the G. insignis complex are sorediate and may lack known sexual fruiting bodies in parts of their range; European thalli can be minute (about 2–5 mm across) and easily overlooked in surveys. Gabura borbonica produces goniocysts at lobe margins that break down into a soredioid fringe. At least some species appear sensitive to the continuity and quality of their substrates: in Britain, G. fascicularis has declined alongside the loss of mature host trees and other pressures such as acid rain, and it is treated as near threatened there.

== Species ==
- Gabura borbonica (Magain & Sérus.) Magain & Sérus. (2020)
- Gabura fascicularis (L.) P.M.Jørg. (2014)
- Gabura insignis (P.M.Jørg. & Tønsberg) Magain & Sérus. (2020)
