= Fuscopannaria convexa =

Conservation status
- Unranked (NatureServe)

Scientific classification
- Kingdom: Fungi
- Division: Ascomycota
- Class: Lecanoromycetes
- Order: Peltigerales
- Family: Pannariaceae
- Genus: Fuscopannaria
- Species: F. convexa

Binomial name
- Fuscopannaria convexa P.M.Jørg. (2005)

Species of lichen-forming fungus

Fuscopannaria convexa is a species of lichen-forming fungus in the family Pannariaceae. It is a small, olive-brown, crust-forming lichen with distinctive strongly convex, blackish fruiting bodies, found growing on tree bark and occasionally rock in humid coastal habitats of southern Alaska. The species was described in 2005 and appears to be restricted to ocean-influenced sites along the south-coastal Alaska region.

== Taxonomy ==
Fuscopannaria convexa was described as a new species in 2005 by Per Magnus Jørgensen, based on material collected in hypermaritime (an extremely wet, mild coastal climate with strong maritime influence) southern Alaska. The type specimen was collected by Tor Tønsberg in 2001 near Cordova (Copper River Delta, Long Island, along the Copper River Highway), and is housed in the herbarium of the University of Bergen (BG), with an isotype (duplicate) in the University of Washington herbarium (WTU).

Jørgensen compared the species with the European Fuscopannaria ignobilis, which can look similar in having strongly convex apothecia, but F. convexa tends to be darker and contains atranorin. He also considered it closer to F. leucostictoides, from which it differs in its more crustose thallus, the absence of terpenoids, and its smaller, more strongly convex apothecia.

== Description ==
The thallus is crustose to squamulose, forming large, often circular colonies up to about 8 cm (3 in) across, sitting on a distinct blackish prothallus. The squamules are olive-brown on the upper surface, typically with paler margins. In cross section, the thallus is up to about 200 μm thick, with a paraplectenchymatous upper cortex about 15–20 μm thick.

Apothecia (fruiting bodies) are common and reach about 1 mm in diameter. They are strongly convex, with a blackish disc and an excluded thalline margin. Microscopically, the hymenium is about 100–150 μm high. The asci have an amyloid apical ring structure, and the ascospores measure 13–16(–18) × 7–10 μm. Pycnidia were not observed. In spot tests, the thallus is K+ (faint yellow), and thin-layer chromatography detects atranorin.

== Habitat and distribution ==
The species is currently known from only a few localities in hypermaritime southern Alaska. The type locality is described as unusually exposed, influenced directly by the open ocean. All known collections reported in the original paper came from very humid sites, where the lichen was found on trunks of Populus species at low elevations (about 20–30 m). Jørgensen suggested it may prove to be a local taxon restricted to these extreme, ocean-influenced habitats. Later records indicate that the species is more widespread along the south-coastal Alaska region than originally known. It has been reported from the Cordova area and the Copper River Delta (including the type locality on Long Island), as well as inland-to-coastal sites such as the Chilkoot Trail, Kenai Fjords National Park (including the Exit Glacier area and Verdant Cove), and Glacier Bay National Park and Preserve (East and West Arms, including the Gustavus area). It occurs mainly on bark (recorded on Alnus, Populus, and Picea), but it has also been found on exposed rock faces.
