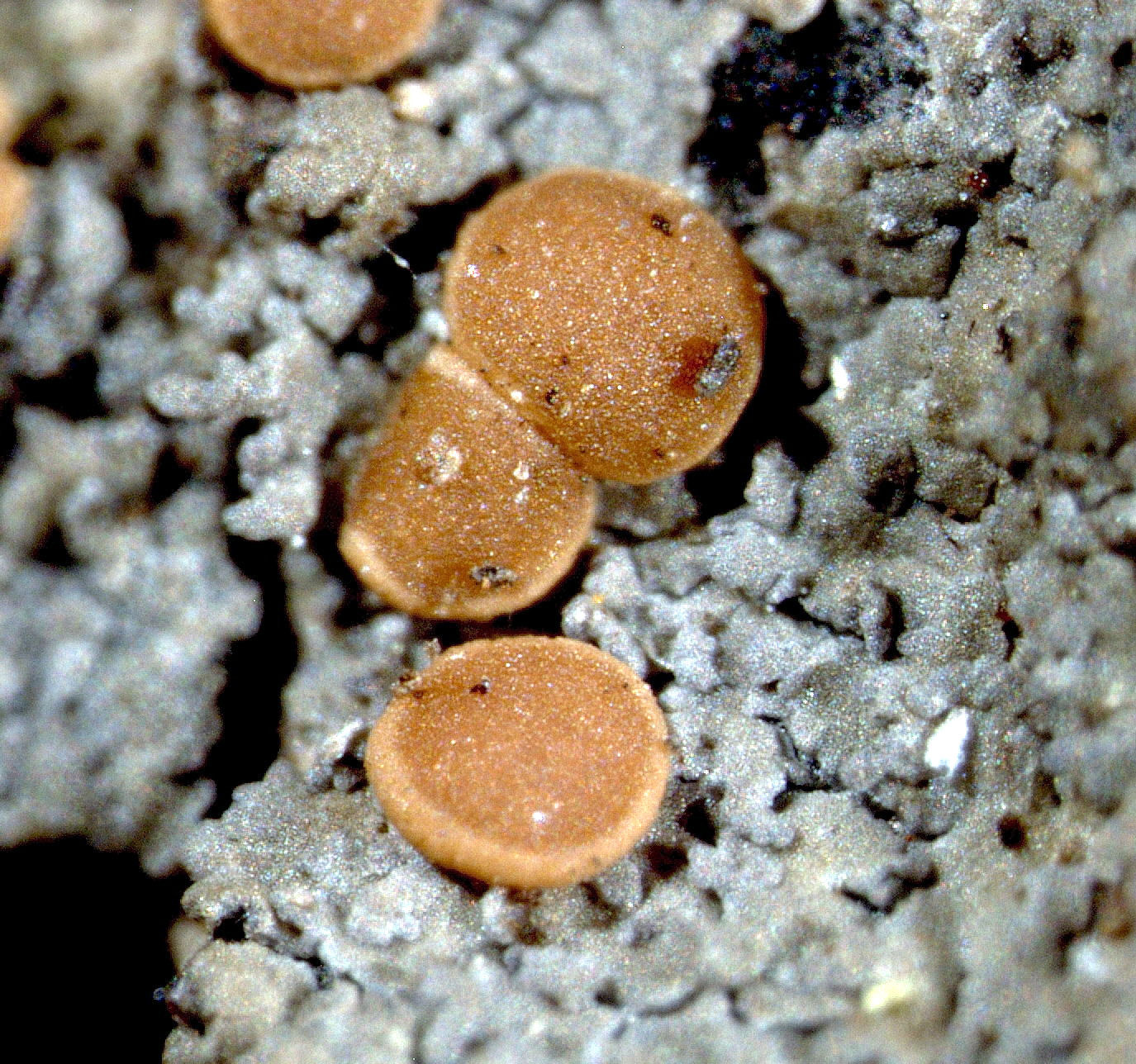
- fruiting bodies

Conservation status
- Apparently Secure (NatureServe)

Scientific classification
- Kingdom: Fungi
- Division: Ascomycota
- Class: Lecanoromycetes
- Order: Peltigerales
- Family: Vahliellaceae
- Genus: Vahliella
- Species: V. saubinetii

Binomial name
- Vahliella saubinetii (Mont.) P.M.Jørg. (2008)

Synonyms
- Parmelia saubinetii Mont. (1836); Pannaria saubinetii (Mont.) Nyl. (1854); Trachyderma saubinetii (Mont.) Trevis. (1869); Pannaria microphylla var. saubinetii (Mont.) Boistel (1903); Parmeliella saubinetii (Mont.) Zahlbr. (1909); Fuscopannaria saubinetii (Mont.) P.M.Jørg. (1994)

= Vahliella saubinetii =

Species of lichen-forming fungus

Vahliella saubinetii is a species of squamulose lichen in the family Vahliellaceae.

== Taxonomy ==
The species was scientifically described by Camille Montagne in 1836 as Parmelia (Psoroma) saubinetii. In his protologue he placed it near Psoroma within Parmelia (in the loose sense, or sensu lato), describing a thallus of overlapping, cartilage-like blue squamules with crenate-incised margins and a pale hypothallus. He stated that the apothecia arise from the hypothallus and are biatorine—bearing a thin, proper margin rather than a thalline one—with a flesh-coloured disc. Microscopically, Montagne noted hyaline, elliptical asci with granular contents, embedded in a hymenium with numerous paraphyses.

Per Magnus Jørgensen reclassified the species in the genus Vahliella in 2008.

== Description ==
Vahliella saubinetii forms a thin crust made up of tiny, scale-like lobes (squamules) that are bluish grey to grey-brown and lack any frost-like surface bloom (epruinose). The squamules have finely scalloped margins and are usually 0.2–0.3 mm across, though they occasionally reach 0.5 mm or shrink to as little as 0.1 mm. Internally, the thallus is heteromerous (built in distinct layers): a brickwork-like upper cortex(paraplectenchyma), a loose white medulla that grades into anchoring hyphae (rhizohyphae), and no lower cortex. The photosynthetic partner (photobiont) is a cyanobacterium of the genus Nostoc, with cells clustered in packets.

Sexual fruiting bodies (apothecia) are common, 0.3–1.2 mm wide, and sit directly on the thallus surface (sessile). The disc is flat to slightly convex and pale brown-orange to pink-brown, bordered by a paler, persistent rim of fungal tissue (a thin proper margin). Microscopically, the surface film over the disc (epithecium) is brownish, while the spore-bearing layer (hymenium) is colourless to pale yellow-brown and stains blue with iodine (I+). The simple paraphyses (sterile filaments among the spore sacs) are about 2 μm thick and broaden to club-shaped tips. Beneath the hymenium, the supporting tissue (hypothecium) is colourless.

The asci (spore sacs) are club-shaped to nearly cylindrical, each containing eight ascospores. They show iodine-positive layers on both the inner tip (a thin, dense amyloid cap on the endoascus) and the outer wall (amyloid exoascus), but no other dense amyloid structures. The ascospores are single-celled, colourless, and ellipsoid with rounded ends, lacking a distinct outer epispore, and measure 12–17 × 4–6 μm. Standard spot tests are negative throughout (K−, C−, KC−, P−, UV−), and no lichen substances have been detected.
