= Arctomia teretiuscula =

Scientific classification
- Kingdom: Fungi
- Division: Ascomycota
- Class: Lecanoromycetes
- Order: Baeomycetales
- Family: Arctomiaceae
- Genus: Arctomia
- Species: A. teretiuscula

Binomial name
- Arctomia teretiuscula P.M.Jørg. (2003)

Species of lichen-forming fungus

Arctomia teretiuscula is a rare species of squamulose (scaly) lichen in the family Arctomiaceae. It is found at high elevations in the mountains between Tibet and Sichuan, China.

== Taxonomy ==
The lichen was formally described as a new species in 2003 by Norwegian lichenologist Per Magnus Jørgensen. The type specimen was collected by Walter Obermayer in Hailuogou glacier and forest park (Mount Gongga) at an elevation between 2,980 and 3,150 m (9,780 and 10,330 ft). Here it was found growing on mossy rocks and soil. Due to its small size and undistinguished colour, it is readily missed in the field. Although at the time of publication the lichen was only known to occur at the type locality, Jørgensen speculated that it might have a wider distribution in similar habitats in the Himalayas.

In a 2025 multilocus study of Arctomia, the holotype of A. teretiuscula was sequenced and recovered as a distinct, well-supported lineage within the genus. The study also reported that the species is still known only from its type locality.

== Description ==
The lichen forms dark brown squamulose rosettes up to 1 cm (0.4 in) in diameter. Its thallus is coral-like in form, composed of densely packed branchlets up to about 2 mm tall that arise from a compact squamulose base, with a multilayer cortex and a layer of cyanobionts. Small apothecia are scattered on the tips and sides of the branchlets and are usually about 0.2–0.9 mm wide.

Its ascospores, which number eight per ascus, are spindle-shaped (fusiform) and often curved, divided by 6 to 8 (usually 7) septa, and measure about 40–60 by 4–5 μm. No secondary chemicals were detected with the use of thin-layer chromatography, and all of the standard chemical spot tests are negative.

Arctomia teretiuscula is similar in appearance to Arctomia delicatula—the type species of genus Arctomia—found in western and northern Europe. The main visible difference between the two is the coralloid thallus of A. teretiuscula compared to the granular thallus of its European counterpart. Other anatomical differences between the two become apparent when their internal microscopic structures are compared.
