= Fuscopannaria saltuensis =

Scientific classification
- Domain: Eukaryota
- Kingdom: Fungi
- Division: Ascomycota
- Class: Lecanoromycetes
- Order: Peltigerales
- Family: Pannariaceae
- Genus: Fuscopannaria
- Species: F. saltuensis

Binomial name
- Fuscopannaria saltuensis P.M.Jørg. (2000)

Species of lichen

Fuscopannaria saltuensis is a species of ground-dwelling, squamulose lichen in the family Pannariaceae. It is found in both the Eastern and Western Himalayas, where it grows on soil in open mountain forests with pastures and cliffs.

== Taxonomy ==
The lichen was formally described as a new species in 2000 by Norwegian lichenologist Per Magnus Jørgensen. The type specimen was collected from a south-facing slope in the Shaluli Mountains (Sichuan) at an altitude of 4,000–4,150 m (13,120–13,620 ft). Oaks, junipers, and spruces were the dominant plant species in this location.

Fuscopannaria saltuensis is a member of the F. praetermissa species complex. It differs from this species in its brown coloured thallus, its abundant small apothecia, and its smaller, roughly spherical spores.

== Description ==
The lichen has a light brown thallus comprising thick, incised, and overlapping squamules up to 3 mm in diameter; the thallus forms a pad or cushion up to 3 cm (1.2 in) in diameter. It produces abundant apothecia, which are up to 1 mm in diameter, with a convex shape and lacking a thalline margin. Its ascospores are more or less spherical, colourless, and measure 12–14 by 8–9 μm.

== Habitat and distribution ==
Fuscopannaria saltuensis thrives in the environment of open mountain forests that typically have pastures and cliffs. Its species epithet saltuensis refers to this particular habitat preference. The lichen has also been found to occasionally grow on the bases of trees and bushes. Furthermore, it can also be found in mountain pastures where it is able to survive and grow. It has been recorded in Tibet, Sichuan, and Himachal Pradesh.
