= Fuscopannaria hirsuta =

Scientific classification
- Domain: Eukaryota
- Kingdom: Fungi
- Division: Ascomycota
- Class: Lecanoromycetes
- Order: Peltigerales
- Family: Pannariaceae
- Genus: Fuscopannaria
- Species: F. hirsuta

Binomial name
- Fuscopannaria hirsuta P.M.Jørg. (2004)

Species of lichen

Fuscopannaria hirsuta is a species of squamulose (scaley), corticolous (bark-dwelling) lichen in the family Pannariaceae. Found in China, it was formally described as a new species in 2004 by Norwegian lichenologist Per Magnus Jørgensen. The type specimen was collected from the Nyenchen Tanglha Mountains in Tibet at an elevation of 2,500 m (8,200 ft), where it was found growing on Salix bark. It has also been recorded growing on Juniperus bark. The species epithet hirsuta refers to the hairy upper thallus surface, the first in genus Fuscopannaria with this characteristic.
