= Fuscopannaria albomaculata =

Scientific classification
- Domain: Eukaryota
- Kingdom: Fungi
- Division: Ascomycota
- Class: Lecanoromycetes
- Order: Peltigerales
- Family: Pannariaceae
- Genus: Fuscopannaria
- Species: F. albomaculata

Binomial name
- Fuscopannaria albomaculata P.M.Jørg. (2004)

Species of lichen

Fuscopannaria albomaculata is a species of squamulose (scaley), corticolous (bark-dwelling) lichen in the family Pannariaceae. Found in China, it was formally described as a new species in 2004 by Norwegian lichenologist Per Magnus Jørgensen. The type specimen was collected from Hailuogou Glacier Forest Park (Luding County, Garzê Tibetan Autonomous Prefecture, Sichuan) at an elevation between 2,940 and 3,130 m (9,650 and 10,270 ft). The lichen grows on deciduous trees, especially birch and willow, in mountainous forests near glaciers, at elevations between 3,000 and 4,000 m (9,800 and 13,100 ft). It is distinguished from other members of genus Fuscopannaria by the white spots on its thallus.
