= Fuscopannaria dillmaniae =

Scientific classification
- Domain: Eukaryota
- Kingdom: Fungi
- Division: Ascomycota
- Class: Lecanoromycetes
- Order: Peltigerales
- Family: Pannariaceae
- Genus: Fuscopannaria
- Species: F. dillmaniae

Binomial name
- Fuscopannaria dillmaniae T.Sprib. (2020)

Species of lichen

Fuscopannaria dillmaniae is a species of lichen in the family Pannariaceae. Found in Alaska, it was described as a new species in 2020 by lichenologist Toby Spribille.

== Taxonomy ==
The type specimen was collected in the Hoonah-Angoon Census Area, just outside the boundaries of Glacier Bay National Park, northwest of Gustavus. Here the lichen was discovered growing on the bark of Alnus viridis subsp. crispa. The specific epithet dillmaniae honors Karen Dillman, an ecologist with the United States Forest Service, for her "outstanding contributions ... in documenting the lichen biota of south-east Alaska".

== Description ==
The thallus of the lichen comprises olivaceous-brown, corticate, isidioid granules measuring 20–50 μm in diameter. The granules rest on a black hypothallus that contains Nostoc-like cyanobacterial cells tightly packed with fungal hyphae, and sheathed in a gelatinous cortex-like layer. The ascomata are in the form of an apothecium; they are round with a diameter of 0.4–0.9 mm and have a flat to convex reddish-brown to dark reddish-brown disc. The ascospores are simple, broadly ellipsoid in shape, and typically measure about 16 by 8.0–9.5 μm. The lichen does not make any positive reactions with standard lichen spot tests, and no lichen substances were detected using thin-layer chromatography.

== Habitat and distribution ==
Only it has only been recorded a few times from southeast Alaska, where it grows on the bark of Alnus and Populus in lowland temperate rainforests, the authors suggest that Fuscopannaria dillmaniae is more widespread in south-east Alaska than the sparse records suggest.
