= Fuscopannaria dissecta =

Scientific classification
- Domain: Eukaryota
- Kingdom: Fungi
- Division: Ascomycota
- Class: Lecanoromycetes
- Order: Peltigerales
- Family: Pannariaceae
- Genus: Fuscopannaria
- Species: F. dissecta

Binomial name
- Fuscopannaria dissecta P.M.Jørg. (2000)

Species of lichen

Fuscopannaria dissecta is a species of corticolous (bark-dwelling), squamulose lichen in the family Pannariaceae. Found in Japan, it was formally described as a new species in 2000 by Norwegian lichenologist Per Magnus Jørgensen. The type specimen was collected by Syo Kurokawa from Mount Kōya (Wakayama Prefecture, Honshu) at an altitude of 800 m (2,600 ft); there it was found growing on the rotting bark of trees. The lichen has a pale brown thallus that forms irregular patches comprising squamules that about are about 2 mm wide. The squamules are dissected–cut deeply into fine lobes–and it is this character that is referenced in the species epithet dissecta.
