= Fuscopannaria siamensis =

Scientific classification
- Domain: Eukaryota
- Kingdom: Fungi
- Division: Ascomycota
- Class: Lecanoromycetes
- Order: Peltigerales
- Family: Pannariaceae
- Genus: Fuscopannaria
- Species: F. siamensis

Binomial name
- Fuscopannaria siamensis P.M.Jørg. (2000)

Species of lichen

Fuscopannaria siamensis is a species of lichen in the family Pannariaceae. It is found in the mountainous forests of northern Thailand and in Tamil Nadu, India, where it grows in humid habitats in association with mosses.

== Taxonomy ==
The lichen was formally described as a new species in 2000 by lichenologists Per Magnus Jørgensen and Pat Wolseley. The type specimen was collected by the authors from Doi Inthanon (Chiang Mai) at an altitude of 2,450 m (8,040 ft); there, on a roadside near the summit, the lichen was found growing amongst bryophytes that had fallen from the canopy.

== Description ==
The lichen has a squamulose to foliose thallus, brown to reddish-brown in colour, that forms patches up to 5 cm (2 in) in diameter. The marginal lobes are about 2 mm wide, and up to about 150 μm thick. Towards the tip, the lobes produce smaller lobules that break down somewhat to resemble soralia; this may be an adaptation to the wet growth conditions in its environment. Apothecia are rare in this species; if present, they are up to 1.5 mm in diameter and have a dark brown disc and a thalline margin with a squamulose form. The ascospores are colourless, lack septa, are more or less ellipsoid, and measure 18–20 by 9–10 mm.

== Habitat and distribution ==
Fuscopannaria siamensis is muscicolous (associating with mosses), and occurs in moist forests and the light-exposed edges of evergreen savannahs. It has been recorded at elevation ranges from 2,000 to 2,500 m (6,600 to 8,200 ft) in the mountains of northern Thailand. The lichen was later reported from Tamil Nadu, India, at an elevation of 2,600 m (8,500 ft). In contrast to the original type material, the Indian material did not have lobes that eroded into soralia-like areas; the author suggested that perhaps this the "normal" form of the lichen, rather than the species "which therefore unfortunately appears to have been described on an extreme form". Jørgensen suggests the lichen may have a wider subtropical distribution.
