= Fuscopannaria rugosa =

Scientific classification
- Domain: Eukaryota
- Kingdom: Fungi
- Division: Ascomycota
- Class: Lecanoromycetes
- Order: Peltigerales
- Family: Pannariaceae
- Genus: Fuscopannaria
- Species: F. rugosa

Binomial name
- Fuscopannaria rugosa H.J.Liu & J.S.Hu (2016)

Species of lichen

Fuscopannaria rugosa is a species of corticolous (bark-dwelling), lichen in the family Pannariaceae. It is found in Hubei and Guanxi in China, where it grows in mountainous forests. Fuscopannaria rugosa is identifiable by its foliose-squamulose thallus, which has longitudinal wrinkles on the upper surface. It also has a distinct hypothallus, a relatively thick algal layer, and a cortex made up of thick-walled cells in both the thalline and apothecial structures. It produces simple, hyaline ascospores that have a smooth, pointed tip (epispore) at their apex.

== Taxonomy ==
The lichen was formally described as a new species in 2013 by Hua-Jie Liu and Jian-sen Hu. The type specimen was collected from Mt. Shennongjia (Hubei Province) at an altitude of 2,540 m (8,330 ft), where it was found growing on bark. The species epithet rugosa alludes to its wrinkled upper surface.

== Description ==
Fuscopannaria rugosa forms circular clusters with fan-shaped lobes that are up to 4–5 cm (1.6–2.0 in) in diameter. The lobes are brown or dark olive-green on the upper surface, and the lower surface varies from pale near the margin to dark brown or black towards the center. The lichen has no distinct rhizines or tomenta observed, and the hypothallus can be dark brown to black and protruding or not. Apothecia, which are circular structures, are abundant and can be up to 1–2.5 mm in diameter. They are red-brown to paler, shiny, and highly convex when mature.

The lichen has a distinct upper cortex that is 20–40 μm thick and cells that are thick-walled. The algal layer, which measures 200–300 μm, is embedded in a gelatinous layer and contains Nostoc cells in chains that appear blue under 10× magnification. The medulla is thin, white near the lobe margin, and blackened towards the centre. The lower cortex is absent.

All standard chemical spot tests are negative. Terpenoids and fatty acids occur in the lichen; these substances are detectable with thin-layer chromatography.
