= Wawea =

Scientific classification
- Domain: Eukaryota
- Kingdom: Fungi
- Division: Ascomycota
- Class: Lecanoromycetes
- Order: Baeomycetales
- Family: Arctomiaceae
- Genus: Wawea; Henssen & Kantvilas

Type species
- Wawea fruticulosa Henssen & Kantvilas

Genus of fungi

Wawea is a genus of lichenized fungi within the Arctomiaceae family. This is a monotypic genus, containing the single species Wawea fruticulosa.
