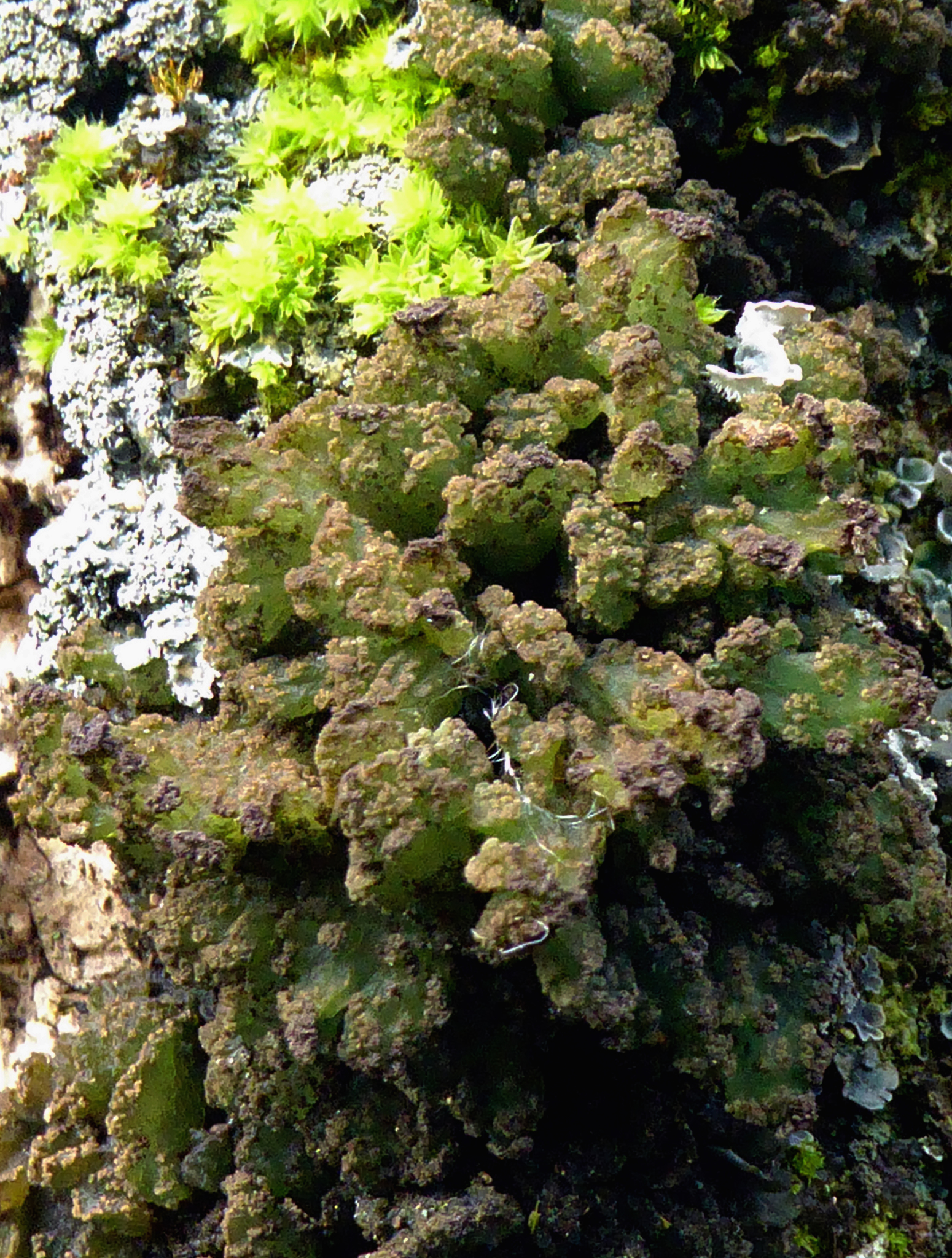
- Gabura fascicularis in New Zealand

Scientific classification
- Kingdom: Fungi
- Division: Ascomycota
- Class: Lecanoromycetes
- Order: Baeomycetales
- Family: Arctomiaceae; Th.Fr. (1861)

Type genus
- Arctomia Th.Fr. (1861)

Genera
- Arctomia; Gabura; Gregorella; Steinera; Wawea

= Arctomiaceae =

Family of lichen-forming fungi

The Arctomiaceae are a family of lichen-forming fungi in the Ascomycota, class Baeomycetales. The family was named by Theodor Magnus Fries in 1861, with Arctomia as the type genus. Species in this family are found in arctic and subarctic habitats, usually associated with bryophytes. In overall morphology, the Arctomiaceae combine features that are otherwise uncommon together within the Ostropomycetidae: a consistent association with cyanobacterial genus Nostoc, gelatinous thalli, and fruiting bodies that develop openly rather than being enclosed.

== Classification ==
The order Arctomiales was proposed by Soili Stenroos, Jolanta Miadlikowska, and François Lutzoni in 2014 to contain this family. In 2018, the class Lecanoromycetes was revised using a temporal approach that uses time-calibrated chronograms to define temporal bands for comparable ranks for orders and families. In this work, the orders Arctomiales, Hymeneliales, and Trapeliales were synonymized with Baeomycetales. In a subsequent review of the use of this method for biological classification of lichens, Robert Lücking considered this merge justified. This synonymy was also accepted in later compilations of fungal classification, and Arctomiaceae is classified in the order Baeomycetales.

== Description ==
Members of the Arctomiaceae are lichen-forming fungi that produce small to moderately developed thalli, which are typically crustose to weakly fruticose and often gelatinous when wet. The thallus is usually closely attached to the substrate and is most often bryophilous, growing directly on mosses or among bryophyte mats. In many species the thallus has a soft, somewhat translucent appearance when hydrated, reflecting its cyanobacterial symbiosis, while in dry conditions it becomes darker, firmer, and more compact. Unlike many other lichen families in the Ostropomycetidae, the Arctomiaceae consistently associate with cyanobacteria of the genus Nostoc as their primary photobiont, a feature that strongly influences both thallus texture and ecology.

The reproductive structures are apothecia that develop in a gymnocarpous manner, meaning that the disc becomes exposed early in development rather than remaining enclosed. Apothecia are usually small, often dark, and may appear partially immersed or only weakly differentiated from the surrounding thallus. The exciple is frequently thin or poorly developed. Asci are cylindrical and contain eight ascospores; they show a well-developed apical cap and an amyloid reaction in the ascus wall, a character that aligns the family with other lichenized members of the Lecanoromycetes while still setting it apart by details of ascus structure. Ascospores are hyaline, elongated, and transversely septate, commonly tapering toward the ends, giving them a slightly needle-like outline under the microscope.

== Genera ==
- Arctomia Th.Fr. (1861) – 4 spp.
- Gabura Adans. (1763) – 3 spp.
- Gregorella Lumbsch (2005) – 1 sp.
- Steinera Zahlbr. (1906) – 12 spp.
- Wawea Henssen & Kantvilas (1985) – 1 sp.

Genus Gabura was resurrected for use in 2020 and contains three species formerly placed in Arctomia.
