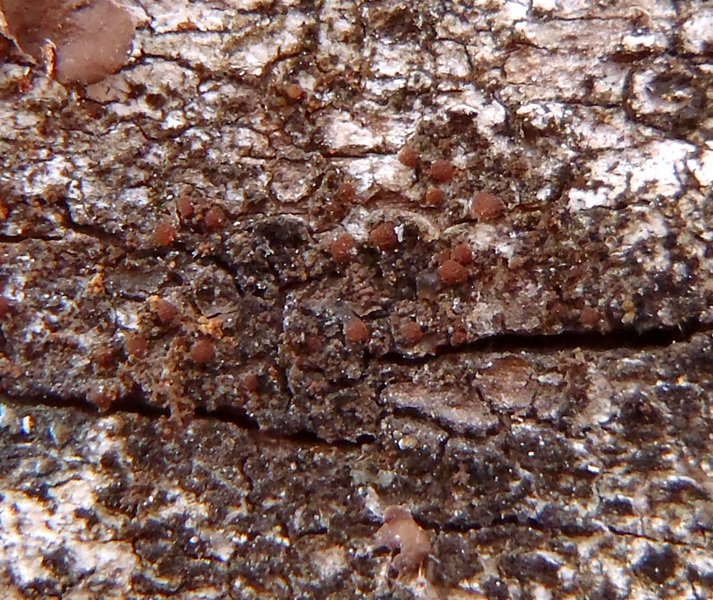
- Arctomia delicatula

Scientific classification
- Kingdom: Fungi
- Division: Ascomycota
- Class: Lecanoromycetes
- Order: Baeomycetales
- Family: Arctomiaceae
- Genus: Arctomia; Th.Fr. (1861)

Type species
- Arctomia delicatula Th.Fr. (1861)

Species
- A. delicatula A. interfixa A. papuanorum A. teretiuscula A. uviformis

= Arctomia =

Genus of lichen-forming fungi

Arctomia is a genus of lichen-forming fungi in the family Arctomiaceae. The genus was established in 1860 by the Swedish lichenologist Theodor Magnus Fries, and species of Arctomia are mainly distributed in circumpolar regions of the Northern Hemisphere. A comprehensive molecular study published in 2025 confirmed that the genus forms a distinct evolutionary lineage within its family. Species typically grow as thin, reddish-brown to blackish crusts on plant debris, mosses, or tree bark in cold northern regions, with their distribution ranging from the Arctic tundra to boreal forests and alpine heaths. The thallus contains cyanobacteria of the genus Nostoc as the photosynthetic partner, giving the lichen a slightly glossy, gelatinous texture when wet. Most species produce minute disc-shaped fruiting bodies containing elongated, many-celled ascospores.

== Taxonomy ==
The genus Arctomia was introduced by Theodor Magnus Fries in 1860 with A. delicatula as the sole species. In the protologue he characterised A. delicatula as a minute but strikingly beautiful crustose lichen, with a thin, verrucose, brownish thallus made up of tiny convex granules and relatively large, immarginate apothecia that become slightly gelatinous and wine-red when moist, growing over mosses in rather dry peatlands on Silurian substrates near Tromsø, Mortensnes and Nesseby in Finnmark, with additional material from Hornsund in Spitsbergen (Svalbard). Later authors expanded the genus by transferring Nylander's Pannaria acutior and Pannularia interfixa, and by adding further taxa such as the South African species A. muscicola and several members of the former Collema fasciculare group. A revision by Aino Henssen in 1969 took a narrower view and recognised only A. delicatula and A. interfixa, treating A. acutior as a bark-dwelling variety of A. delicatula distinguished mainly by slightly narrower ascospores.

A multilocus phylogenetic study published in 2025 analysed sequence data from various genetic markers for Arctomia and related genera in the Arctomiaceae, together with coalescent-based species delimitation methods. The authors found that Arctomia forms a strongly supported monophyletic group that also includes A. interfixa, and that this clade is sister to Gabura within the family. Earlier placements of A. interfixa outside Arctomia were attributed to a misidentified sequence that had been used in previous analyses.

Within the traditional concept of A. delicatula the study recovered several well-supported lineages. Using a combination of Bayesian species delimitation and probabilistic classification of morphological measurements, it recognised three species in this complex: A. delicatula in a stricter sense, A. acutior (raised from varietal rank) and a newly described species, A. confusa. Arctomia acutior differs from the other two in having smaller apothecia, narrower ascospores and a preference for bark substrates, whereas A. confusa is most similar to A. delicatula but has slightly narrower ascospores and a broader ecological range, occurring on both bark and plant detritus on soil.

The same study used supervised machine learning models trained on ascospore size, septation and apothecium width from sequenced specimens to classify unsequenced collections, including lectotypes, to species with very high posterior probabilities, providing an independent check on the DNA-based species limits.

== Description ==
Arctomia grows as a thin crust that can look either granular or like a miniature patchwork of tiny leaf-like scales. When dry, the surface is reddish-brown to nearly black and, unlike some gelatinous lichens, it does not swell appreciably after rain. In most species, the thallus forms a low crust of fine granules or tiny scales, although A. teretiuscula produces short, erect, isidia-like branchlets up to about 2 mm tall that give the colony a small, fruticulose appearance. The edge of a colony is indefinite and may develop small lobes, but the whole thallus remains low-lying. A single-cell-thick cortex—essentially a skin of brown fungal cells—covers the surface, and the lichen never produces the powdery outgrowths (isidia) or soralia seen in many other genera. Sandwiched between the fungal threads are clusters of cyanobacteria of the genus Nostoc; its cells, about 5–7 micrometres (μm) across, sit in a clear jelly that gives the thallus a slightly glossy, rubbery feel when moist.

Sexual reproduction takes place in minute disc-shaped fruiting bodies (apothecia) that originate as tiny bumps inside the lobes and become more or less stalkless on maturity. These discs are flat to gently domed and merge smoothly with the surrounding thallus rather than being ringed by a distinct margin. Inside, slender branched filaments (paraphyses) stand among the spore sacs; their tips broaden slightly and carry a brown pigment. Each ascus belongs to the Trapelia-type: it shows a thickened apex (the tholus) that stays colourless in iodine staining, while the surrounding gelatinous sheath stains blue, and it usually contains eight ascospores. The spores themselves are long, spindle-shaped and divided by many cross-walls (septa)—features that help them survive dispersal. Asexual reproduction occurs in embedded pycnidia that release tiny, rod-shaped conidia, and standard chemical spot tests detect no secondary metabolites in the thallus.

== Habitat and distribution ==
The genus is centred in cool, humid environments. Arctomia acutior and A. confusa occur mainly in hemiboreal and boreal forests of Fennoscandia and north-west Russia, often on bark of willows, rowans and spruces along streams and in swampy woodland, and both have also been recorded from Alaska. Arctomia delicatula s.str. is restricted to plant detritus on calcareous soils in exposed alpine heaths in Norway and Sweden, A. interfixa is a rare Arctic species of calcareous tundra from northern Fennoscandia, Arctic Russia and Alaska, and A. teretiuscula is known only from its type locality on mossy rocks and soil in the Hengduan Mountains of Sichuan, China.

== Species ==
Molecular and morphological work since the early 2000s has restricted Arctomia to a small group of cyanobacterial lichens within the Arctomiaceae. A 2025 multilocus study of the genus recognised five species in Arctomia sensu stricto: A. acutior, A. confusa, A. delicatula, A. interfixa and A. teretiuscula. As of November 2025, Species Fungorum (as used in the Catalogue of Life) lists eight species names under Arctomia:

- Arctomia borbonica Magain & Sérus. (2012)
- Arctomia delicatula Th.Fr. (1861)
- Arctomia fascicularis (L.) Otálora & Wedin (2013)
- Arctomia insignis (P.M.Jørg. & Tønsberg) Ertz (2017)
- Arctomia interfixa Nyl. ex Vain. (1909)
- Arctomia papuanorum (Degel.) Otálora & Wedin (2013)
- Arctomia teretiuscula P.M.Jørg. (2003) – China
- Arctomia uviformis (Hue) Otálora & Wedin (2013)

Several of the names still listed under Arctomia in these databases correspond to taxa that recent revisions place in other genera. Earlier authors also included species of the former Collema fasciculare group in Arctomia, but these have since been reassigned to other genera: several Antarctic and subantarctic species now belong in Steinera, three temperate species (including A. borbonica, A. fascicularis and A. insignis) are placed in Gabura, and others have been transferred to Hondaria in the Collemataceae.

The 2025 study resurrected Arctomia acutior from synonymy with A. delicatula and described A. confusa as new, based on phylogenetic analyses and subtle but consistent differences in ascospore width, apothecium size and substrate preferences. It also treated A. interfixa as a distinct species nested within Arctomia, in contrast to some earlier molecular work that had placed it as an isolated lineage within the Arctomiaceae.

Two tropical species, A. papuanorum and A. uviformis, have been suggested on morphological grounds to belong instead to the genus Hondaria (Collemataceae), and are not treated as members of Arctomia sensu stricto in recent phylogenetic work.
