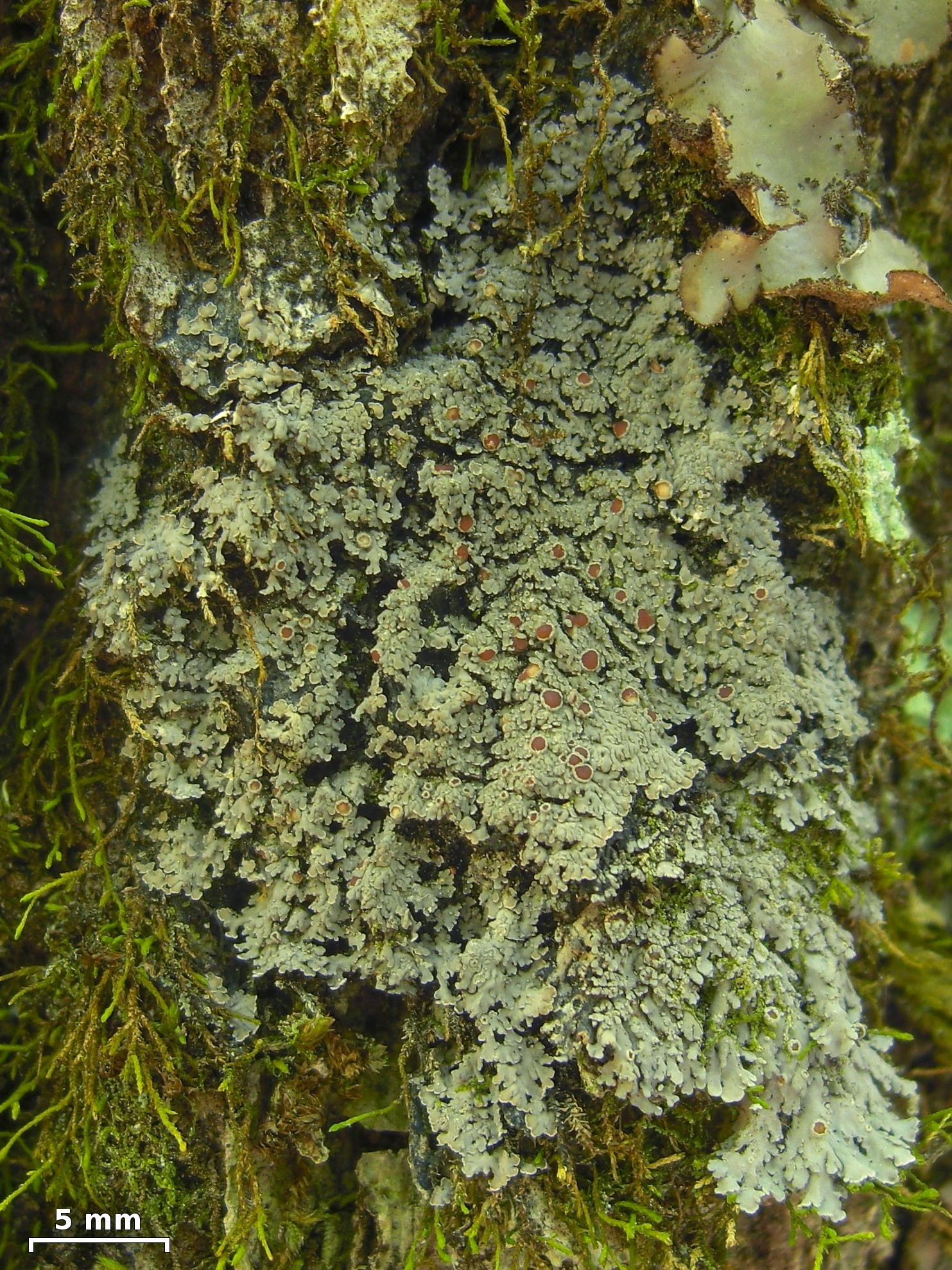
- Fuscopannaria leucosticta

Scientific classification
- Kingdom: Fungi
- Division: Ascomycota
- Class: Lecanoromycetes
- Order: Peltigerales
- Family: Pannariaceae
- Genus: Fuscopannaria; P.M.Jørg. (1994)

Type species
- Fuscopannaria leucosticta (Tuck.) P.M.Jørg. (1994)

Synonyms
- Fuscopannaria P.M.Jørg. (1993); Moelleropsis Gyeln. (1939); Moelleropsis Gyeln. (1940)

= Fuscopannaria =

Genus of lichens

Fuscopannaria is a genus of lichen-forming fungi in the family Pannariaceae. It has about 50 species. The genus was established in 1994 by the Norwegian lichenologist Per Magnus Jørgensen to accommodate a group of squamulose and crustose lichens that are widespread across temperate and tropical regions. Members of the genus are typically found on tree bark in moist, shaded habitats, ranging from tropical rainforests to temperate woodlands, where they appear as small, greyish or dark crusty or scaly patches on trunks and branches.

== Taxonomy ==
The genus was circumscribed by Norwegian lichenologist Per Magnus Jørgensen in 1994, with Fuscopannaria leucosticta assigned as the type species. Jørgensen had proposed the genus a year earlier, but the genus was not validly published at that time.

Moelleropsis is a genus that was published by Vilmos Kőfaragó-Gyelnik in 1940, with Moelleropsis nebulosa assigned as its type species. Using molecular phylogenetics, it was later shown that this taxon was nested within Fuscopannaria. Because Moelleropsis was published earlier than Fuscopannaria, the botanical rules for nomenclature indicated that Fuscopannaria be folded into synonymy with Moelleropsis. However, this would have meant that several dozen species would have had to change their names, so, in order to preserve "nomenclatural stability", in 2013 Jørgensen and colleagues proposed to conserve the name Fuscopannaria against Moelleropsis. This proposal was accepted by the Nomenclature Committee for Fungi in 2017.

A further nomenclatural issue concerned the older generic name Hueella (proposed by Zahlbruckner in 1926), based on the single species H. fauriei. After re-examining better material from the original collection, Jørgensen concluded that H. fauriei is merely a form of Fuscopannaria leucophaea (now Vahliella leucophaea), with spores that only seem to be septate because of internal oil droplets rather than true cross-walls, so Hueella does not represent a distinct genus at all. Because Hueella predates Fuscopannaria, allowing it to stand would have forced the replacement of a widely used generic name and required numerous new combinations, even though Hueella was poorly described, had been based on a doubtful, weakly developed specimen, and had seen almost no use in the literature; Jørgensen therefore proposed that Hueella be formally rejected to maintain nomenclatural stability, and this proposal was later followed in work establishing the separate genus Vahliella for the lineage formerly treated as Fuscopannaria subgenus Micropannaria. Jørgensen's 2000 proposal was recommended by the Nomenclature Committee for Fungi, approved by the General Committee, and implemented in the Code as a rejected name.

== Description ==
Fuscopannaria lichens have a squamulose (scaly) or crustose (crust-like) growth form. The lower surface is often attached to the substrate by a dark blue to blue-black hypothallus, a mat of fungal filaments that may be visible between the individual scales of the thallus. The upper surface varies in colour, ranging from bluish-grey to olive or nearly black. Unlike many lichens, Fuscopannaria lacks a distinct lower cortex, while its upper cortex is composed of thick-walled fungal cells.

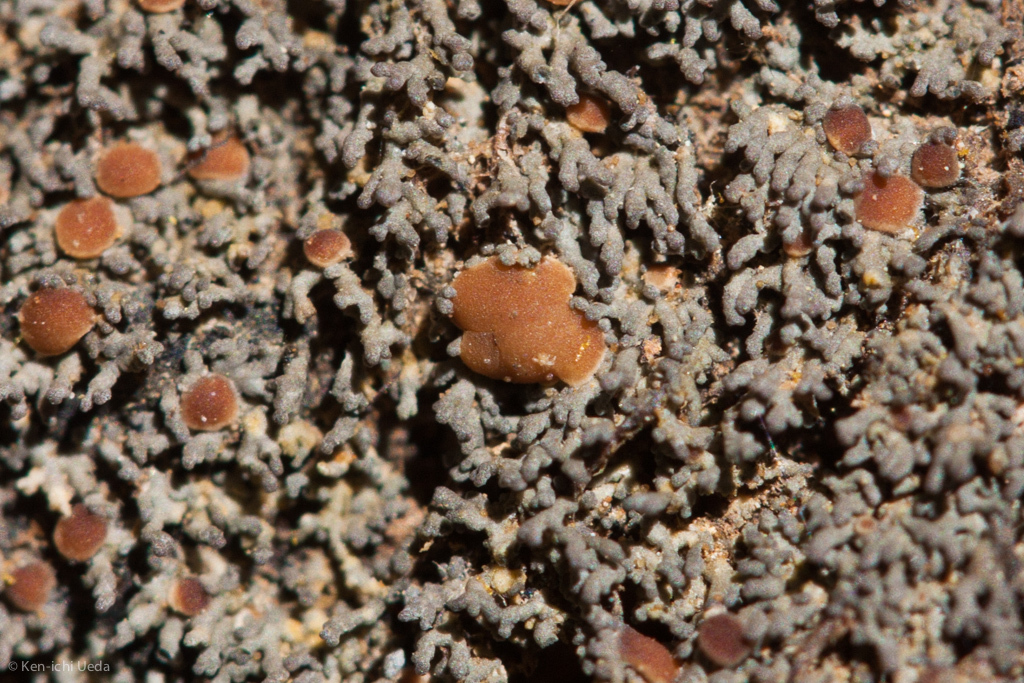
A reddish-brown disc colour, seen here in Fuscopannaria coralloidea, is typical for the genus.

The photosynthetic partner (photobiont) in Fuscopannaria is Nostoc, a type of cyanobacterium (formerly called "blue-green algae"). This partnership allows the lichen to fix atmospheric nitrogen, making it ecologically significant in nutrient-poor environments.

The reproductive structures, or ascomata, are apothecia—cup-shaped fruiting bodies that are directly attached to the thallus. These apothecia have a reddish-brown to black disc and may have a surrounding thalline margin that is similar in colour to the main body of the lichen. This margin is often reduced or absent in mature specimens. Inside the apothecia, the fungal tissue contains photobiont cells in a loosely arranged inner layer. The hymenium, the spore-producing layer, reacts with iodine (I+) by turning blue-green before shifting to red-brown, a property known as hemiamyloidy.

The fungal reproductive structures include eight-spored asci, each containing ellipsoidal, colourless spores. These spores are typically single-celled (aseptate) and often have small pointed ends, with a surface that may appear warted. Asexual reproduction occurs through conidia—small, rod-shaped spores produced in pycnidia, which are flask-shaped structures embedded within the thallus.

Chemically, Fuscopannaria species produce a variety of fatty acids and terpenes, although some species may lack detectable secondary metabolites.

== Species ==
As of November 2025, Species Fungorum (in the Catalogue of Life) accept 45 species of Fuscopannaria. The 2024 Outline of Fungi and fungus-like taxa suggests there are about 50 species in the genus.

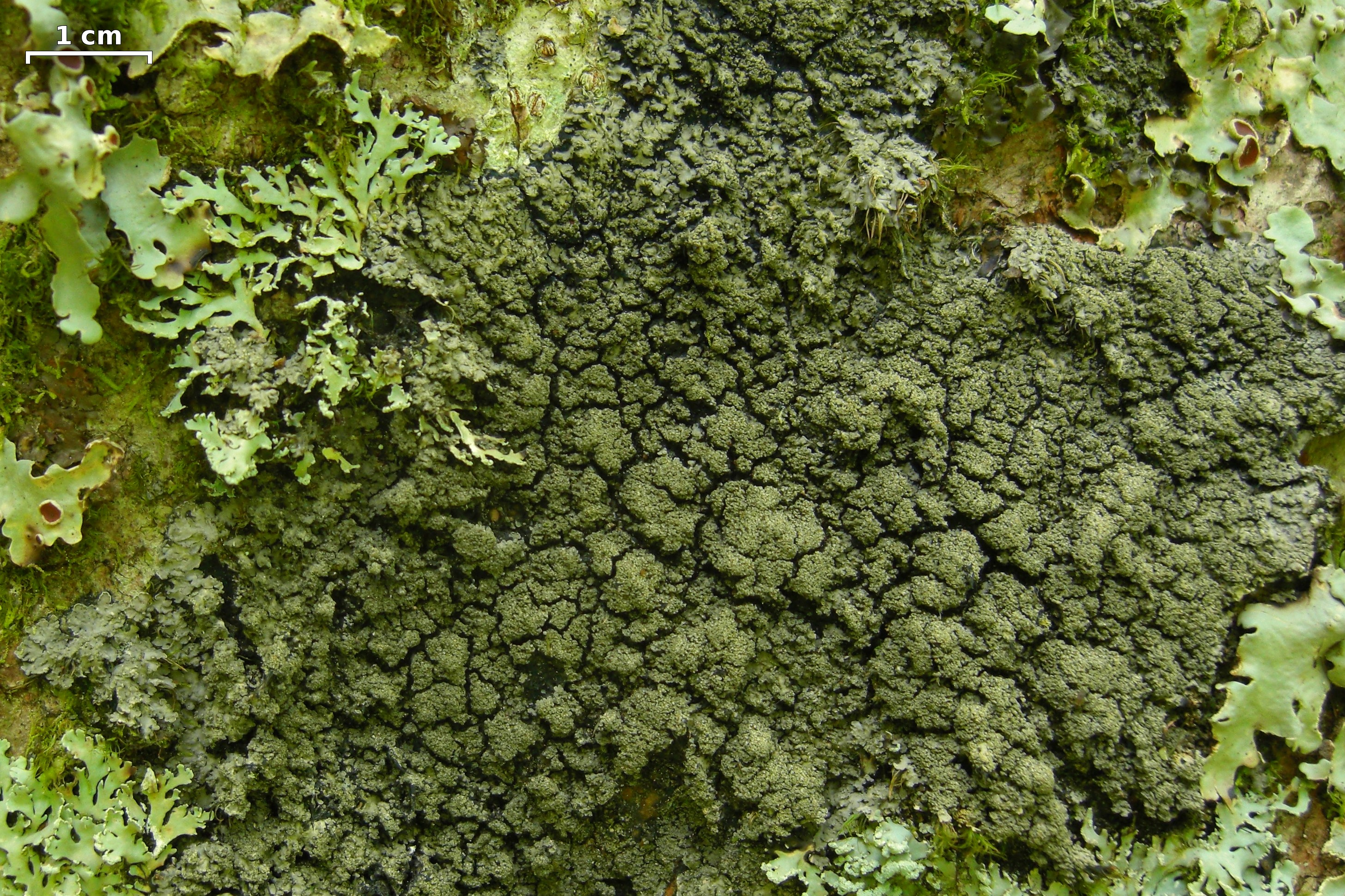
Fuscopannaria sorediata

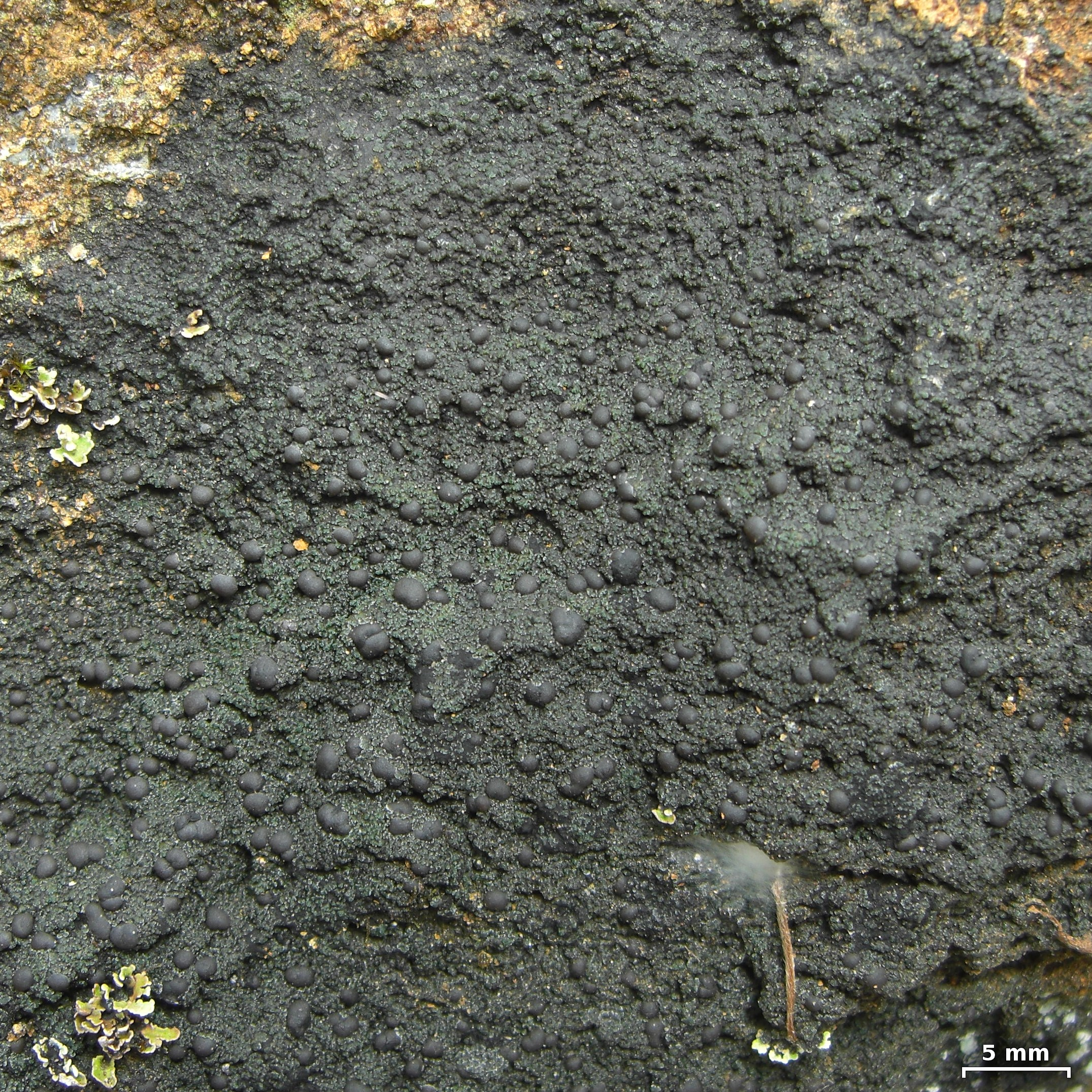
Fuscopannaria pacifica

- Fuscopannaria abscondita P.M.Jørg. (2002) – Svalbard
- Fuscopannaria alaskana P.M.Jørg. & Tønsberg (2000)
- Fuscopannaria albomaculata P.M.Jørg. (2004) – China
- Fuscopannaria aurita P.M.Jørg. (2000)
- Fuscopannaria cacuminum P.M.Jørg. & Sipman (2006) – Papua New Guinea
- Fuscopannaria caribaea Øvstedal (2007) – French Antilles
- Fuscopannaria cheiroloba (Müll.Arg.) P.M.Jørg. (2000)
- Fuscopannaria coerulescens P.M.Jørg. (2000) – Nepal; New Guinea
- Fuscopannaria confusa (P.M.Jørg.) P.M.Jørg. (1994)
- Fuscopannaria convexa P.M.Jørg. (2005)
- Fuscopannaria coralloidea P.M.Jørg. (2000)
- Fuscopannaria crustacea P.M.Jørg. (2000) – New Zealand
- Fuscopannaria cyanogranulosa P.M.Jørg. (2007) – China
- Fuscopannaria cyanolepra (Tuck.) P.M.Jørg. (2000)
- Fuscopannaria dillmaniae T.Sprib. (2020) – Alaska
- Fuscopannaria dispersa P.M.Jørg. (2000)
- Fuscopannaria dissecta P.M.Jørg. (2000)
- Fuscopannaria frullaniae (Maass) E.Tripp & Lendemer (2018)
- Fuscopannaria granulans P.M.Jørg. (1999) – New Zealand
- Fuscopannaria granulifera P.M.Jørg. & Upreti (2004) – India
- Fuscopannaria hirsuta P.M.Jørg. (2004) – China
- Fuscopannaria ignobilis (Anzi) P.M.Jørg. (1994)
- Fuscopannaria incisa (Pers.) P.M.Jørg. (2000)
- Fuscopannaria leprosa P.M.Jørg. & Tønsberg (2000)
- Fuscopannaria leucosticta (Tuck. ex E.Michener) P.M.Jørg. (1994)
- Fuscopannaria mediterranea (Tav.) P.M.Jørg. (1994)
- Fuscopannaria minor (Darb.) P.M.Jørg. (1999) – New Zealand
- Fuscopannaria nebulosa (Hoffm.) E.Tripp & Lendemer (2018)
- Fuscopannaria obtegens P.M.Jørg. (2007) – China
- Fuscopannaria pacifica P.M.Jørg. (2000)
- Fuscopannaria praetermissa (Nyl.) P.M.Jørg. (1994)
- Fuscopannaria ramulina P.M.Jørg. & Tønsberg (2000)
- Fuscopannaria rugosa H.J.Liu & J.S.Hu (2016) – China
- Fuscopannaria saltuensis P.M.Jørg. (2000)
- Fuscopannaria siamensis P.M.Jørg. & Wolseley (2000)
- Fuscopannaria sorediata P.M.Jørg. (2000) – eastern North America; Japan
- Fuscopannaria subgemmascens Upreti & Divakar (2005) – India
- Fuscopannaria subimmixta (C.Knight) P.M.Jørg. (1999) – New Zealand
- Fuscopannaria subincisa (Zahlbr.) P.M.Jørg. (2000)
- Fuscopannaria thiersii P.M.Jørg. (2000)
- Fuscopannaria venusta P.M.Jørg. & Sipman (2006) – Papua New Guinea
- Fuscopannaria viridescens P.M.Jørg. & Zhurb. (2002) – Siberia; Alaska
