= Theodor Magnus Fries =

Swedish botanist, lichenologist and Arctic explorer

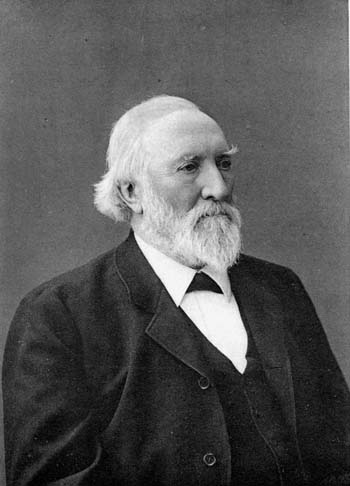
- Born: 28 October 1832; Femsjö, Sweden
- Died: 29 March 1913 (aged 80); Uppsala, Sweden
- Scientific career
- Fields: Botany, Lichenology
- Author abbrev. (botany): Th.Fr.

Theodor "Thore" Magnus Fries (28 October 1832 – 29 March 1913), was a Swedish botanist, lichenologist, and Arctic explorer. He was the son of the mycologist Elias Fries.

Following in his father's footsteps, Fries studied botany, obtaining his doctoral degree in 1857 at Uppsala. He is credited for introducing the term phyllocladium in a commentary about the lichen genus Stereocaulon in an 1858 publication. He became a member of the Royal Swedish Academy of Sciences in 1865 and professor of botany and applied economics at Uppsala in 1877. Fries edited some exsiccatae, e.g., Lichenes Scandinaviae rariores et critici exsiccati, quos collegit et distribuit Th.M. Fries and contributed to duplicate specimens series like Plantae in Itineribus Suecorum Polaribus collectae [1868]. His most notable work was Lichenographia scandinavica (1871–1874). He also produced a two-volume biography of Carl Linnaeus (1903).

Fries was part of two Arctic expeditions led by Adolf Erik Nordenskiöld, in 1868 and 1871. From 1893 to 1899, he was the vice-chancellor of Uppsala University. His sons Thore Christian Elias Fries and Robert Elias Fries also became botanists.

== See also ==
- Category:Taxa named by Theodor Magnus Fries

Academic offices
Preceded by Per Hedenius	Rector of Uppsala University; 1893 – 1899	Succeeded by Oscar Alin
