= Per Magnus Jørgensen =

Norwegian lichenologist

- Born: 25 July 1944 (age 82); Stavanger, Norway
- Education: University of Bergen; Uppsala University
- Awards: Acharius Medal
- Scientific career
- Fields: Botany; Lichenology
- Workplaces: University of Bergen
- Author abbrev. (botany): P.M.Jørg.

Per Magnus Jørgensen (born 1944) is a Norwegian botanist and lichenologist, and Professor Emeritus of systematic botany at the University of Bergen. He is known for his work on the lichen families Pannariaceae and Collemataceae. Jørgensen was awarded the Acharius Medal in 2021 for his lifetime contributions to lichenology.

== Biography ==
Jørgensen was born in Stavanger, Norway, in 1944. He obtained his Candidatus realium from the University of Bergen in 1969, where Knut Fægri was his supervisor. In 1978, he earned a doctor philosophiae from University of Bergen, with a dissertation titled "The lichen family Pannariaceae in Europe". He was a student of prominent lichenologist Rolf Santesson; Gunnar Degelius was another early mentor. During his time as a student, he was recruited to work at the Botanical Garden in Bergen. A few years after receiving his doctorate, he was appointed Professor of Systematic Botany at the University of Bergen in 1982. He was known for delivering his university lectures with great enthusiasm, and for helping to popularize botany in Norway. As of 2020, he is a Professor Emeritus at the University of Bergen.

Jørgensen is a member of the Norwegian Academy of Sciences. He has about 300 publications dealing with the systematics, floristics, biogeography, and nomenclature of lichens; in these papers he described about 300 taxa new to science. A specialist of the family Pannariaceae, he has also written about several other families in the third volume of the Nordic Lichen Flora. More recently, he has published several works about the history of lichenology. Examples include books on the history of botany in Norway, and on the history of Bergen's Museumgarden, and publications on Carl Linnaeus and Johan Ernst Gunnerus, including translating the latter's 1770 work Flora Norvegica from Latin into Norwegian. Jørgensen is a connoisseur of the plant genus Rhododendron and maintains a large collection of these plants in the Bergen botanical garden. He was editor of the popular science magazine Naturen from 1991 to 1997.

Jørgensen became an honorary lifetime member of the British Lichen Society in 2008. In 2021 Jørgensen was awarded the Acharius Medal, recognizing his lifelong contribution to lichenology.

Lichen taxa named in honour of Jørgensen include the species Stigmidium joergensenii R.Sant. (1989), Leptogium joergensenii Marcelli & Kitaura (2014), and the genus Joergensenia Passo, S.Stenroos & Calvelo (2008).

== Selected publications ==
- Jørgensen, Per M. (1978). The Lichen Family Pannariaceae in Europe. Opera Botanica. Vol. 45. Stockholm: Swedish Natural Science Research Council. pp. 1–123.
- Jørgensen, Per M.; James, Peter W.; Jarvis, Charles E. (1994). "Linnaean lichen names and their typification". Botanical Journal of the Linnean Society. 115 (4): 261–405. doi:10.1111/j.1095-8339.1994.tb01784.x.
- Jørgensen, Per M. (2001). "Great discoveries in bryology and lichenology: Th. M. Fries (1832–1913), great Scandinavian lichenologist". The Bryologist. 104 (4): 537–542. doi:10.1639/0007-2745(2001)104[0537:TMFAGS]2.0.CO;2. JSTOR 3244587.
- Jørgensen, Per M. (2002). Conspectus familiae Pannariaceae (Ascomycetes lichenosae) (PDF). Ilicifolia. Vol. 4. Bergen: Botanisk institutt, Universitetet i Bergen. pp. 1–78. ISBN 82-7460-014-2.
- Jørgensen, Per M. (2007). "History of lichenology in Norway up to 1973". Bibliotheca Lichenologica. 95: 41–61.
- Jørgensen, Per M., ed. (2007). Botanikkens historie i Norge [History of Botany in Norway] (in Norwegian). Bergen: Fagbokforlaget Vignostad & Bjoeke AS. ISBN 978-82-450-04991.
- Jørgensen, Per M. (2017). "The development of lichenology in the history of botany". The Bryologist. 120 (1): 37–44. doi:10.1639/0007-2745-120.1.037. S2CID 90626078.

== See also ==
- Category:Taxa named by Per Magnus Jørgensen
