= Pannaria streimannii =

Scientific classification
- Kingdom: Fungi
- Division: Ascomycota
- Class: Lecanoromycetes
- Order: Peltigerales
- Family: Pannariaceae
- Genus: Pannaria
- Species: P. streimannii

Binomial name
- Pannaria streimannii Elvebakk (2012)
- Holotype: Mount Gower summit, Lord Howe Island

Species of lichen-forming fungus

Pannaria streimannii is a species of lichen-forming fungus in the family Pannariaceae. It is a foliose lichen with broad, leaf-like lobes, forming loose mats on stems and rocks in the high-elevation vegetation of Lord Howe Island. The species produces abundant phyllidia, small leaf-like outgrowths that act as vegetative propagules, allowing it to spread without forming sexual fruiting bodies. It was formally described in 2012 and is endemic to Lord Howe Island. It occurs at high elevation on Mount Gower and is known from only a small number of records.

== Taxonomy ==
Pannaria streimannii was described as a new species in 2012 by the Norwegian lichenologist Arve Elvebakk, from material collected on Lord Howe Island (New South Wales, Australia). The holotype was gathered on 11 February 1995 from the summit area of Mount Gower at 820 m elevation, where it grew on the stem of the small tree Atractocarpus stipularis. In the original diagnosis, it was described as similar to Pannaria howeana, but differing in its lack of apothecia and in producing phyllidia (small, leaf-like outgrowths that act as vegetative propagules).

The species is named in honour of Heinar Streimann (1938–2001), who collected the type material and studied Australasian bryophyte and lichen diversity. P. streimannii was treated as a phyllidiate counterpart of P. howeana. The two were considered closely related and reported to share a secondary-chemistry pattern, with porphyrilic acid together with vicanicin and leprolomin.

== Description ==
Pannaria streimannii is a tripartite, foliose Pannaria with broad lobes. The lobe margin is very narrow and recurved, marking the growth zone. Like its close relative P. howeana, it is only loosely attached to the substrate because it has few rhizines. The lower surface shows long, adpressed hyphae arranged in lengthwise lines that radiate along the branching lobes. The upper surface is partly covered by a sparse tomentum, a thin, fuzzy covering.

The most conspicuous feature is the abundant phyllidia. They are semi-erect, typically 0.2 to 1.0 mm wide (occasionally to 2.5 mm), usually round to nearly round, and narrowed at the base. Other ascending lobules were not seen in the type material. Apothecia, the sexual fruiting bodies, were not observed. In older herbarium material, the thalli remained pale olive green and did not rapidly shift to violet-brown when rewetted, unlike many other tripartite Pannaria species. The green algal cells were described as myrmecioid and unusually small. As with P. howeana, the reported secondary chemistry includes porphyrilic acid together with vicanicin and leprolomin.

== Habitat and distribution ==
Pannaria streimannii is endemic to Lord Howe Island and is known only a small number of records from high elevations on Mount Gower. The type collection is from the Mount Gower summit area at 820 m. It grew on the stem of Atractocarpus stipularis in low summit vegetation dominated by Metrosideros nervulosa, Zygogynum howeanum, Didymocheton pachyphyllus, Dracophyllum, tree ferns, and palms. A second collection is known from the slope of Mount Gower. That specimen grew on rock and was described as probably common on the slopes.
