= Gibbosporina =

Scientific classification
- Domain: Eukaryota
- Kingdom: Fungi
- Division: Ascomycota
- Class: Lecanoromycetes
- Order: Peltigerales
- Family: Pannariaceae
- Genus: Gibbosporina; Elvebakk, S.G.Hong & P.M.Jørg. (2016)

Type species
- Gibbosporina boninensis (Kurok.) Elvebakk & P.M.Jørg. (2016)

Genus of lichens in the family Pannariaceae

Gibbosporina is a genus of 13 species of foliose lichens in the family Pannariaceae. It contains species that molecular phylogenetic analysis clustered together in a clade previously referred to as the "Physma"-group. Despite their morphological differences, this group shares several uniting characteristics. They have ring-like excipular margins around the thallus; strongly amyloid internal ascus structures; well-developed perispores (a colorless, often gelatinous layer that envelops a spore) that feature irregular gibbae (irregular bumps), but not verrucae (small, rounded wart-like protuberances); lacks secondary compounds than can be detected by thin-layer chromatography; and have tropical distributions.

== Taxonomy ==
It was circumscribed as a new genus in 2016 by Arve Elvebakk, Soon Gyu Hong and Per Magnus Jørgensen. The type species of the genus was assigned to Gibbosporina boninensis, originally described in 1969 by Syo Kurokawa as Psoroma boninense. The genus name, which combines the Latin gibbus ("with hump-like swellings") with spora, refers to the characteristic spore feature.

== Species ==
- Gibbosporina acuminata Elvebakk (2016) – Australia; the Philippines
- Gibbosporina amphorella Elvebakk & S.G.Hong (2016) – New Caledonia
- Gibbosporina bifrons Elvebakk, S.G.Hong & P.M.Jørg. (2016) – Malaysia; New Caledonia; the Philippines; Solomon Islands
- Gibbosporina boninensis (Kurok.) Elvebakk & P.M.Jørg. (2016)
- Gibbosporina cyanea Elvebakk (2021) – Sri Lanka
- Gibbosporina didyma Elvebakk, S.G.Hong & P.M.Jørg. (2016) – Mauritius; Réunion
- Gibbosporina elixii Elvebakk, S.G.Hong & P.M.Jørg. (2016) – Australia
- Gibbosporina leptospora Elvebakk (2016) – Australia; Fiji; New Caledonia; Papua New Guinea
- Gibbosporina mascarena Elvebakk, S.G.Hong & P.M.Jørg. (2016)
- Gibbosporina nitida Elvebakk, S.G. Hong & P.M.Jørg. (2016) – Australia; Fiji; Papua New Guinea; the Philippines
- Gibbosporina papillospora Elvebakk (2016) – the Philippines
- Gibbosporina sphaerospora Elvebakk & S.G.Hong (2016) – Australia; Fiji, Indonesia; Malaysia; Papua New Guinea; the Philippines; Samoa
- Gibbosporina thamnophora Elvebakk & P.M.Jørg. (2016) – Australia; Papua New Guinea

The species Gibbosporina phyllidiata was originally included in this genus, but later research showed that the lichen contained the secondary chemical pannarin and was therefore moved to genus Pannaria with the new name P. melanesica (a new name was required as Pannaria phyllidiata already existed for a different species).
