= Calopadia cinereopruinosa =

Scientific classification
- Kingdom: Fungi
- Division: Ascomycota
- Class: Lecanoromycetes
- Order: Lecanorales
- Family: Ectolechiaceae
- Genus: Calopadia
- Species: C. cinereopruinosa

Binomial name
- Calopadia cinereopruinosa Bungartz & Lücking (2011)

Species of lichen

Calopadia cinereopruinosa is a species of corticolous (bark-dwelling) lichen in the family Ectolechiaceae. Found in the Galápagos Islands, it was described as new to science in 2011. It is characterized by its grey-black, white-pruinose apothecia and aeruginous hypothecium. This lichen usually grows on the bark of stems and twigs in the humid zones of the islands.

== Taxonomy ==
Calopadia cinereopruinosa was first scientifically described by the lichenologists Frank Bungartz and Robert Lücking in 2011. The type specimen was collected by the first author from San Cristóbal Island, at an elevation of 400 m (1,300 ft); there, in an open Psidium guajava shrubland it was found growing on the bark, wood, and dead twigs of Psidium guajava. The species epithet cinereopruinosa is derived from its grey-black, white-pruinose apothecia.

== Description ==
This lichen species forms a corticolous thallus that can be continuous or marginally dispersed into rounded, confluent patches. The thallus measures up to 30 mm (1 1/5 in) across and 20–40 μm thick, displaying a smooth, pale grey to greenish-grey colour. The apothecia are rounded, measuring 0.4–1 mm in diameter and 250–350 μm high, with a grey-black disc and a distinct white pruina. The apothecial margin is thick and prominent when young, also grey-black and white-pruinose.

The ascospores of Calopadia cinereopruinosa are single, oblong to ellipsoid in shape, muriform, and colourless, measuring 45–80 by 15–25 μm. The campylidia are sessile, with a well-developed, hood-shaped, grey lobe that is white-pruinose.

=== Similar species ===
Calopadia cinereopruinosa closely resembles Calopadia subcoerulescens in terms of its grey-black apothecia and aeruginous hypothecium. However, the apothecia of Calopadia cinereopruinosa are thickly and persistently pruinose, a feature not observed in Calopadia subcoerulescens. The new species is also similar to Calopadia editiae, which forms pruinose apothecia and has ascospores shorter than 100 μm. However, Calopadia editiae has brownish apothecia with a yellowish tinge, and its hypothecium is light brown. Calopadia saxicola, a saxicolous (rock-dwelling) species growing on rocky seashores in southern Brazil, also has pruinose apothecia and muriform ascospores. However, C. saxicola has a corticate thallus with a brownish to reddish-brown apothecial disc and a brownish to dark brown hypothecium.

== Habitat and distribution ==
Calopadia cinereopruinosa is found in the Galápagos Islands, mainly on Isla San Cristóbal. It grows in the transition zone towards the humid upper parts of the island. Collections with campylidia have also been found on other islands, mostly in the humid zone. The species typically grows on bark of stems and twigs.
