= Calopadia floridana =

Scientific classification
- Kingdom: Fungi
- Division: Ascomycota
- Class: Lecanoromycetes
- Order: Lecanorales
- Family: Ectolechiaceae
- Genus: Calopadia
- Species: C. floridana

Binomial name
- Calopadia floridana Hodges & Lücking (2011)

Species of lichen-forming fungus

Calopadia floridana is a species of crustose lichen in the family Ectolechiaceae. It was first described from collections made in subtropical Florida. It has relatively large, gray-brown apothecia with a coarse white pruinose (powdery) coating on the disk, and each ascus contains a single muriform ascospore (divided into many small compartments).

== Taxonomy ==
Calopadia floridana was described as new in 2011 by Malcolm Hodges and Robert Lücking. The holotype (the single specimen designated as the name-bearing type) was collected in March 2009 in Fakahatchee Strand Preserve State Park (Collier County, Florida), along Janes Scenic Drive about 6.5 miles (10.5 km) north-northwest of the ranger station (west of the old tram), in a Taxodium–Sabal hardwood hammock. It was found on a Taxodium branch and is deposited in the Field Museum herbarium (F). The specific epithet refers to its discovery in Florida.

The species was distinguished from Calopadia puiggarii by its larger, pruinose apothecia. It was placed among Calopadia species with single, muriform ascospores under 100 μm long, and compared with similar species that differ in apothecial pruina, apothecial size, or ascospore length.

== Description ==
The thallus grows on bark as patches, typically 1–3 cm across and about 30–50 μm (micrometers) thick, typically 1–3 cm across and about 30–50 μm thick. It is continuous in the center but becomes patchy toward the edges. The surface is uneven and ranges from white to pale gray. The photobiont (the photosynthetic partner) is a green alga with chlorococcoid cells.

The apothecia are rounded and sessile (sitting directly on the thallus), and relatively large for the genus, about 0.6–1.2 mm in diameter and 250–350 μm high. The disk is flat to slightly convex, dark gray to brownish gray, and coarsely white-pruinose (powdery). The margin is thin and pale gray to cream-colored. Microscopically, the excipulum is colorless (about 50–70 μm wide) and the hypothecium is dark brown (about 30–50 μm high); the apothecial base is aeruginous (blue-green). The hymenium is colorless and about 120–150 μm high, with paraphyses that are unbranched to slightly branched."

Each ascus contains a single ellipsoid muriform ascospore (divided by many internal walls), measuring about 50–80 × 17–25 μm. The species also produces campylidia (about 0.6–1.2 mm broad and 1–1.5 mm long) with a well-developed, hood-shaped lobe that is dark gray with a paler apex and pruinose. The conidia are threadlike (filiform) with a club-shaped (clavate) tip, 5–7-septate, and about 50–70 × 1.5–2 μm. No lichen substances were detected by thin-layer chromatography.

== Habitat and distribution ==
The species is known from two collections in Florida: the type locality in Fakahatchee Strand Preserve State Park (Collier County) and an additional record from Sumter County. It grows on the smoother bark of small Taxodium branches and has also been found where the wood is exposed (lacking periderm), and on hardwood bark.

The holotype bears only mature, heavily pruinose apothecia, whereas the Sumter County collection includes younger apothecia with little pruina, suggesting that the pruinose coating develops as the apothecia age. It was contrasted with Calopadia editiae (also pruinose, but with lighter brown tones and pruina extending onto the margin), C. puiggarii (similar internally, but with smaller, non-pruinose apothecia), and C. perpallida (with longer ascospores and differently colored apothecia and pruina).
