= Pannaria howeana =

Scientific classification
- Kingdom: Fungi
- Division: Ascomycota
- Class: Lecanoromycetes
- Order: Peltigerales
- Family: Pannariaceae
- Genus: Pannaria
- Species: P. howeana

Binomial name
- Pannaria howeana Elvebakk (2012)
- Holotype: Mount Gower summit, Lord Howe Island

Species of lichen-forming fungus

Pannaria howeana is a species of foliose lichen in the family Pannariaceae. It is known only from the summit area of Mount Gower on Lord Howe Island. The lichen forms loose, leaf-like rosettes up to 10 centimetres across on tree bark in the montane vegetation, where it is distinguished by its sparse root-like attachments, distinctive lower surface with radiating fungal filaments, and a characteristic combination of chemical compounds including porphyrilic acid. It was formally described in 2012 based on a single collection from shaded Dracophyllum stems in the summit area.

== Taxonomy ==
Pannaria howeana was described as a new species in 2012 by the Norwegian lichenologist Arve Elvebakk, based on material from Lord Howe Island (New South Wales, Australia). The holotype was collected on 11 February 1995 from a shaded stem of Dracophyllum in the summit area of Mt Gower at 820 m elevation. It is a tripartite, foliose member of the family Pannariaceae and is known only from this single collection.

Pannaria araneosa from New Zealand was regarded as the closest known relative, based on shared features such as sparse rhizines, a distinctive lower surface with radiating hyphae, and a very narrow, recurved lobe margin. P. howeana differs from P. araneosa in having thinner lobes, less surface tomentum, and a characteristic chemistry that includes porphyrilic acid together with vicanicin and little or no leprolomin.

== Description ==
The thallus forms a loose, foliose rosette, typically 5–10 cm across, and is only weakly attached to the bark substrate. The lobes are irregularly branched and slightly concave, about 1.5–3.0 mm wide, with a distinctly narrow, recurved margin. Small, ascending lobules are also present. The upper surface is pale greenish grey when fresh and becomes pale yellowish brown in herbarium storage. It is glossy and mostly smooth, with only a faint tomentum near the margins. The lower surface lacks a true lower cortex. Instead, the lowest part of the medulla forms a pattern of pale brown, radiating hyphae. Rhizines are sparse, pale brown, and unbranched, mostly concentrated in the older central parts of the thallus.

Pannaria howeana is a tripartite lichen with two photosynthetic partners: a green alga in the main thallus and cyanobacteria housed in cephalodia. The cephalodia are common on the upper surface and contain Nostoc. Apothecia, the fruiting bodies, are common, with rufous-brown discs and a thalline margin that is crenulate-striate and strongly incurved. Each ascus contains eight spores. The ascospores are ellipsoid and roughened, measuring about 13.5–17.0 × 8–10 μm. Including the perispore, they measure 14–18 × 9–11 μm, and they lack apical extensions. Thin-layer chromatography detected porphyrilic acid and vicanicin as the main lichen substances, with leprolomin only weakly present or absent.

== Habitat and distribution ==
Pannaria howeana is a bark-dwelling lichen endemic to Lord Howe Island. It is known from the summit area of Mount Gower, where it was collected at 820 m. It grew on a shaded stem of Dracophyllum in low summit vegetation dominated by Metrosideros nervulosa, Zygogynum howeanum, Didymocheton pachyphyllus, Dracophyllum, tree ferns, and palms. No additional localities have been reported, and its population status on the island remains poorly documented.
