= Pannaria isidiosa =

Scientific classification
- Kingdom: Fungi
- Division: Ascomycota
- Class: Lecanoromycetes
- Order: Peltigerales
- Family: Pannariaceae
- Genus: Pannaria
- Species: P. isidiosa

Binomial name
- Pannaria isidiosa Elvebakk & Elix (2006)
- Holotype: New England National Park, Australia

Species of lichen

Pannaria isidiosa is a species of foliose lichen in the family Pannariaceae, described in 2006. Found in montane forests of New South Wales, Australia, it grows on tree bark and occasionally on ferns at elevations between 1200 and 1450 metres. The lichen forms leaf-like rosettes with abundant coral-like reproductive structures known as isidia. It contains a unique combination of secondary metabolites, including pannarin and methylplacodiolic acid, as well as unidentified terpenoids. Closely related to Pannaria xanthomelana, this species is distinguished by its distinctive lemon-shaped spores and complex chemosyndrome.

== Taxonomy ==
Pannaria isidiosa was described as a new species in 2006 by the lichenologists Arve Elvebakk and John A. Elix. The type specimen was collected by Leif Tibell from New South Wales, Australia, within New England National Park along the Lyrebird Walk, at an elevation of 1,250–1,450 m (4,100–4,760 ft). It was found growing on the bark of Eucalyptus nitens. The species name isidiosa alludes to the abundance of its distinctive isidia, which are more or less spherical (globose) to coral-shaped (coralloid).

== Description ==
Pannaria isidiosa is a foliose lichen, meaning it has a leaf-like structure. Its thallus (body) forms loosely attached rosettes ranging from 5–20 cm in diameter. The lobes of the thallus are irregularly branched and may overlap slightly at the edges, becoming more tightly packed toward the centre. These lobes are weakly concave and measure 0.5–1.5 mm wide. The lichen's upper surface is smooth and varies in color: fresh specimens are likely whitish-grey when dry, but they may turn yellowish-brown over time, particularly in herbarium storage.

A prominent feature of P. isidiosa is its abundant isidia, which are small, vegetative outgrowths used for reproduction. These isidia begin as tiny, round structures around 0.1 mm in diameter but can grow into branching, coral-like masses that may cover large portions of the thallus.

The lichen lacks a lower cortex (a protective layer), but it has simple brown rhizines—hair-like structures that help anchor it to the surface it grows on. The medulla, a middle layer of loosely packed fungal tissue, is 100–170 μm thick. Beneath the medulla, a felted brown layer called the hypothallus is moderately developed.

The apothecia (fruiting bodies) of P. isidiosa are common and appear as small discs 1–2.5 mm wide, occasionally up to 3 mm. These discs are reddish-brown, often with a frosty appearance (from pruina), and may develop concentric grooves. The edges of the apothecia are initially striated (grooved), but they frequently become covered by the isidia. The ascospores (spores produced inside the apothecia) are ellipsoid to slightly teardrop-shaped, measuring 16–19 μm by 6–10 μm. They have a rough, warty outer coating and distinctive extensions at their tips, giving them a citron-like shape.

This lichen also hosts two types of symbiotic algae: green algae and cyanobacteria. The green algae are found in a layer near the surface, while the cyanobacteria, housed in structures called cephalodia, are distributed across the thallus. Cephalodia are small, globular structures that contain cyanobacteria and play a role in nitrogen fixation, a process crucial for nutrient cycling in the lichen's environment.

Pannaria isidiosa contains pannarin, porphyrilic acid, methylplacodiolic acid, and a suite of four previously unidentified terpenoids, making its chemosyndrome more complex than those of related species.

=== Similar species ===
This species is most closely related to Pannaria xanthomelana, a species originally described as endemic to New Zealand. While both species share similarities in their thallus texture and apothecia structure, P. isidiosa is distinguished by its longer, lemon-shaped (citriform) spores with verrucose perispores, as well as its unique chemical profile.

== Habitat, distribution, and ecology ==
Pannaria isidiosa is found in montane forests of New South Wales, Australia, and has been recorded in two distinct areas separated by 400–500 km along the Great Dividing Range. It grows at elevations between 1200 and 1450 metres, preferring cool, moist environments.

This lichen typically colonizes the bark of various trees and shrubs, including Eucalyptus nitens, Doryphora sassafras, and Prostanthera species. It has also been observed growing on the tree fern Dicksonia antarctica and on a planted Castanea tree. P. isidiosa is often associated with bryophytes (mosses and liverworts) on tree trunks, suggesting that it prefers substrates with ample moisture retention.
