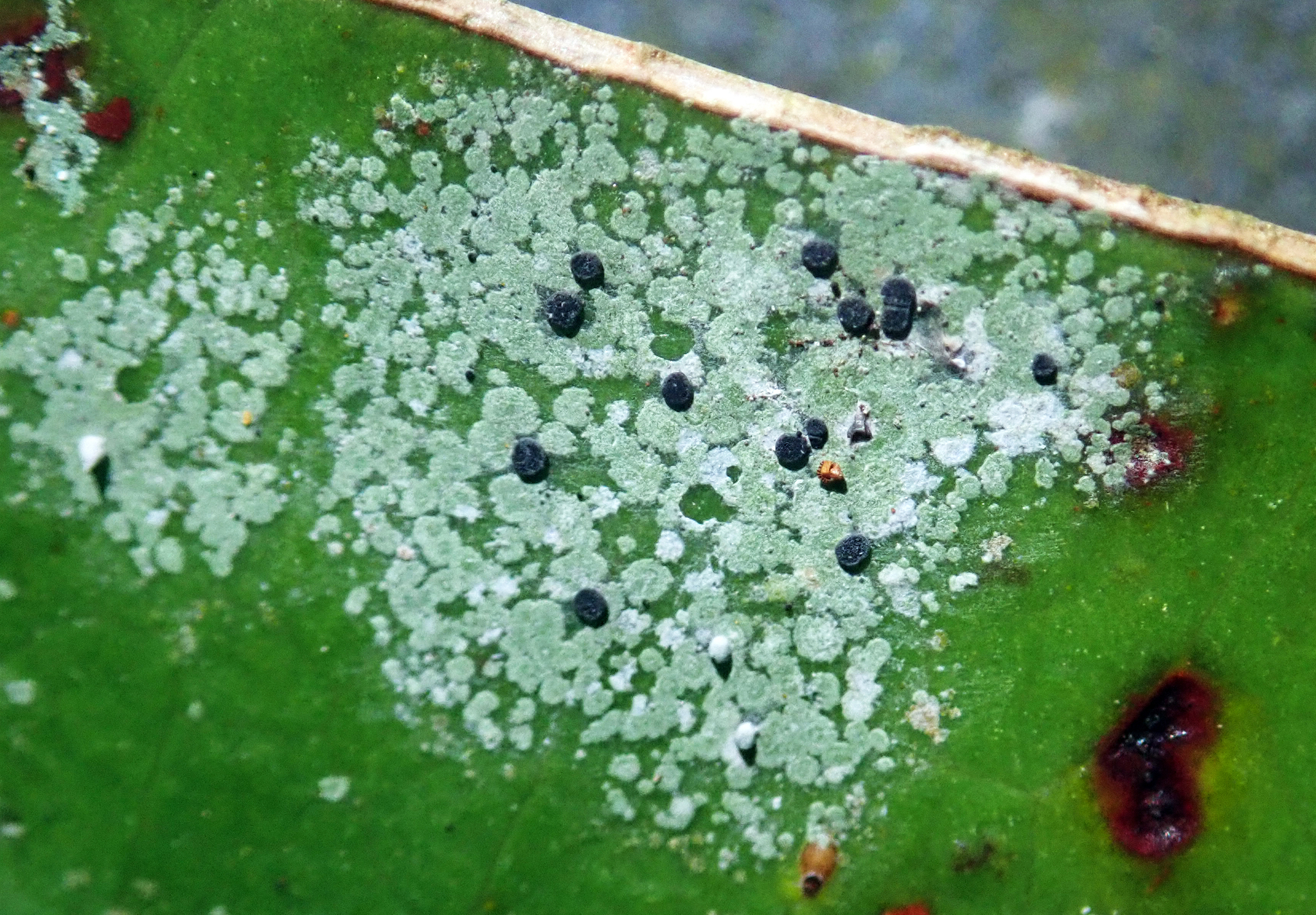
- Calopadia subcoerulescens

Scientific classification
- Kingdom: Fungi
- Division: Ascomycota
- Class: Lecanoromycetes
- Order: Lecanorales
- Family: Ectolechiaceae
- Genus: Calopadia; Vèzda (1986)

Type species
- Calopadia fusca (Müll.Arg.) Vězda (1986)

Species
- See text

Synonyms
- Crocicreomyces Bat. & Peres (1964); Cyrta Bat. & H.Maia (1961)

= Calopadia =

Genus of lichen-forming fungi

Calopadia is a genus of foliicolous (leaf-dwelling) lichens in the family Ectolechiaceae. The genus was established by the Czech lichenologist Antonín Vězda in 1986 and contains around 24 species found primarily in tropical regions. These lichens form thin, pale brownish to greyish crusts on leaf surfaces and produce small brown disc-shaped fruiting bodies. They are distinguished from similar genera by their non-black fruiting structures and characteristic curved or coiled asexual spores. The genus has its greatest diversity in the Neotropics, though species have also been recorded from tropical Africa, Asia, and Australasia.

== Taxonomy ==
Calopadia was circumscribed by the Czech lichenologist Antonín Vězda in 1986. Calopadia was one of five new genera (alongside Badimia, Barubria, Loflammia, and Logilvia) established by Vězda in 1986 when he divided his informal "Lobaca" assemblage on the basis of ascus structure. Species with a Sporopodium-type ascus were transferred to the newly delimited Ectolechiaceae, within which Vězda placed Calopadia together with the previously known genera Tapellaria and Lasioloma because of their shared campylidia (specialised conidiomata derived from apothecia)

== Description ==
Calopadia forms a thin, continuous or occasionally patchy thallus (the body of the lichen), usually smooth and pale brownish to greyish in colour. The apothecia (fruiting bodies) are constricted at the base and brown to dark brown, but not black; their margins are prominent when young, later fading or disappearing. The exciple—the tissue forming the rim around the apothecial disc—is paraplectenchymatous (composed of small, brick-like cells), while the hypothecium (the layer beneath the spore-bearing tissue) does not react with potassium hydroxide (K–). The hymenium contains simple or only slightly branched paraphyses (filamentous supporting cells). The asci are cylindric-clavate (cylindrical to club-shaped) with a blue-staining (J+) tholus, showing the ascus structure characteristic of Sporopodium. The ascospores are muriform (divided by both transverse and longitudinal walls) and variable in number, from one to eight per ascus.

The asexual reproductive structures, or campylidia, are grey to dark brown and produce conidia (asexual spores) that are acicular (needle-shaped), curved or spirally coiled, and multi-septate (divided by many cross-walls). The conidia arise in association with small algal cells near the thallus surface. In overall appearance and spore type, Calopadia resembles Tapellaria, but differs in having non-black apothecia, a K– hypothecium, and a continuous rather than patchy thallus.

A field study of Calopadia puiggarii documented the full life cycle of a Calopadia species on living leaves and showed how sexual and asexual reproduction can both contribute to thallus formation. In that study, campylidia contained photobiont cells among the conidiogenous tissue, and the filiform, septate macroconidia were released together with algal cells that they often encircled; the macroconidia could then germinate and lichenize those dispersed photobionts. The same work reported pycnidia in Calopadia for the first time; these minute structures produce microconidia that were interpreted as likely spermatia (male gametes).

=== Chemistry ===
Chemical studies using thin-layer chromatography and high-performance liquid chromatography have reported a range of secondary metabolites in Calopadia, including pannarin and atranorin, along with several chlorinated xanthones (lichexanthone derivatives). In some species, discrete chemotypes have been reported; for example, C. perpallida and C. subcoerulescens have been described with more than one "chemical race" based on their detected compounds.

== Species ==
As of February 2026, Species Fungorum (in the Catalogue of Life) accept 24 species of Calopadia.

- Calopadia aurantiaca Lücking (2008)
- Calopadia bonitensis M.Cáceres & Lücking (2007)
- Calopadia chacoensis (Malme) Kalb & Vězda (1987) (= Lopadium chacoensis, MycoBank)
- Calopadia cinereopruinosa Bungartz & Lücking (2011)
- Calopadia editiae Vězda ex Chaves & Lücking (2011)
- Calopadia erythrocephala Farkas, Elix & Flakus (2012)
- Calopadia floridana Hodges & Lücking (2011)
- Calopadia foliicola (Fée) Vězda (1986)
- Calopadia fusca (Müll.Arg.) Vězda (1986)
- Calopadia granulosa Aptroot & M.Cáceres (2014) – Brazil
- Calopadia imshaugii Common & Lücking (2011)
- Calopadia lucida Lücking & R.Sant. (2001)
- Calopadia nymanii (R.Sant.) Vězda (1986)
- Calopadia perpallida (Nyl.) Vězda (1986)
- Calopadia phyllogena (Müll.Arg.) Vězda (1986)
- Calopadia puiggarii (Müll.Arg.) Vězda (1986)
- Calopadia ruiliensis H.X.Wu (2021) – China
- Calopadia saxicola Gumboski (2015)
- Calopadia schaeferi Vězda (2004)
- Calopadia schomerae Seavey & J.Seavey (2011)
- Calopadia subcoerulescens (Zahlbr.) Vězda (1988)
- Calopadia subfusca Kalb & Vězda (1987)
- Calopadia turbinata (Tuck.) Sérus. & Lücking (2005)
- Calopadia vermiculifera (Vain.) Sérus. (1997)
