= Gibbosporina boninensis =

Scientific classification
- Domain: Eukaryota
- Kingdom: Fungi
- Division: Ascomycota
- Class: Lecanoromycetes
- Order: Peltigerales
- Family: Pannariaceae
- Genus: Gibbosporina
- Species: G. boninensis

Binomial name
- Gibbosporina boninensis (Kurok.) Elvebakk & P.M.Jørg. (2016)

Synonyms
- Psoroma boninense Kurok. (1969)

Species of lichen in the family Pannariaceae

Gibbosporina boninensis is a species of foliose lichen in the family Pannariaceae. It was described as a new species in 1969 by Syo Kurokawa as Psoroma boninense. The type was collected on an andesite-rich rugged mountaintop of Mt. Tsutsuji in Chichijima, Japan. In 2016, Arve Elvebakk and Per Magnus Jørgensen transferred the taxon to the newly circumscribed genus Gibbosporina, of which it is the type species. The lichen occurs only in the isolated subtropical Bonin Islands, for which it is named.
