= Gibbosporina thamnophora =

Scientific classification
- Domain: Eukaryota
- Kingdom: Fungi
- Division: Ascomycota
- Class: Lecanoromycetes
- Order: Peltigerales
- Family: Pannariaceae
- Genus: Gibbosporina
- Species: G. thamnophora

Binomial name
- Gibbosporina thamnophora Elvebakk & P.M.Jørg. (2016)

Species of lichen in the family Pannariaceae

Gibbosporina thamnophora is a species of foliose lichen in the family Pannariaceae. It was described as a new species in 2016 by Arve Elvebakk and Per Magnus Jørgensen. The type was collected from Eungella National Park in Queensland, Australia, where it was found growing on bark in a tropical rainforest near Broken River. The specific epithet thamnophora combines the Greek thamnos ("shrub") and -phora ("carrier"), and refers to the finely branched, shrubby cephalodia that are "carried" by the chlorobiont. The lichen occurs in Australia and Papua New Guinea.
