= Gibbosporina bifrons =

Scientific classification
- Domain: Eukaryota
- Kingdom: Fungi
- Division: Ascomycota
- Class: Lecanoromycetes
- Order: Peltigerales
- Family: Pannariaceae
- Genus: Gibbosporina
- Species: G. bifrons

Binomial name
- Gibbosporina bifrons Elvebakk, S.G.Hong & P.M.Jørg. (2016)

Species of lichen in the family Pannariaceae

Gibbosporina bifrons is a species of foliose lichen in the family Pannariaceae. It was described as a new species in 2016 by Arve Elvebakk, Soon Gyu Hong, and Per Magnus Jørgensen. The specific epithet bifrons, meaning "two-faced", refers to the well-developed and large cephalodia that occur with the green algal photobiont. The lichen occurs in the Philippines, Solomon Islands, Malaysia, and New Caledonia.
