= Pannaria minutiphylla =

Scientific classification
- Kingdom: Fungi
- Division: Ascomycota
- Class: Lecanoromycetes
- Order: Peltigerales
- Family: Pannariaceae
- Genus: Pannaria
- Species: P. minutiphylla

Binomial name
- Pannaria minutiphylla Elvebakk (2013)

Species of lichen

Pannaria minutiphylla is a species of lichen in the family Pannariaceae, described as a new species in 2013 by Arve Elvebakk. The species is similar to Pannaria phyllidiata, but can be distinguished by its smaller phyllidia and ascospores that are elongated to ellipsoid.

== Taxonomy ==
Pannaria minutiphylla was formally described by Arve Elvebakk in 2013. The specific epithet minutiphylla refers to the species' numerous small phyllidia.

== Description ==
The lichen has a foliose (leafy) thallus, that is either corticolous (bark-dwelling), foliicolous (leaf-dwelling), or occasionally saxicolous (rock-dwelling). It forms rosettes of 3–15 cm (1 3/16–5 7/8 in) in diameter. The lobes are irregularly to somewhat dichotomously branched. These lobes are discrete in peripheral parts of the thallus, and imbricate towards the centre. The upper surface of the thallus is pale greyish-green when fresh and dry, turning salad-green when moist, and gradually turning chestnut brown after storage. The upper cortex is 25–40 μm thick. Phyllidia are common along the margins, and the photobiont layer is composed of more or less spherical cells. The medulla is mostly white, with a dark brown lower part.

Apothecia are absent, sparse, or common, with a rufous-brown disc. The hymenium is colourless and intensely IKI+ blue. Proper ascospores are hyaline, non-septate, and regularly elongate to ellipsoid.

== Chemistry ==
The species tests negative for UV, C, K, KC, and Pd spot test reactions. Thin-layer chromatography reveals the presence of vicanicin as a major compound, along with 3–4 unidentified terpenoids. High-performance liquid chromatography also indicates vicanicin as a major compound, with occasional trace amounts of norvicanicin.

== Distribution and habitat ==
Pannaria minutiphylla is common in Victoria and Tasmania, Australia. In New Zealand, it is widespread throughout both the North and South Islands, and also found in the Auckland Islands and Campbell Island. The species grows on trunks of various phorophytes and occasionally on rocks or leaves.
