= Gibbosporina mascarena =

Scientific classification
- Domain: Eukaryota
- Kingdom: Fungi
- Division: Ascomycota
- Class: Lecanoromycetes
- Order: Peltigerales
- Family: Pannariaceae
- Genus: Gibbosporina
- Species: G. mascarena

Binomial name
- Gibbosporina mascarena Elvebakk, S.G.Hong & P.M.Jørg. (2016)

Species of lichen in the family Pannariaceae

Gibbosporina mascarena is a species of foliose lichen in the family Pannariaceae. It was described as a new species in 2016 by Arve Elvebakk, Soon Gyu Hong, and Per Magnus Jørgensen. The specific epithet mascarena ("from the Mascarenes") refers to Réunion and Mauritius. The lichen occurs in Réunion, Mauritius, and Sri Lanka, where it grows on tree trunks in tropical forests at altitudes of 500–700 m (1,600–2,300 ft).
