= Gibbosporina nitida =

Scientific classification
- Domain: Eukaryota
- Kingdom: Fungi
- Division: Ascomycota
- Class: Lecanoromycetes
- Order: Peltigerales
- Family: Pannariaceae
- Genus: Gibbosporina
- Species: G. nitida

Binomial name
- Gibbosporina nitida Elvebakk, S.G.Hong & P.M.Jørg. (2016)

Species of lichen in the family Pannariaceae

Gibbosporina nitida is a species of foliose lichen in the family Pannariaceae. It was described as a new species in 2016 by Arve Elvebakk, Soon Gyu Hong, and Per Magnus Jørgensen. The specific epithet nitida, derived from the Latin nitidus ("glossy"), refers to the lustrous upper lobe surfaces. The lichen occurs in northeast Australia, Papua New Guinea, the Philippines, and Fiji.
