= Gibbosporina sphaerospora =

Scientific classification
- Domain: Eukaryota
- Kingdom: Fungi
- Division: Ascomycota
- Class: Lecanoromycetes
- Order: Peltigerales
- Family: Pannariaceae
- Genus: Gibbosporina
- Species: G. sphaerospora

Binomial name
- Gibbosporina sphaerospora Elvebakk & S.G.Hong (2016)

Species of lichen in the family Pannariaceae

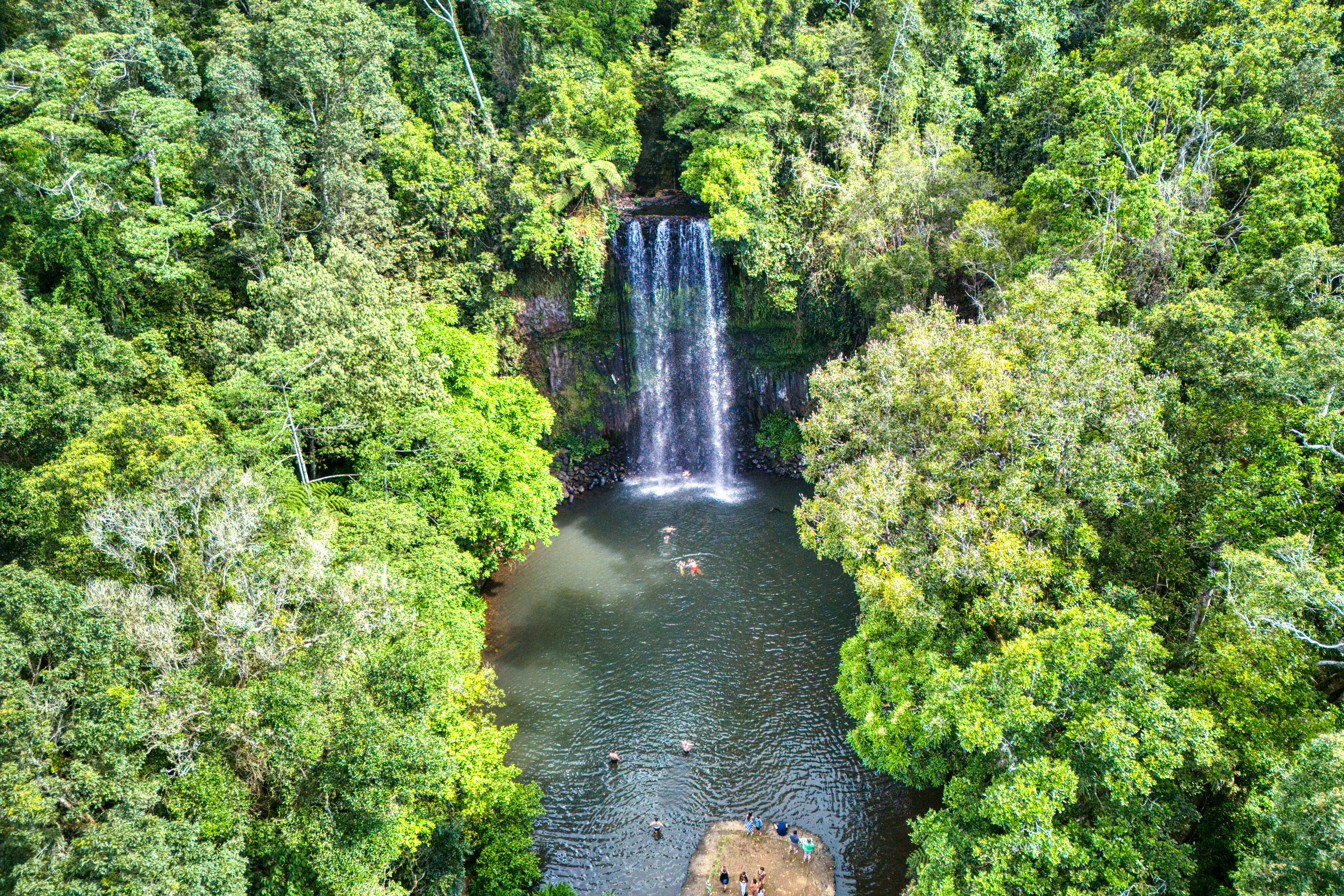
Millaa Millaa Falls

Gibbosporina sphaerospora is a species of foliose lichen in the family Pannariaceae. It was described as a new species in 2016 by Arve Elvebakk and Soon Gyu Hong. The type was collected from Millaa Millaa Falls in Queensland, Australia, where it was found growing on fallen branches in a remnant rainforest near the falls. The specific epithet sphaerospora, which combines the Greek sphaero ("globose") with spora, refers to the spherical shape of the spores. The lichen occurs in Australia, Fiji, and Papua New Guinea.
