= Gibbosporina leptospora =

Scientific classification
- Domain: Eukaryota
- Kingdom: Fungi
- Division: Ascomycota
- Class: Lecanoromycetes
- Order: Peltigerales
- Family: Pannariaceae
- Genus: Gibbosporina
- Species: G. leptospora

Binomial name
- Gibbosporina leptospora Elvebakk (2016)

Species of lichen in the family Pannariaceae

Gibbosporina leptospora is a species of foliose lichen in the family Pannariaceae. It was described as a new species in 2016 by Norwegian lichenologist Arve Elvebakk. The specific epithet leptospora, which combines the Greek lepto ("thin") with spore, refers to the thin perispore (outer spore covering). The lichen occurs in northeast Australia, Papua New Guinea, Fiji, and New Caledonia.
