= Gibbosporina amphorella =

Scientific classification
- Domain: Eukaryota
- Kingdom: Fungi
- Division: Ascomycota
- Class: Lecanoromycetes
- Order: Peltigerales
- Family: Pannariaceae
- Genus: Gibbosporina
- Species: G. amphorella

Binomial name
- Gibbosporina amphorella Elvebakk & S.G.Hong (2016)

Species of lichen in the family Pannariaceae

Gibbosporina amphorella is a species of foliose lichen in the family Pannariaceae. It was described as a new species in 2016 by Arve Elvebakk and Soon Gyu Hong. The specific epithet, derived from the Latin amphora ("urn") and ella- (a diminutive suffix), refers to the small pycnidia (measuring 0.2 by 0.2 mm), that are shaped like urns. The lichen is only known to occur in a small subtropical forested area in New Caledonia.
