= Pannaria planiuscula =

Scientific classification
- Kingdom: Fungi
- Division: Ascomycota
- Class: Lecanoromycetes
- Order: Peltigerales
- Family: Pannariaceae
- Genus: Pannaria
- Species: P. planiuscula

Binomial name
- Pannaria planiuscula P.M.Jørg. (2003)

Species of lichen

Pannaria planiuscula is a species of bark-dwelling in the family Pannariaceae. It is a flattened, rosette-forming lichen found in eastern and southern Africa, and the island Réunion.

== Taxonomy ==
Pannaria planiuscula was formally described in 2003 by the Norwegian lichenologist Per Magnus Jørgensen. The species epithet planiuscula refers to its flattened thallus (body). It is related to the widespread tropical species Pannaria rubiginosa, but differs in several significant characteristics. It belongs to a group of closely related species within the genus Pannaria, including the Indian P. complanata and the Himalayan P. emodi.

== Description ==
Pannaria planiuscula forms flattened rosettes up to 5 cm in diameter. It has a subcrustose (somewhat crust-like) thallus with radiating marginal lobes that extend up to 2 mm in width. These lobes are 150–200 μm thick with a distinct paraplectenchymatous upper cortex (a tissue composed of cells arranged in a jigsaw puzzle-like pattern) that is 30–40 μm wide. The prothallus (the initial growth of the lichen) is inconspicuous.

The upper surface has a characteristic greyish blue colouration. In the central portions of the thallus, small squamules (scale-like structures) to lobules develop, and these areas typically bear numerous apothecia (disc-shaped fruiting bodies).

The apothecia reach up to 1 mm in diameter with a distinct thalline margin and a brownish disc. The hymenium (fertile tissue layer) is about 100 μm high and turns blue when exposed to iodine, but only in the vicinity of the asci (spore-producing cells). The asci lack internal amyloid structures that are present in some related species. The ascospores are simple, colourless, ellipsoid, and measure 10–12 by 5–6 μm.

Unlike some related species, all chemical spot tests (PD, K, C) are negative, and no secondary metabolites (lichen products) are detected by thin-layer chromatography.

== Habitat and distribution ==
Pannaria planiuscula is a corticolous species, meaning it grows on tree bark. It has been found in moist ravines at moderate altitudes in eastern Africa (Kenya) and South Africa. The type specimen was collected in the Cherangani Hills of Kenya's Rift Valley Province, growing on a tree near a rivulet in a densely wooded ravine at an elevation of approximately 2,500–2,700 ft (760–820 m). Additional specimens have been collected from the slopes of Table Mountain in South Africa, particularly in Blinkwater Ravine where it was found growing on Eucalyptus trees.

The disjunct distribution between Kenya and South Africa suggests the species may be more widespread throughout eastern Africa than currently documented, but further collection and study are needed to determine its full range. It was reported from the remote tropical island Réunion in 2011.
