= Gibbosporina papillospora =

Scientific classification
- Domain: Eukaryota
- Kingdom: Fungi
- Division: Ascomycota
- Class: Lecanoromycetes
- Order: Peltigerales
- Family: Pannariaceae
- Genus: Gibbosporina
- Species: G. papillospora

Binomial name
- Gibbosporina papillospora Elvebakk (2016)

Species of lichen

Gibbosporina papillospora is a species of foliose lichen in the family Pannariaceae. It was described as a new species in 2016 by Norwegian lichenologist Arve Elvebakk. The type was collected from Mount Mariveles (Bataan province, Philippines) by American botanist Elmer Drew Merrill in 1908. The specific epithet nitida, derived from the Latin papilla ("small wart" or "nipple"), refers to the irregular surface of the perispore (the outer covering of the spore). The lichen is only known to occur in the Philippines.
