= Calopadia imshaugii =

Scientific classification
- Kingdom: Fungi
- Division: Ascomycota
- Class: Lecanoromycetes
- Order: Lecanorales
- Family: Ectolechiaceae
- Genus: Calopadia
- Species: C. imshaugii

Binomial name
- Calopadia imshaugii Common & Lücking (2011)

Species of lichen-forming fungus

Calopadia imshaugii is a species of crustose lichen in the family Ectolechiaceae. It was described from Florida. It has brown apothecia (fruiting bodies) with a coarse, white pruinose (powdery) coating, and its muriform (multi-chambered) ascospores are often produced two per ascus (sometimes one or three), which is unusual in Calopadia.

== Taxonomy ==
Calopadia imshaugii was described as a new species in 2011 by Ralph Common and Robert Lücking, based on material collected in Fakahatchee Strand Preserve State Park (Collier County, Florida). The holotype (the single specimen designated as the name-bearing type; Common 7322F) was gathered in April 1997 along the Scenic Drive (CR 837) just past bend near gate 14 in second-growth habitat. It is deposited in the herbarium of the Michigan State University Museum (MSC).

The species is named in honor of the American lichenologist Henry Imshaug. The species stands out within Calopadia because its asci can contain more than one ellipsoid ascospore, whereas most species in the genus have single-spored asci. Among the few multi-spored species, the spores are usually narrow and oblong rather than ellipsoid.

== Description ==
The thallus grows on bark (corticolous), typically 0.5–3 cm across and about 0.5–3 cm across and about 30–50 μm (micrometres) thick. It is continuous in the center but breaks into dispersed, irregular patches toward the edges. The surface is uneven and ranges from white to pale gray. The photobiont (the photosynthetic partner) is a green alga with chlorococcoid cells.

The apothecia are rounded and sessile (sitting directly on the thallus), 0.4–0.8 mm in diameter. The disk is brown and coarsely white-pruinose (powdery), and the margin is conspicuous and pale gray to cream-colored. Microscopically, the excipulum is colorless (about 50–100 μm wide) and the hypothecium is brown (about 20–40 μm high); the apothecial base is dull brown. The hymenium is colorless and about 100–130 μm high, with paraphyses that are unbranched to slightly branched.

The asci are about 90–100 × 20–30 μm and contain (1–)2(–3) ellipsoid, muriform ascospores per ascus. The spores measure about 50–80 × 15–23 μm. The species also forms campylidia (about 0.5–1 mm broad and 1–1.5 mm long) with a hood-shaped lobe that is dark gray with a paler apex and pruinose. The conidia are filiform with a clavate tip, 7–15-septate (divided by internal walls), and about 70–90 × 1.5–2 μm. All spot tests were negative.

== Habitat and distribution ==
Calopadia imshaugii is known from several collections in Florida, where it grows on the bark of small twigs of unidentified trees. In addition to the type locality in Collier County, collections were cited from the Homestead area in Miami-Dade County (near SW 388th Street, east of Old Dixie Highway).
