= Badimia vezdana =

Scientific classification
- Kingdom: Fungi
- Division: Ascomycota
- Class: Lecanoromycetes
- Order: Lecanorales
- Family: Ramalinaceae
- Genus: Badimia
- Species: B. vezdana

Binomial name
- Badimia vezdana Lücking, Farkas & V.Wirth (2011)

Species of lichen-forming fungus

Badimia vezdana is a species of foliicolous (leaf-dwelling) lichen in the family Ramalinaceae. It is found in the shady understory of undisturbed lowland rainforests in the Neotropics. The lichen is characterized by its pale bluish-grey colour and distinctive yellow to orange-yellow apothecia. It was described as new to science in 2011 by lichenologists Robert Lücking, Edit Farkas, and Volkmar Wirth.

== Taxonomy ==
Badimia vezdana was first described as a new species by Robert Lücking, Edit Farkas, and Wolkmar Wirth in 2023. The type specimen was collected by the first author in June 1988 from Tortuguero National Park in Costa Rica. The species was initially believed to be conspecific with the paleotropical B. galbinea, but further studies confirmed significant differences between the two, leading to the designation of a separate name for the Neotropical populations. The species epithet vezdana honours the influential lichen taxonomist Antonín Vězda.

== Description ==
Badimia vezdana is a foliicolous lichen, meaning it grows on leaves, with a thallus that is 10–40 mm across and 15–25 μm thick. It is characterized by its pale bluish-grey colour, strongly verrucose surface, and hemispherical verrucae filled with yellow crystals. The apothecia, or fruiting bodies, are rounded and measure 0.3–0.8 mm in diameter and 150–220 μm high. They are a bright yellow to orange-yellow colour, with a distinct, slightly prominent margin.

In contrast, the paleotropical species B. galbinea has an irregularly laciniate thallus, producing scattered and irregular pale yellow verrucae, and ferrugineous-orange apothecia.

== Habitat and distribution ==
Badimia vezdana is restricted to the Neotropics, found exclusively in the shady understory of undisturbed lowland rainforests. It has been documented in Costa Rica, Panama, Colombia, Guyana, and Brazil.
