= Gibbosporina didyma =

Scientific classification
- Domain: Eukaryota
- Kingdom: Fungi
- Division: Ascomycota
- Class: Lecanoromycetes
- Order: Peltigerales
- Family: Pannariaceae
- Genus: Gibbosporina
- Species: G. didyma

Binomial name
- Gibbosporina didyma Elvebakk, S.G.Hong & P.M.Jørg. (2016)

Species of lichen in the family Pannariaceae

Gibbosporina didyma is a rare species of foliose lichen in the family Pannariaceae. It was described as a new species in 2016 by Arve Elvebakk, Soon Gyu Hong, and Per Magnus Jørgensen. The specific epithet didyma ("in pairs"), refers to the thallus being divided into a prominent cyanobiont in addition to the dominant chlorobiont, as well as to cephalodia that are sometimes divided by the developing apothecia of chlorobionts. The lichen is known from only two locations on Réunion and Mauritius; both are tropical forests at moderate altitudes, 500–600 m (1,600–2,000 ft).
