= Pannaria squamulosa =

Scientific classification
- Kingdom: Fungi
- Division: Ascomycota
- Class: Lecanoromycetes
- Order: Peltigerales
- Family: Pannariaceae
- Genus: Pannaria
- Species: P. squamulosa

Binomial name
- Pannaria squamulosa P.M.Jørg. (2003)

Species of lichen

Pannaria squamulosa is a species of lichen-forming fungus in the family Pannariaceae. It is a distinctive squamulose (scale-forming) lichen occurring in South Africa and Réunion.

== Taxonomy ==
Pannaria squamulosa was formally described in 2003 by the Norwegian lichenologist Per Magnus Jørgensen. The species epithet squamulosa refers to its characteristic squamulose (composed of small scales) thallus structure. The holotype specimen was collected from the Diepvalle Forest Reserve in the Knysna Division of South Africa's Cape Province, where it was found growing on Cunonia capensis trees.

The species is related to Pannaria complanata, a paleotropical species, but differs in lacking the elongated marginal lobes of that species and in its chemical composition. It may also share some relationship with Parmeliella mariana, though that species has different ascus (spore-producing cell) structures and marginal lobes. Another superficially similar species is the South American Pannaria coeruleonigricans, which differs in having a more prominent, fibrous prothallus and different chemical composition.

== Description ==
Pannaria squamulosa forms an effuse (spreading) thallus up to 4 cm in diameter. The thallus consists entirely of incised, grey-blue to olivaceous squamules (scale-like structures) up to 3 mm wide and about 150 μm thick. The upper surface has a well-developed paraplectenchymatous cortex (a tissue composed of cells arranged in a jigsaw puzzle-like pattern). These squamules rest upon a well-developed, crustaceous, blackish prothallus (the initial growth of the lichen), which creates a distinctive contrast with the grey-blue squamules.

Apothecia (fruiting bodies) are common, particularly in the central parts of the thallus, and can reach up to 1.5 mm in diameter. They have a flat, brown disc and a squamulose, grey-brown thalline margin up to 150 μm thick. The hymenium (fertile tissue layer) is about 100 μm high and stains blue with iodine in the vicinity of the asci, which lack internal amyloid structures. The asci contain eight spores each, and the ascospores are colourless, simple, subglobose (almost spherical), measuring 10–15 by 8–10 μm, with a smooth surface. All chemical spot tests (PD, K, C) are negative, and no secondary metabolites (lichen substances) are detected by thin-layer chromatography.

== Habitat and distribution ==
Pannaria squamulosa is a corticolous species, meaning it grows on tree bark. As of its description in 2003, it was known only from forests in the Cape Province of South Africa, including the type locality at Diepvalle Forest Reserve and the Ysternek Nature Reserve. It was found growing on native trees including Cunonia capensis. The species appears to prefer humid forest environments in the Cape region. Its restricted distribution may indicate that it is part of the distinctive Cape floristic element, which includes many endemic species. Its known range was expanded considerably when it was reported from the remote tropical island Réunion in 2011. There, it was found growing on bark and overgrowing mosses growing on rocks.
