= Calopadia schomerae =

Scientific classification
- Kingdom: Fungi
- Division: Ascomycota
- Class: Lecanoromycetes
- Order: Lecanorales
- Family: Ectolechiaceae
- Genus: Calopadia
- Species: C. schomerae

Binomial name
- Calopadia schomerae Seavey & J.Seavey (2011)
- Type locality: Everglades National Park, Florida

Species of lichen-forming fungus

Calopadia schomerae is a species of lichen in the family Ectolechiaceae. It forms a thin, grayish-green crust on tree bark and living leaves. The species is known only from Everglades National Park in southern Florida, where it grows in pond apple swamps and shaded hardwood hammocks.

== Taxonomy ==
Calopadia schomerae was described as a new species in 2011 by Frederick Seavey and Jean Seavey from collections made in Everglades National Park (Miami-Dade County, Florida). The type collection (holotype) was gathered near Ficus Pond on the bark of pond apple (Annona glabra) at about 1 m (3 ft) elevation. The species is named in honor of Barbara Schomer, a friend and colleague of the authors who contributed to natural history work, including lichenology.

In their original treatment, the authors noted that the species can be confused in the field with other gray-green members of Calopadia, particularly when it grows on leaves in humid forests, where the apothecia (fruiting bodies) can appear only weakly dusted with white pruina. They separated C. schomerae from similar species by its combination of a gray-green thallus, a pale brown layer beneath the hymenium (the hypothecium), typically pruinose apothecia, and a thallus that fluoresces orange under ultraviolet light due to xanthones.

== Description ==
The thallus forms a thin, crust-like coating on bark or living leaves. It is grayish-green to greenish-gray, usually continuous, and smooth to slightly warty, sometimes bordered by a discontinuous white prothallus. The photosynthetic partner (photobiont) is a chlorococcoid green alga.

The apothecia are round and sessile (sitting directly on the thallus), with orangish-brown to brown discs that are typically about 0.5–0.75 mm wide and often dusted with a white pruina, especially when young or exposed. The asci contain a single spore. The ascospores are hyaline and muriform (divided into many small chambers by internal cross-walls), measuring about 55–75 × 20–22 μm. The lichen also produces campylidia—hood-like asexual structures—with filiform (threadlike), strongly curved, multiseptate conidia.

Chemical tests reported in the original description were negative, but thin-layer chromatography detected two xanthone compounds, and the thallus fluoresces dull to bright orange under ultraviolet light.

== Habitat and distribution ==
Calopadia schomerae is known from the northeastern portion of Everglades National Park in southern Florida. It occurs both corticolously (on bark) and foliicolously (on living leaves). Corticolous material is the most frequent and is well developed in pond apple swamps (including on Annona glabra), but it has also been collected along a dry, abandoned roadbed in brighter, less humid conditions. Foliicolous collections have been reported from shaded hammock interiors with high humidity, including on leaves of Eugenia.

The authors observed that habitat conditions can influence the appearance of the apothecia: specimens from the drier, brighter roadbed commonly have more strongly pruinose discs, whereas those from humid, shaded hammocks often show only a light scattering of pruina, which may contribute to misidentification as similar species.
