= Gibbosporina elixii =

Scientific classification
- Domain: Eukaryota
- Kingdom: Fungi
- Division: Ascomycota
- Class: Lecanoromycetes
- Order: Peltigerales
- Family: Pannariaceae
- Genus: Gibbosporina
- Species: G. elixii

Binomial name
- Gibbosporina elixii Elvebakk, S.G.Hong & P.M.Jørg. (2016)

Species of lichen in the family Pannariaceae

Gibbosporina elixii is a species of foliose lichen in the family Pannariaceae. It is endemic to Queensland, Australia. The lichen was described as a new species in 2016 by Arve Elvebakk, Soon Gyu Hong, and Per Magnus Jørgensen. The specific epithet honours Australian lichenologist John Alan Elix. He collected the type from Mossman Gorge National Park, where he found it growing on the base of a tree in a tropical rainforest along Mossman River. It has also been found in the Cardwell Range.
