= Gibbosporina acuminata =

Scientific classification
- Domain: Eukaryota
- Kingdom: Fungi
- Division: Ascomycota
- Class: Lecanoromycetes
- Order: Peltigerales
- Family: Pannariaceae
- Genus: Gibbosporina
- Species: G. acuminata

Binomial name
- Gibbosporina acuminata Elvebakk (2016)

Species of lichen

Gibbosporina acuminata is a species of foliose lichen in the family Pannariaceae. It was described as a new species in 2016 by Norwegian lichenologist Arve Elvebakk. The specific epithet, derived from the Latin acumen ("sharp point"), refers to the spiked bumps (gibbae) on the spore covering (perispore). It occurs in the tropical forests of Queensland, Australia, and the Philippines.
