= Pannaria emodii =

Scientific classification
- Kingdom: Fungi
- Division: Ascomycota
- Class: Lecanoromycetes
- Order: Peltigerales
- Family: Pannariaceae
- Genus: Pannaria
- Species: P. emodii

Binomial name
- Pannaria emodii P.M.Jørg. (2001)

Species of lichen

Pannaria emodii is a species of corticolous (bark-dwelling), squamulose (scaley) to foliose (leafy) lichen in the family Pannariaceae. It was formally described as a new species in 2001 by the Norwegian lichenologist Per Magnus Jørgensen. The type specimen was collected in 1967 by Hiroshi Harada and colleagues from Shodu-Barshong (Bhutan) at an altitude between 3,500 and 3,800 m (11,500 and 12,500 ft).

The lichen has a rosette-shaped thallus up to 5 cm (2 in) in diameter with peripheral lobes up to about 3 mm wide. Its ascospores are simple (i.e., without any septa), more or less spherical and colourless, and measure 10–12 by 6–8 μm. The thallus does not show any reactions to standard chemical spot tests, and no lichen products were detected using thin-layer chromatography. Pannaria emodii is found in the eastern Himalayas with a geographic range extending from Bhutan to Sichuan, China. In India, Pannaria emodii often associates with moss genus Hyophila.
