= Badimia multiseptata =

Scientific classification
- Kingdom: Fungi
- Division: Ascomycota
- Class: Lecanoromycetes
- Order: Lecanorales
- Family: Ramalinaceae
- Genus: Badimia
- Species: B. multiseptata

Binomial name
- Badimia multiseptata Papong & Lücking (2011)

Species of lichen

Badimia multiseptata is a species of lichen in the family Ramalinaceae. Found exclusively in lowland rainforest environments of Thailand, it was described as new to science in 2011 by Khwanruan Papong and Robert Lücking. It is characterized by its vividly coloured apothecia and unique, campylidioid conidiomata.

== Taxonomy ==
Badimia multiseptata was first described by lichenologists Khwanruan Papong and Robert Lücking as a new species discovered in Thailand's Khao Yai National Park in December 2005. The species epithet multiseptata refers to the multiseptate ascospores (i.e., with many internal partitions, or septa), which distinguish this species from other members of the genus.

== Description ==
The thallus of Badimia multiseptata is continuous or irregularly dispersed, and pale greenish-grey in colour. The thallus surface is densely verrucose with white, wart-shaped verrucae. The photobiont is chlorococcoid. The apothecia are rounded, ranging from 0.4 to 0.8 mm in diameter, with a pale yellow to orange disc and a slightly prominent margin that is paler than the disc. The multiseptate ascospores are oblong to fusiform, colourless, and measure 25–32 by 4–5 μm.

Badimia multiseptata belongs to the pallidula species group, which has a non-crystalline excipulum and slightly translucent, gyalectoid apothecia. This species is morphologically similar to B. pallidula and B. polillensis but is differentiated by its multiseptate ascospores, which are comparatively larger. In contrast, B. pallidula and B. polillensis have ascospores with three septa, while those of B. verrucosa are somewhat muriform.

Lichen products found in Badimia multiseptata include usnic acid and zeorin.

== Habitat and distribution ==
This lichen species has been observed in several collections from lowland rainforests in Thailand, including Nakhon Ratchasima, Chanthaburi, Loei, and Nakhon Si Thammarat provinces. It is typically found in shady understory environments, growing on leaves at an altitude of around 650 m (2,130 ft). Badimia multiseptata is one of only two Badimia species known to occur in Thailand; the other is B. xanthocampylidia.
