= Pannaria aotearoana =

Scientific classification
- Kingdom: Fungi
- Division: Ascomycota
- Class: Lecanoromycetes
- Order: Peltigerales
- Family: Pannariaceae
- Genus: Pannaria
- Species: P. aotearoana

Binomial name
- Pannaria aotearoana Elvebakk & Elix (2016)

Species of lichen

Pannaria aotearoana is a species of lichen in the family Pannariaceae, first described in 2016 by Arve Elvebakk and John Elix from a specimen found on a Coprosma linariifolia in the South Island of New Zealand.
