= Calopadia granulosa =

Scientific classification
- Kingdom: Fungi
- Division: Ascomycota
- Class: Lecanoromycetes
- Order: Lecanorales
- Family: Ectolechiaceae
- Genus: Calopadia
- Species: C. granulosa

Binomial name
- Calopadia granulosa Aptroot & M.Cáceres (2014)

Species of lichen-forming fungus

Calopadia granulosa is a species of corticolous (bark-dwelling), crustose lichen in the family Ectolechiaceae. Found in Brazil, it was formally described as a new species in 2014 by lichenologists André Aptroot and Marcela Cáceres. The type specimen was collected by the authors from the Parque Natural Municipal de Porto Velho (Rondônia), where it was found growing on the smooth bark of a tree in a park near a rainforest. The thallus of the lichen consists of a crust of pale greyish-green granules that lacks a prothallus. Its ascospores, which number one per ascus, are hyaline, ellipsoid, and muriform. They measure 33–38 by 10.5–13.0 μm; these are among the smallest ascospores found in the genus Calopadia.
