= Campylidium sommerfeltii =

Scientific classification
- Kingdom: Plantae
- Division: Bryophyta
- Class: Bryopsida
- Subclass: Bryidae
- Order: Hypnales
- Family: Amblystegiaceae
- Genus: Campylidium
- Species: C. sommerfeltii

Binomial name
- Campylidium sommerfeltii (Myrin) Ochyra

Species of moss

Campylidium sommerfeltii is a species of moss belonging to the family Amblystegiaceae.
