= Pannaria ramulosa =

Scientific classification
- Kingdom: Fungi
- Division: Ascomycota
- Class: Lecanoromycetes
- Order: Peltigerales
- Family: Pannariaceae
- Genus: Pannaria
- Species: P. ramulosa

Binomial name
- Pannaria ramulosa P.M.Jørg. (2001)

Species of lichen

Pannaria ramulosa is a species of corticolous (bark-dwelling), squamulose (scaly) to foliose (leafy) lichen in the family Pannariaceae. It was formally described as a new species in 2001 by the Norwegian lichenologist Per Magnus Jørgensen. Gustaf Einar Du Rietz collected the type specimen in 1927 from the Goenoeng Ardjoena (Pasuruan Regency, Indonesia). This rainforest lichen has a rounded thallus up to 5 cm (2 in) in diameter with thin, brownish lobes. It does not show any reactions to standard chemical spot tests, and no lichen products were detected using thin-layer chromatography. At the time of its original publication it was only known to occur at the type locality.
