= Pannaria formosana =

Scientific classification
- Kingdom: Fungi
- Division: Ascomycota
- Class: Lecanoromycetes
- Order: Peltigerales
- Family: Pannariaceae
- Genus: Pannaria
- Species: P. formosana

Binomial name
- Pannaria formosana P.M.Jørg. (2001)

Species of lichen

Pannaria formosana is a species of corticolous (bark-dwelling), squamulose (scaley) to foliose (leafy) lichen in the family Pannariaceae. Found in eastern Asia, it was formally described as a new species in 2001 by the Norwegian lichenologist Per Magnus Jørgensen. The type specimen was collected in February, 1965 by Syo Kurokawa from Chinsueiin Pass, (Taitung Prefecture, Taiwan).

The lichen forms brown, circular patches up to about 5 cm (2 in) in diameter with lobes up to 2 mm wide. These lobes have whitish, pruina-like isidioid secondary lobules. Apothecia occur rarely in this species, and mature ascospores have not been found. The PD+ (orange) chemical spot test reaction indicates the presence of parietin, a lichen product. Pannaria formosana is found in the lowland forests of southern Taiwan and Honshu, Japan, although the author suggests a potentially wider distribution in the islands of Southeast Asia.
