= Edit Éva Farkas =

Hungarian lichenologist

- Born: 1 May 1959 (age 67); Budapest
- Education: Eötvös Loránd University
- Spouse: László Sándor Lőkös
- Children: 2
- Scientific career
- Fields: lichenology
- Workplaces: Institute of Ecology and Botany, Centre for Ecological Research
- Thesis: Lichenológiai vizsgálatok Budapesten éa a Pilis bioszféra Rezervátumban - elterjedés, bioindikáció (Lichenological investigations in the Pilis Biosphere Reserve in Budapest - distribution, bioindication) (1991)
- Author abbrev. (botany): Farkas

Edit Éva Farkas is a Hungarian lichenologist and mycologist at the Institute of Ecology and Botany, Centre for Ecological Research in Hungary. She is the author of at least 14 taxon names and author or co-author of over 148 scientific publications.

== Education and personal life ==
She studied at Eötvös Loránd University public research university in Budapest. She was awarded an MSc degree in 1982, with a thesis about the effects of air pollution on lichens, supervised by Klára Verseghy and her doctorate in 1987 for the thesis Lichenológiai vizsgálatok Budapesten éa a Pilis bioszféra Rezervátumban - elterjedés, bioindikáció (Lichenological investigations in the Pilis Biosphere Reserve in Budapest - distribution, bioindication). In 2013 she was awarded Dr. habil by Eötvös Loránd University. In 2016, she defended her academic doctoral title to become a Doctor of the Hungarian Academy of Sciences (DSc); her thesis was titled A bioindikáció, a biodiverzitás és a kémiai diverzitás összefüggései a lichenológiában. Akadémiai nagydoktori értekezés ('Bioindication, biodiversity and chemical diversity – lichenological aspects').

She is married to László Sándor Lőkös, who is also a lichenologist. They have two children together.

== Research career ==
Since 1982 she has worked the Institute of Ecology and Botany, Centre for Ecological Research, Vácrátót, Hungary being promoted from a junior to senior researcher. She was part of the Hungarian Academy of Sciences between 1982 and 2011.

She is a lichenologist, predominantly a taxonomist using molecular, morphological and chemotaxonomic methods, and has identified many new species and taxa as well as new nomenclature combinations. Throughout her career she has also undertaken fieldwork especially on the effects of the environment, especially pollution, on lichens around Europe. During the 1980s she undertook fieldwork on foliose lichens in the (now) Czech Republic and Tanzania. She has also studied other tropical lichens. In the 1990s and early 2000s she worked extensively on crustose lichens. She spent 1992 at the Natural History Museum, London, collaborating with David J. Galloway and others. In addition, her research concerns secondary metabolites within the lichen symbiosis, adopting new analytical methodologies as they became available during her career. Together with Lőkös, they have characterised 17 new genera and 139 new taxa, and proposed more than 120 new nomenclature combinations. Edit Farkas is publishing the exsiccata Lichenes delicati exsiccati editae in memoriam Antonín Vězda (1920–2008).

== Honours ==
Calopadia editiae is a leaf-dwelling lichen that was named in her honour by former mentor Antonín Vězda. In 2016 she was awarded the Boros Ádám Award jointly with Lőkös for their contribution to mapping and identification methods of lichens in Hungary, as well as teaching younger scientists.

== Scientific publications ==
Farkas is the author or co-author of at least 148 scientific publications concerning lichens and lichenologists. The most significant include:

- Juan Carlos Zamora, Måns Svensson, Roland Kirschner, Ibai Olariaga ... E Farkas ... and others (2018) Considerations and consequences of allowing DNA sequence data as types of fungal taxa. IMA fungus 9 (1) 167–175.
- HT Lumbsch, T Ahti, S Altermann, GA De Paz, A Aptroot ... E Farkas ... and 98 others (2011) One hundred new species of lichenized fungi: a signature of undiscovered global diversity. Phytotaxa 18 (1), 1–127.
- K Molnár and E Farkas (2010) Current results on biological activities of lichen secondary metabolites: a review. Zeitschrift für Naturforschung C 65 (3-4), 157–173.
- EE Farkas, HJM Sipman (1993) Bibliography and checklist of foliicolous lichenized fungi up to 1992. Tropical Bryology 7 93-148
- E Farkas, L Lokos and K Verseghy (1985) Lichens as indicators of air pollution in the Budapest agglomeration. I. Air pollution map based on floristic data and heavy metal concentration measurements Acta Botanica Hungarica

== See also ==
- Category:Taxa named by Edit Éva Farkas
