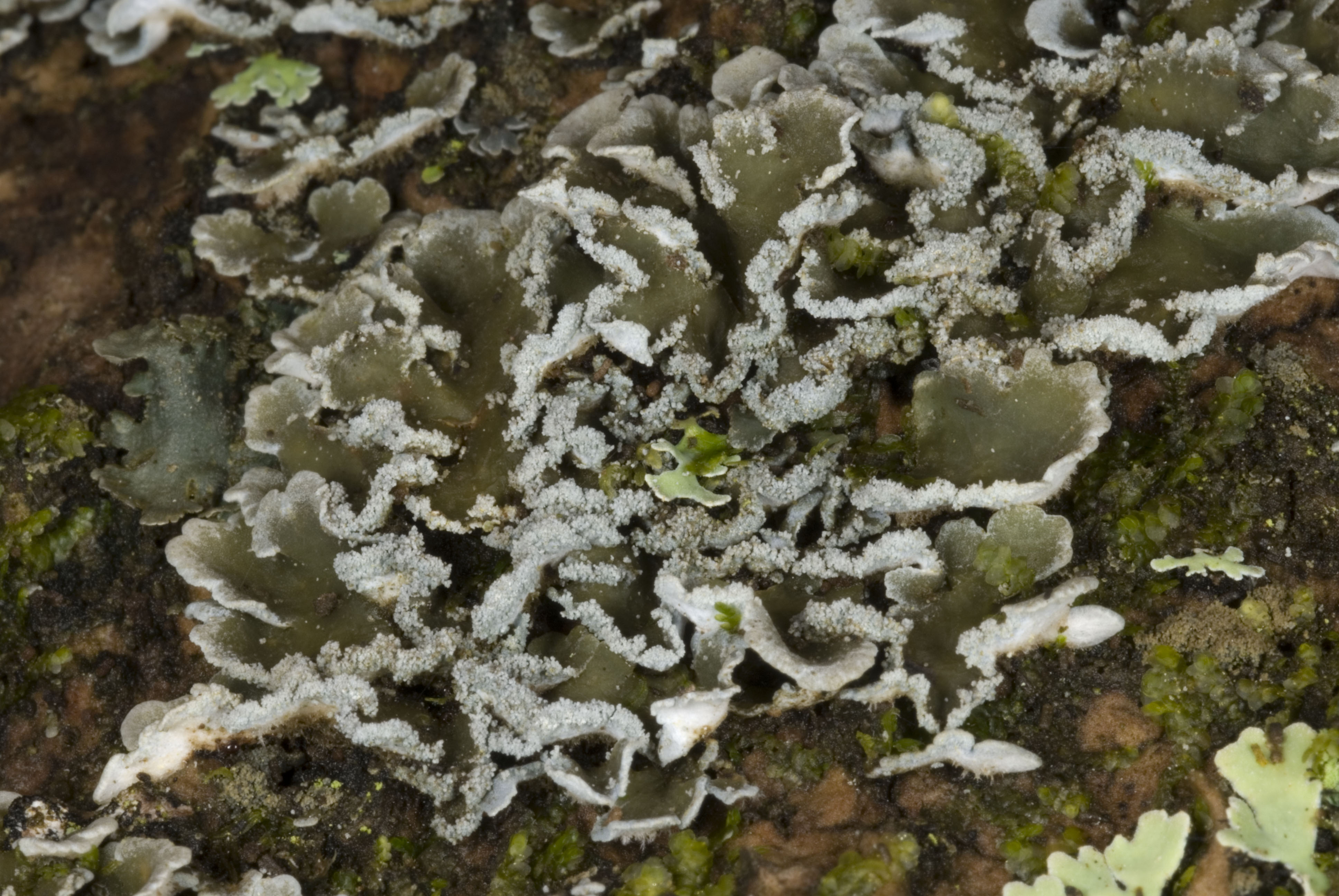

Scientific classification
- Kingdom: Fungi
- Division: Ascomycota
- Class: Lecanoromycetes
- Order: Peltigerales
- Family: Pannariaceae
- Genus: Pannaria
- Species: P. fulvescens

Binomial name
- Pannaria fulvescens (Mont.) Nyl. (1857)

Synonyms
- Parmelia fulvescens Mont. (1848)

= Pannaria fulvescens =

Species of lichen-forming fungus

Pannaria fulvescens is a species of foliose lichen in the family Pannariaceae. It occurs in French Polynesia and in New Zealand. Originally described in 1848 from specimens collected in Tahiti, this lichen forms overlapping lobes with a distinctive dull tawny-orange colour and scattered bluish-violet spots on the upper surface. It produces grey reproductive propagules (soredia) along the upturned, channeled lobe margins, with narrow linear lobes that broaden towards their rounded, wavy tips. In New Zealand, the species has been recorded from Northland, where it grows on both rock and tree bark in coastal forests, including on pōhutukawa trees and in kauri and mixed podocarp–broadleaf forests.

== Taxonomy ==
It was first formally described as a new species by the French mycologist Camille Montagne in 1848, from specimens collected in Tahiti. He published it as Parmelia? fulvescens, using a question mark to indicate uncertainty about its generic placement, and he noted that the material lacked fruiting bodies (no apothecia were seen). In his remarks, Montagne compared it with other Parmelia species (including P. conoplea and P. rubiginosa) and considered whether it might instead belong with Sticta, but rejected that placement because the lower surface lacked cyphellae. William Nylander transferred it to the genus Pannaria in 1857.

Veli Räsänen first described the variety Pannaria fulvescens var. lepidella in 1940. Later, in 1964, Syo Kurokawa elevated it to species status, citing the presence of soredia along the lobe margins—absent in P. fulvescens—and differences in lobe width as distinguishing features.

== Description ==
In Montagne's original account, Pannaria fulvescens is a foliose lichen with overlapping, somewhat membranous to cartilaginous lobes and a smooth upper surface. The thallus is described as dull tawny-fulvous in colour, with scattered bluish-violet spotting, and it produces grey soredia on the upturned, channelled lobe margins.

The lobes are narrow and linear for much of their length, but broaden towards the tips, which are rounded and wavy. Montagne reported the thallus divisions as reaching about 4 cm from the centre, with individual lobe segments about 3–4 mm wide, widening to over 1 cm near the periphery. He did not observe any fruiting bodies, and in his remarks he contrasted the species with superficially similar Sticta lichens by stating that the lower surface lacks cyphellae; he also stated that it lacks a felted underside (tomentum).

== Habitat and distribution ==
In New Zealand, Pannaria fulvescens has been recorded from Northland, including the eastern Bay of Islands and the Kawerua area of western Northland (defined by Hayward and Hayward as the coastal tract between the mouths of the Wairau and Waipoua Rivers, extending about 6 km inland).

In the eastern Bay of Islands it has been collected both on rock and on tree bark, including exposed cliff habitats and pōhutukawa bark, as well as in low teatree heath and mixed kānuka–coastal forest vegetation. On pōhutukawa, it was reported from the darker, moister parts of the lower trunk among other foliose lichens such as Collema, Pseudocyphellaria aurata and Sticta subcoriacea. It was also recorded from shaded, damp cliff faces, where it occurred with Leptogium azureum and Pseudocyphellaria crocata, and it forms part of the foliose lichen flora reported from mixed kānuka and regenerating coastal forest patches.

At Kawerua, the species was recorded on bark in both kauri forest and mixed podocarp–broadleaf forest (mixed forest). The authors describe the mixed forest of Waipoua Forest inland from Kawerua as supporting a diverse epiphytic flora on bark; in this habitat, foliose lichens are dominated by Pseudocyphellaria and Psoroma, with Pannaria among the other common foliose genera.
