= Pannarin =

Chemical compound found in some lichens

Names
- IUPAC name 8-chloro-9-hydroxy-3-methoxy-1,4,7-trimethyl-6-oxobenzo[b][1,4]benzodioxepine-10-carbaldehyde
- Other names 2-chloro-3-hydroxy-8-methoxy-1,6,9-trimethyl-11-oxo-11H-dibenzo[b,e][1,4]dioxepine-4-carbaldehyde

Identifiers
CAS Number	55609-84-2
3D model (JSmol)	Interactive image
ChEBI	CHEBI:144185
ChEMBL	ChEMBL285415
ChemSpider	142906
PubChem CID	162780
CompTox Dashboard (EPA)	DTXSID50204157
- InChI: InChI=1S/C18H15ClO6/c1-7-5-11(23-4)8(2)16-15(7)24-17-10(6-20)14(21)13(19)9(3)12(17)18(22)25-16/h5-6,21H,1-4H3 Key: LVGKNESDSKGROR-UHFFFAOYSA-N
- SMILES: CC1=CC(=C(C2=C1OC3=C(C(=C(C(=C3C(=O)O2)C)Cl)O)C=O)C)OC

Properties
Chemical formula	C_{18}H_{15}ClO_{6}
Molar mass	362.76 g·mol^{−1}
Appearance	clear needle-like crystals
Melting point	216–217 °C (421–423 °F; 489–490 K)

Structure
Crystal structure	monoclinic
Space group	P21/c
Lattice constant	a = 4.3010 Å, b = 22.832 Å, c = 16.531 Å
Lattice volume (V)	1616.9 ± 0.5 Å^{3}
Formula units (Z)	4
- Except where otherwise noted, data are given for materials in their standard state (at 25 °C [77 °F], 100 kPa). Infobox references

Pannarin is an organic compound of the depsidone class, first isolated in 1941 from Japanese lichens of the genus Pannaria. It has the molecular formula C_{18}H_{15}ClO_{6} and forms clear needle-like crystals with a melting point of 216–217 °C (421–423 °F). Its chemical structure was initially proposed on the basis of degradative studies that broke the molecule down into simpler fragments, but this early assignment proved incorrect and was revised in the 1970s using a combination of spectroscopic analysis and chemical synthesis. The revised structure was confirmed by X-ray crystallography in 1991.

Laboratory studies have reported that pannarin inhibits growth and induces cell death in certain human cancer cell lines, and shows synergistic antimicrobial effects with some antibiotics against drug-resistant Staphylococcus aureus. It also displays complex behaviour under ultraviolet light, both promoting and limiting damage to biological molecules depending on conditions, and can reduce symptoms of tobacco mosaic virus infection in experimental treatments of tobacco leaves. In nature, pannarin occurs in various lichen species across several genera, including Pannaria, Psoroma, Megalospora and, more rarely, Buellia and Lepraria. Its presence is used as a taxonomic character in lichen systematics.

== History ==
Pannarin was first isolated as a chlorine-containing depsidone from Japanese specimens of the lichen Pannaria lanuginosa and related species by Itiro Yosioka in 1941. He assigned a tentative structure to pannarin in 1941 through degradative studies that broke the molecule down into simpler components. In his experiments pannarin was oxidised to an acid, which was then heated to give smaller fragments, including a phenol derivative whose structure he confirmed by synthesis; on this basis he proposed the structure 2-chloro-6-hydroxy-3-methoxy-1,4,8-trimethyl-11-oxo-11H-dibenzo[b,e][1,4]dioxepin-7-carbaldehyde. This structure placed the diaryl ether linkage next to the hydroxy group in ring B, an arrangement otherwise known at the time only from the depsidone variolaric acid. It was later shown to be incorrect.

In 1974, Jackman, Sargent, and Elix published a preliminary structural assignment for pannarin, followed by a full account in 1975 that is generally regarded as giving the correct structure. Huneck and Lamb published work on the related compound argopsin, which they showed could be produced by chlorinating pannarin. Blaser and Stoeckli-Evans later noted that the crystal structure of a vicanicin derivative provided indirect support for the structures of both argopsin and pannarin. The molecular structure was ultimately confirmed through X-ray crystallography in 1991.

Early taxonomic studies sometimes misidentified other lichen compounds as pannarin. For instance, during chemotaxonomic surveys of South American Pseudocyphellaria species in the 1970s, compounds initially thought to be pannarin were later identified as the related depsidones granulatin and chlorogranulatin.

== Properties ==
Pannarin is a member of the class of chemical compounds called depsidones. Its IUPAC name is 8-chloro-9-hydroxy-3-methoxy-1,4,7-trimethyl-6-oxobenzo[b][1,4]benzodioxepine-10-carbaldehyde. In the ultraviolet spectrum it shows two absorption maxima at 212 and 234 nanometres (nm). Its infrared spectrum has characteristic bands around 1720 cm^{−1} (carbonyl group), 1600 cm^{−1} (aromatic ring vibrations) and a broad band near 3500 cm^{−1} (hydroxyl group). Pannarin's molecular formula is C_{18}H_{15}ClO_{6}; it has a molecular mass of 362.75 grams per mole. In its purified crystalline form, it occurs as clear needles, with a melting point of 216–217 °C (421–423 °F). In microcrystallisation experiments, pannarin yields clusters of colourless needles that later change into aggregates of yellowish lamellae.

X-ray crystallographic analysis shows that pannarin crystallises in the monoclinic crystal system, space group P2_{1}/c, with four molecules per unit cell (Z = 4). The molecule has a folded conformation, with its two phenyl rings inclined at about 123.6° to each other. The central seven-membered dioxepin-11-one ring adopts a boat conformation, and there is an intramolecular hydrogen bond between the formyl group and the adjacent hydroxyl group.

== Bioactivity ==
In laboratory experiments, pannarin has been reported to inhibit the growth of human prostate carcinoma DU-145 cells in vitro. In melanoma cell lines, pannarin showed activity at concentrations of 12.54–25 μM, where it induced apoptosis through mechanisms that included DNA fragmentation and increased caspase-3 activity; at higher concentrations (50 μM), it instead triggered necrotic cell death. The authors linked these effects at least in part to the compound's ability to generate reactive oxygen species within cells.

Pannarin demonstrates moderate synergistic antimicrobial action against methicillin-resistant Staphylococcus aureus when combined with gentamicin, but shows antagonism with levofloxacin. Because pannarin did not induce membrane permeabilisation in S. aureus, the authors concluded that its action was likely directed at intracellular targets. In vitro tests on promastigote forms of three Leishmania strains showed that pannarin and its chlorinated derivative 1'-chloropannarin inhibited parasite growth at 50 μg/mL, whereas usnic acid was active at 25 μg/mL; in the same study only usnic acid was evaluated in a mouse model of cutaneous leishmaniasis.

When irradiated with ultraviolet light, pannarin can both damage and protect biological systems. Under ultraviolet light exposure, it can break down red blood cells through free radical mechanisms, particularly in the presence of oxygen and at higher temperatures. However, pannarin also demonstrates significant protective effects against UV damage – it can shield proteins from both UVA and UVB radiation damage more effectively than related compounds like 1'-chloropannarin and atranorin. The authors suggested that this dual behaviour reflects pannarin's ability to both absorb UV radiation and interact with reactive oxygen species.

In controlled experiments, when sprayed on tobacco leaves before tobacco mosaic virus infection, pannarin significantly reduced the symptoms of viral infection by decreasing both the number of necrotic lesions (by 93%) and their size. This protective effect appeared to work through a mechanism independent of the plant's usual salicylic acid or jasmonic acid defence pathways.

== Chemical synthesis ==
Jackman, Sargent and Elix used a combination of degradative, spectroscopic and synthetic work to revise the structure of pannarin. In their synthetic study, one key fragment was prepared from 2,5-xylenol methyl ether via bromination, Grignard reaction (carboxylation with CO_{2}) and nitration to give an o-bromo benzoate, while the other was obtained by selective demethylation of a tri-O-methyl toluene derivative to give a highly substituted phenol. These two fragments were joined by an Ullmann reaction to form a diaryl ether, which was then formylated to give an aldehyde corresponding to a degradation product of pannarin.

Further methanolysis and modification of this diaryl ether allowed them to prepare a synthetic degradation product that was identical (by NMR and mass spectrometry) to a compound obtained from natural pannarin. On this basis they reassigned pannarin's structure to 2-chloro-3-hydroxy-8-methoxy-1,6,9-trimethyl-11-oxo-11H-dibenzo[b,e][1,4]dioxepin-4-carbaldehyde, a formulation that is equivalent to the modern IUPAC name 8-chloro-9-hydroxy-3-methoxy-1,4,7-trimethyl-6-oxobenzo[b][1,4]benzodioxepine-10-carbaldehyde.

== Occurrence ==
Initially isolated from Pannaria lanuginosa in 1941, pannarin was later reported from several other Pannaria species, including P. fulvescens, P. lurida, P. pityrea and P. rubiginosa, as well as from Lecanora hercynica, Bombyliospora japonica and Erioderma chilense. It is also found in several Psoroma species.

Pannarin is rare in the genus Buellia, known to occur in only three species of the relatively large genus. It is even rarer in the genus Lepraria, known to occur only in the species Lepraria adhaerens, a leprose lichen that also contains smaller amounts of the biogenetically related accessory compounds dechloropannarin, norpannarin and hypopannarin.

Some pannarin-containing lichens
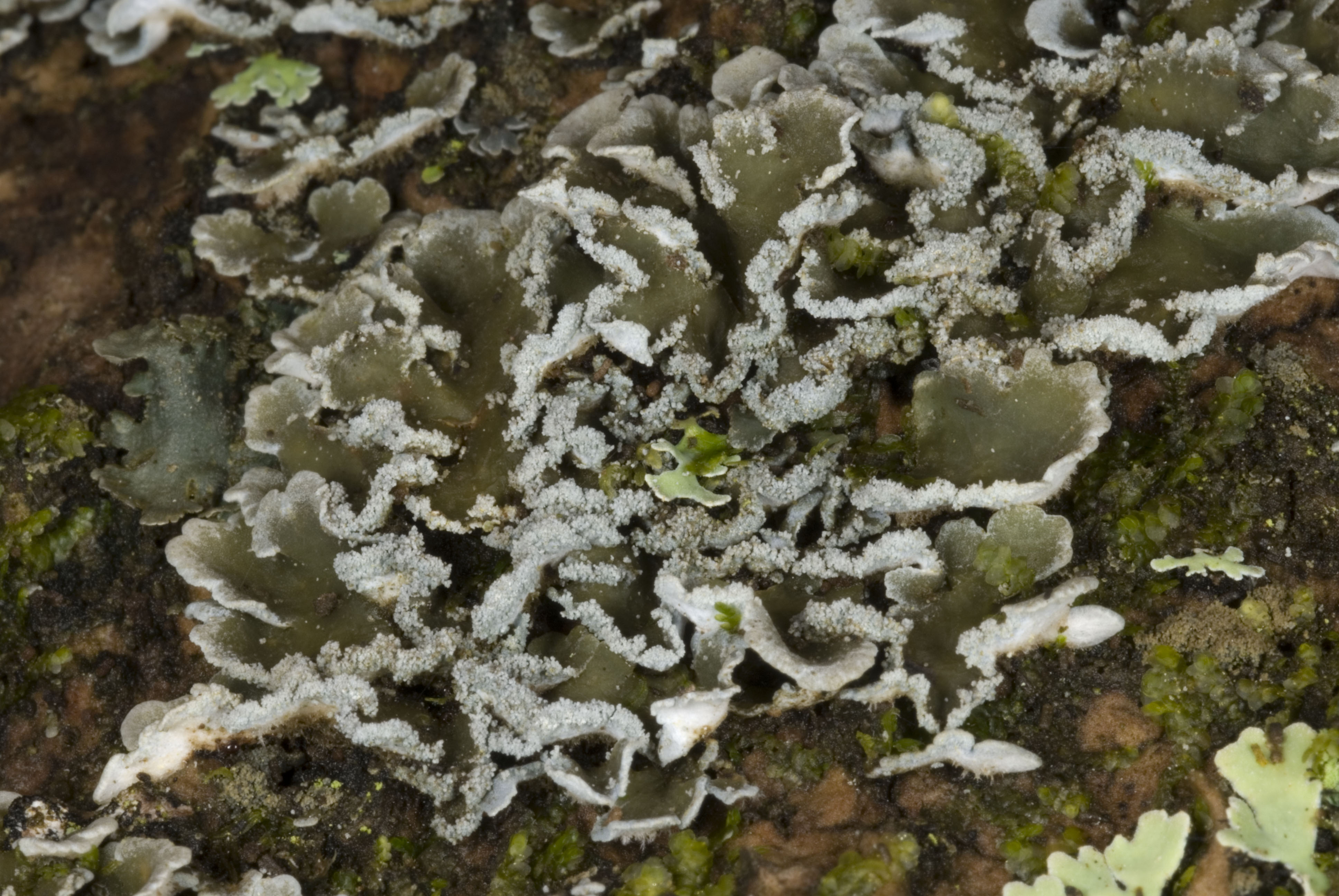
Pannaria fulvescens

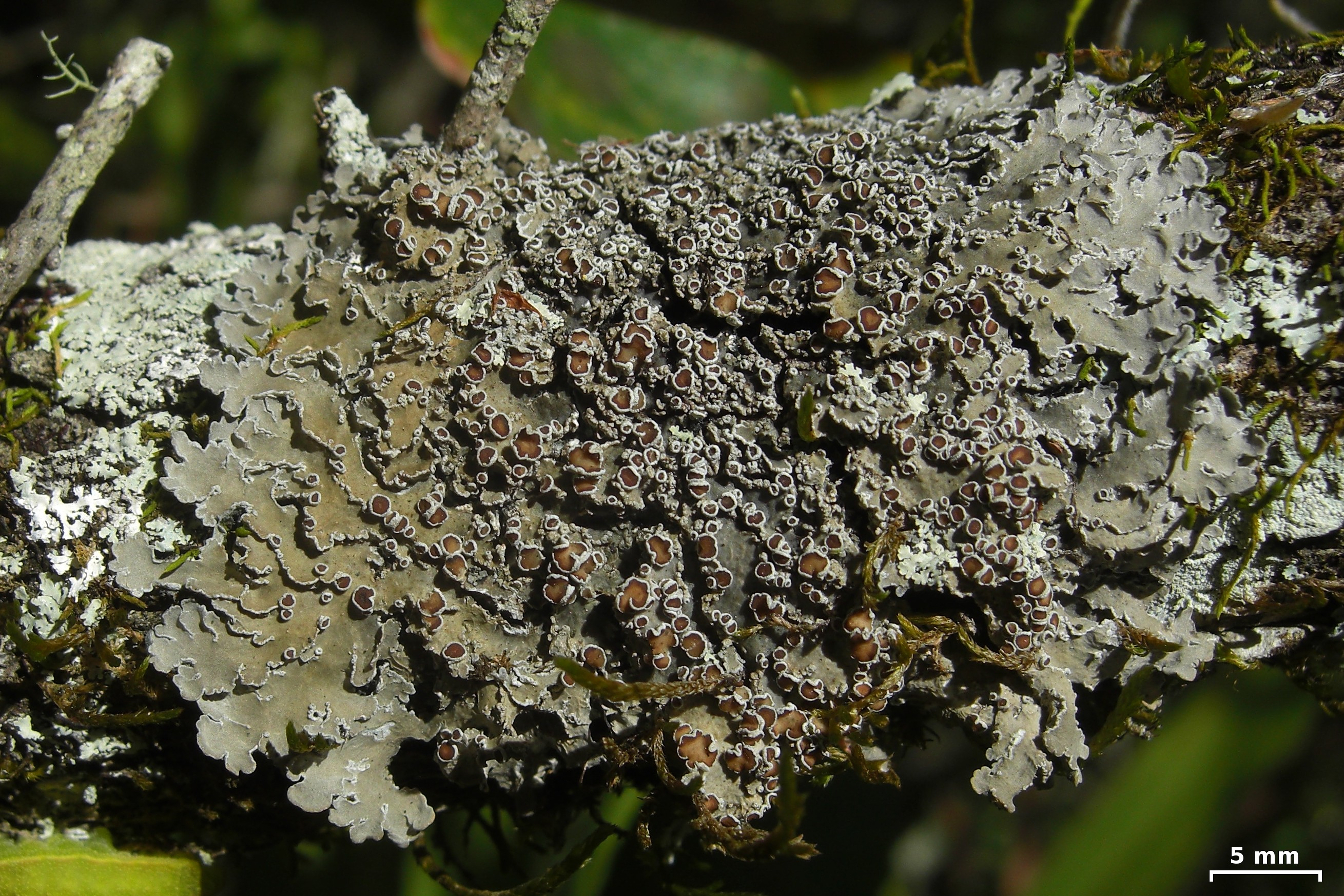
Pannaria lurida

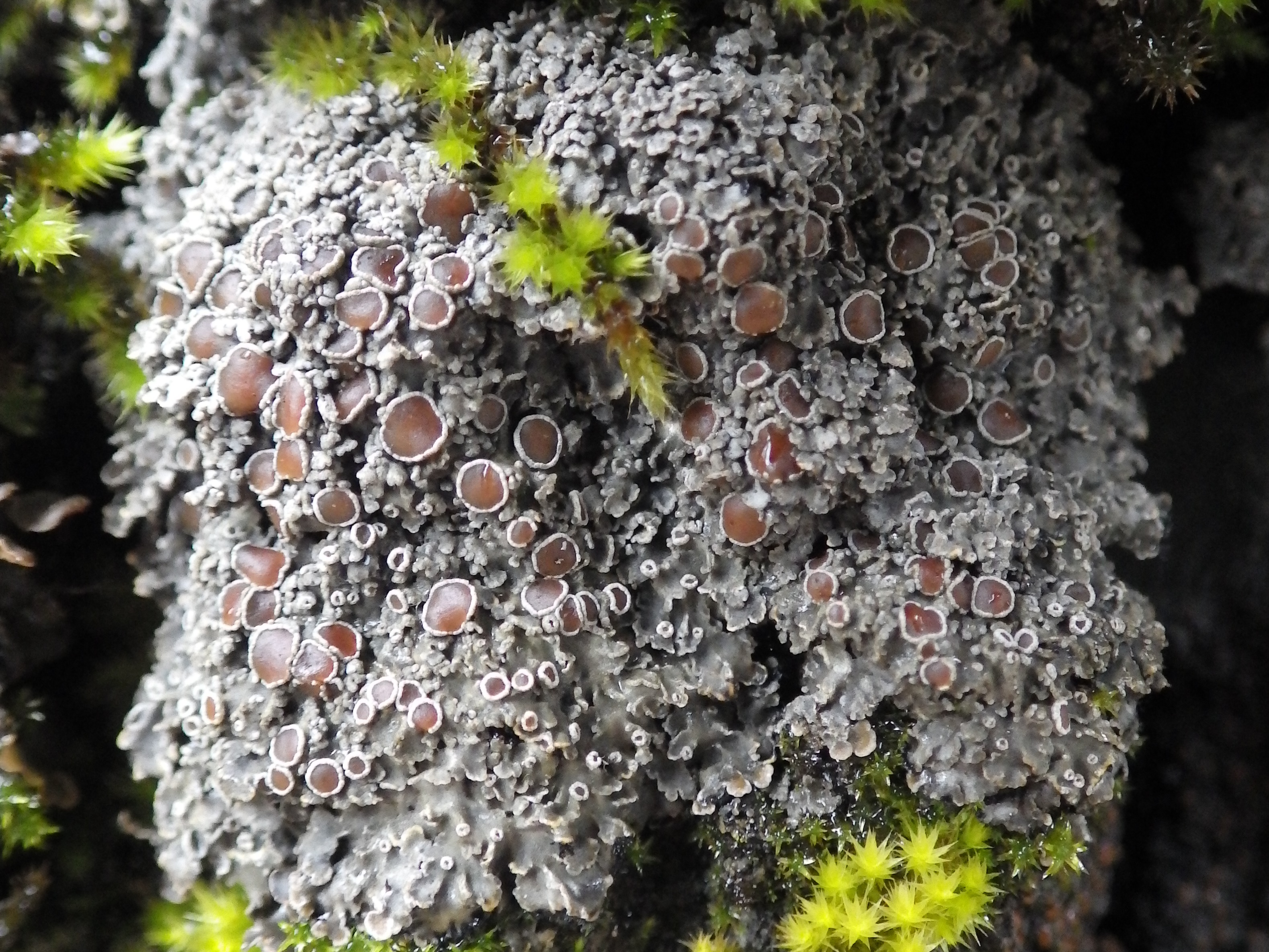
Pannaria rubiginosa

Pannarin is used as a taxonomic character in the genus Rinodina. It typically accumulates in the thallus, thalline exciple and/or epihymenium as irregularly shaped crystals of varying size that are visible in polarising light. These crystals dissolve after treatment with PD reagent, forming reddish-orange acicular crystals. Within Rinodina, species containing pannarin can be grouped according to several characters: for example, R. efflorescens, R. excrescens and R. granulans form a closely related group characterised by pannarin in the thallus, thalline exciple and epihymenium, whereas R. pruinella is distinguished by having pannarin only in its epihymenium.

In 2017, a previously unknown chemosyndrome (a characteristic set of chemical compounds produced by an organism) containing pannarin was discovered in two New Zealand lichen species (Pannaria gallowayi and P. aotearoana). In addition to pannarin as a major or minor component, the chemosyndrome includes contortin, porphyrilic acid, several terpenoids, and O-methyl-leprolomin – a novel compound first identified in this study. This added to several known pannarin-containing chemosyndromes in Pannaria species, which can include combinations with compounds like zeorin, norpannarin, or pannarin methyl acetal. Studies have shown that pannarin and vicanicin rarely co-occur in the same lichen thallus.

A chemotype of Lecanora dispersa has 2,7-dichlorolichexanthone as its predominant secondary metabolite. In culture, however, spore isolates of the fungal partner (mycobiont) produced pannarin and related depsidones in the absence of the algal photobiont, sometimes with only trace amounts of xanthones. Pannarin was not detected in fresh field material of this chemotype, but it was found in some older herbarium specimens. Leuckert and colleagues interpreted these findings as evidence that the intact lichen thallus and its isolated mycobiont differ in their main secondary metabolites, with xanthones dominating in the lichen and depsidones in culture, and as an unusual example of biosynthetic divergence in lichen mycobionts.

== Related compounds ==
Several structurally related compounds are known as derivatives of pannarin. Dechloropannarin is the dechlorinated analogue (molecular formula C_{18}H_{16}O_{6}, molecular mass 328, melting point 182–184 °C); it has been reported from Lecanora dispersa and Psoroma caesium. Nordechloropannarin (C_{17}H_{14}O_{6}, molecular mass 314,) has also been found in Lecanora dispersa. Norpannarin (C_{17}H_{13}ClO_{6}, molecular mass 348, melting point 198–202 °C) lacks one methyl group relative to pannarin and has been isolated from Erioderma chilense. Another derivative, 4-O-methylpannarin (C_{19}H_{17}ClO_{6}, molecular mass 376), has been obtained by synthesis but has not been reported from lichens.

A closely related chlorinated depsidone, argopsin (also known as 1'-chloropannarin), has the molecular formula C_{18}H_{14}Cl_{2}O_{6}, a molecular mass of about 397, and a melting point of 220–221 °C. It was first isolated from the lichen Argopsis friesiana and can be synthesised by chlorination of pannarin.
