= Journal of Eukaryotic Microbiology =

- Discipline: Microbiology
- Language: English

Publication details
- Publisher: Wiley
- Impact factor: 3.880 (2021)

Standard abbreviations
- ISO 4: J. Eukaryot. Microbiol.

Links
- Journal homepage

The Journal of Eukaryotic Microbiology is a peer-reviewed scientific journal covering all aspects of eukaryotic microbiology. The journal publishes research on protists, including lower algae and fungi.

According to the Journal Citation Reports, the journal has a 2021 impact factor of 3.880.

Starting with the first issue of 2014, the Journal is only published online.

== Abstracting and indexing ==
The journal is abstracting and indexing by various services for example:

- Abstracts in Anthropology (Sage)
- Abstracts on Hygiene & Communicable Diseases (CABI)
- Academic Search (EBSCO Publishing)
- Academic Search Premier (EBSCO Publishing)
- AgBiotech News & Information (CABI)
- AgBiotechNet (CABI)
- AGRICOLA Database (National Agricultural Library)
- Animal Breeding Abstracts (CABI)
- Biocontrol News & Information (CABI)
- Biological & Agricultural Index Plus (EBSCO Publishing)
- Biological Abstracts (Clarivate Analytics)
- BIOSIS Previews (Clarivate Analytics)
