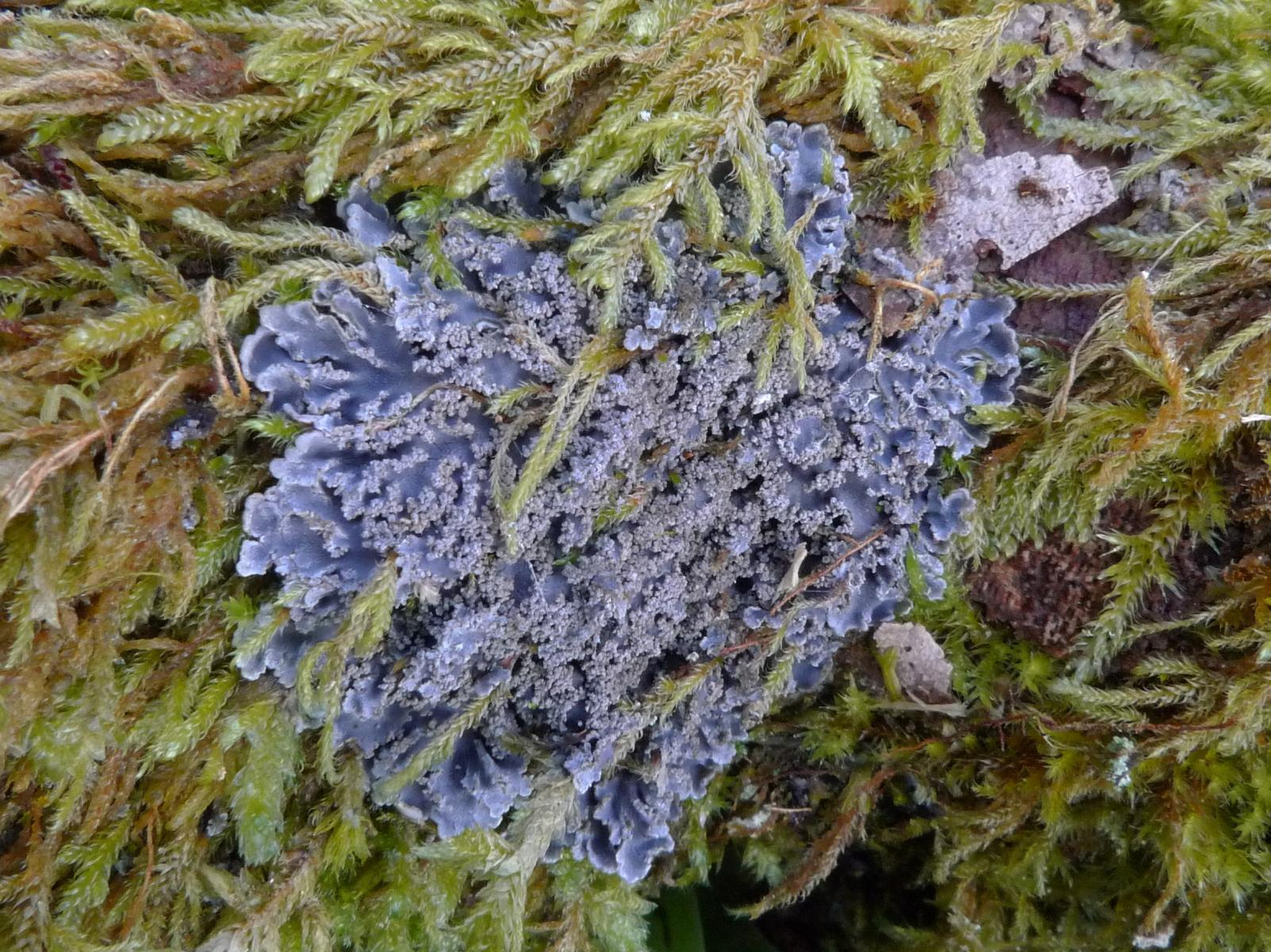
- Pannaria conoplea

Scientific classification
- Kingdom: Fungi
- Division: Ascomycota
- Class: Lecanoromycetes
- Order: Peltigerales
- Family: Pannariaceae
- Genus: Pannaria; Delise ex Bory (1828)

Type species
- Pannaria rubiginosa (Thunb.) Delise (1828)

Synonyms
- Amphinomium Nyl. (1888); Lepidoleptogium A.L.Sm. (1922); Lepidogium Clem. & Shear (1931); Pannaria subgen. Lepidoleptogium (A.L.Sm.) P.M.Jørg. (2004)

= Pannaria =

Genus of lichen-forming fungi

Pannaria is a genus of lichen-forming fungi in the family Pannariaceae. These lichens form leaf-like, scaly, or crusty patches that typically arrange themselves in loose rosettes on tree bark in humid forests. Most species partner with nitrogen-fixing cyanobacteria, though some contain green algae instead. The genus was established in 1828 and now includes about 80 recognized species found worldwide, particularly in tropical and subtropical regions.

== Description ==
Pannaria forms a thallus that can be leaf-like (foliose), a mosaic of tiny scales (squamulose), or a thin crust (crustose). Many species arrange their lobes in loose rosettes and, unlike several related genera, they rarely develop the blue-black felt (hypothallus) seen beneath other cyanobacterial lichens. The upper surface ranges from grey-blue to deep brown-black and may carry a light dusting of frost-like crystals (pruina). Most species partner with the filamentous cyanobacterium Nostoc, but members of the Pannaria sphinctrina group instead contain green algal cells.

The lichen's sexual fruiting bodies are sessile apothecia whose red-brown to black discs are framed by a persistent rim of thallus tissue. That rim has two zones: an outer layer of tightly packed, brick-like cells and an inner layer that is looser and packed with photobiont cells. A thin, pale exciple of pseudoparenchymatous cells surrounds the hymenium. The asci hold eight ascospores, show no blue reaction to potassium–iodide stain (K/I−) and lack the amyloid plug found in many related taxa. Their spores are colourless, single-celled, ellipsoidal and often end in one or two small points; the outer wall is finely warted or ridged.

Asexual reproduction is limited to scattered pycnidia that release straight, rod-shaped conidia. Thin-layer chromatography usually detects no secondary metabolites, though some species contain pannarin, which produces an orange-red colour with the para-phenylenediamine (Pd) spot test.

== Photobiont ==
Like most members of the Pannariaceae, species of Pannaria partner with filamentous, nitrogen-fixing cyanobacteria belonging to the genus Nostoc. A multilocus survey of 37 thalli representing 21 species showed that these cyanobionts are drawn from two broad Nostoc lineages previously known as the "Nephroma guild" and the "Peltigera guild"; the Pannaria sequences are scattered across both, with a gradual transition between them.

Host choice is flexible. Bipartite (cyanobacteria-only) and tripartite (cyanobacteria plus green-algal) species do not segregate cleanly by photobiont: some tripartite southern-hemisphere taxa share identical Nostoc strains with corticolous (bark-dwelling) bipartite species from both hemispheres, whereas other Pannaria species show marked selectivity, keeping to a narrow subset of strains. This breadth of associations contrasts with the tighter photobiont fidelity reported for genera such as Nephroma and Peltigera.

== Ecology ==
Species of Pannaria grow mainly as epiphytes on the bark of trees in sheltered, humid forests. They are encountered far less often on shaded rocks or on thin, moss-covered soil, where the micro-climate is similarly cool and moist.

== Species ==
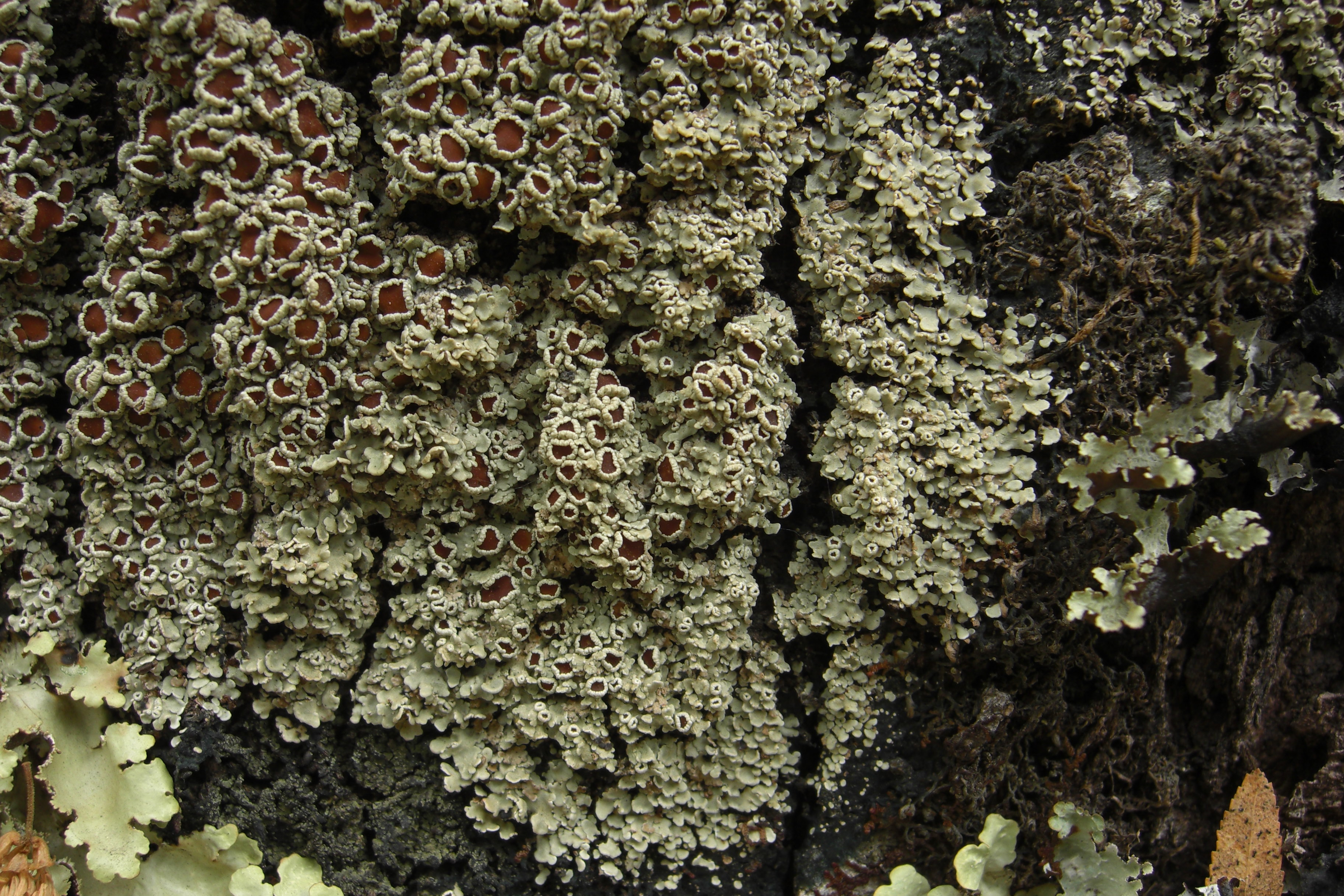
Pannaria (not identified to species) on a Nothofagus trunk in Quetrupillán, Chile

As of July 2025, Species Fungorum (in the Catalogue of Life) accept 78 species of Pannaria:

- Pannaria adpressa Zahlbr. (1930)
- Pannaria aenea Müll.Arg. (1896)
- Pannaria andina P.M.Jørg. & Sipman (2004)
- Pannaria allorhiza (Nyl.) Elvebakk & D.J.Galloway (2003)
- Pannaria aotearoana Elvebakk & Elix (2016)
- Pannaria applanata Eckfeldt (1894)
- Pannaria areolata Delise (1828)
- Pannaria asahinae P.M.Jørg. (2001)
- Pannaria athroophylla (Stirt.) Elvebakk & D.J.Galloway (2003)
- Pannaria atrofumosa C.Knight (1880)
- Pannaria auctorum Bory (1828)
- Pannaria brasiliensis Zahlbr. (1909)
- Pannaria byssoidea Passo & Calvelo (2011)
- Pannaria caesiocinerea (Vain.) P.M.Jørg. (2004)
- Pannaria caespitosa P.M.Jørg. (2000)
- Pannaria calophylla (Müll.Arg.) Passo & Calvelo (2006)
- Pannaria cameroonensis C.W.Dodge (1964)
- Pannaria carneopallens Vain. (1921)
- Pannaria cassa Elvebakk (2022)
- Pannaria centrifuga P.M.Jørg. (2001)
- Pannaria cheirolepis F.Wilson (1889)
- Pannaria chilensis Fée (1852)
- Pannaria cinerascens (Nyl.) P.M.Jørg. (2004)
- Pannaria complanata P.M.Jørg. (2001)
- Pannaria conoplea (Ach.) Bory (1828)
- Pannaria contorta (Müll.Arg.) Passo & Calvelo (2006)
- Pannaria craspedia Körb. (1859)
- Pannaria crenulata P.M.Jørg. (1983)
- Pannaria crispella (Nyl.) Elvebakk (2022)
- Pannaria crustata Stirt. (1873)
- Pannaria decipiens P.M.Jørg. & D.J.Galloway (1992)
- Pannaria delicata P.M.Jørg. & D.J.Galloway (1999)
- Pannaria delisei Bory (1838)
- Pannaria dissecta P.M.Jørg. (2001)
- Pannaria durietzii (P.James & Henssen) Elvebakk & D.J.Galloway (2003)
- Pannaria ekistophylla Colmeiro (1867)
- Pannaria elatior Stirt. (1899)
- Pannaria elegantior P.M.Jørg. (2003)
- Pannaria elixii P.M.Jørg. & D.J.Galloway (1992)
- Pannaria emodii P.M.Jørg. (2001)
- Pannaria euphylla (Nyl.) Elvebakk & D.J.Galloway (2003)
- Pannaria exasperata H.Magn. (1944)
- Pannaria farinosa Elvebakk & Fritt-Rasm. (2007)
- Pannaria fimbriata P.M.Jørg. (2001)
- Pannaria flabellata P.M.Jørg. (2012)
- Pannaria formosana P.M.Jørg. (2001)
- Pannaria fulvescens (Mont.) Nyl. (1857)
- Pannaria fumbris Kremp. (1874)
- Pannaria funebris Kremp. (1874)
- Pannaria gallowayi Elvebakk & Elix (2016)
- Pannaria glacialis Anzi (1860)
- Pannaria granulifera Müll.Arg. (1896)
- Pannaria globigera Hue (1909)
- Pannaria holospoda Nyl. (1888)
- Pannaria hookeri (Borrer) Nyl. (1857)
- Pannaria howeana Elvebakk (2012)
- Pannaria hypnorum (Vahl) Körb. (1855)
- Pannaria immixta Nyl. (1867)
- Pannaria implexa (Stirt.) Passo, Calvelo & S.Stenroos (2008)
- Pannaria insularis P.M.Jørg. & Kashiw. (2001)
- Pannaria isidiosa Elvebakk & Elix (2006)
- Pannaria italica Gyeln. (1940)
- Pannaria japonica Räsänen (1940)
- Pannaria kantvilasii Elvebakk (2022)
- Pannaria kerguelensis C.W.Dodge (1966)
- Pannaria laciniata Zahlbr. (1941)
- Pannaria laciniosa Hue (1902)
- Pannaria lanuginosa (Hoffm.) Szatala (1930)
- Pannaria lasiella Stirt. (1878)
- Pannaria lepidophora Vain. (1921)
- Pannaria leproloma (Nyl.) P.M.Jørg. (2001)
- Pannaria limbata Vain. (1921)
- Pannaria lobulifera Elvebakk (2007)
- Pannaria lurida (Mont.) Nyl. (1857)
- Pannaria luridula Nyl. (1876)
- Pannaria macrocarpa Müll.Arg. (1892)
- Pannaria malmei C.W.Dodge (1933)
- Pannaria mangroviana P.M.Jørg. (2001)
- Pannaria melanesica Elvebakk (2020)
- Pannaria melanotricha Müll.Arg. (1885)
- Pannaria microphyllizans (Nyl.) P.M.Jørg. (2001)
- Pannaria minutiphylla Elvebakk (2013)
- Pannaria molkenboeri (Mont. & Bosch) Hue (1902)
- Pannaria molybdodes F.Wilson (1889)
- Pannaria mosenii C.W.Dodge (1933)
- Pannaria multifida P.M.Jørg. (2004)
- Pannaria myrioloba Müll.Arg. (1896)
- Pannaria neocaledonica B.de Lesd. (1910)
- Pannaria nilgherriensis P.M.Jørg. & Upreti (2003)
- Pannaria obscura Müll.Arg. (1895)
- Pannaria oregonensis McCune & M.Schultz (2022)
- Pannaria pannosa (Sw.) Nyl. (1855)
- Pannaria papuana (Aptroot & Diederich) P.M.Jørg. & Sipman (2006)
- Pannaria parmeliae F.Wilson (1889)
- Pannaria patagonica (Malme) Elvebakk & D.J.Galloway (2003)
- Pannaria perfossa Stirt. (1875)
- Pannaria phloeodes Stirt. (1877)
- Pannaria phyllidiata Elvebakk (2011)
- Pannaria placodioides Nyl. ex Cromb. (1875)
- Pannaria placodiopsis Nyl. (1875)
- Pannaria planiuscula P.M.Jørg. (2003)
- Pannaria prolifera Müll.Arg. (1882)
- Pannaria prolificans Vain. (1896)
- Pannaria pruinosa P.M.Jørg. & Timdal (2004)
- Pannaria pulverulacea Elvebakk (2013)
- Pannaria pulvinula P.M.Jørg. (2000)
- Pannaria pyxinoides (Nyl.) Elvebakk (2018)
- Pannaria ramosii Vain. (1921)
- Pannaria ramulosa P.M.Jørg. (2001)
- Pannaria reflectens (Nyl.) P.M.Jørg. (2010)
- Pannaria rolfii Elvebakk (2012)
- Pannaria romanoana Hue (1915)
- Pannaria rubiginea Nyl. (1859)
- Pannaria rubiginella P.M.Jørg. & Sipman (2004)
- Pannaria rubiginosa (Thunb. ex Ach.) Delise (1828)
- Pannaria squamulosa P.M.Jørg. (2003)
- Pannaria streimannii Elvebakk (2012)
- Pannaria subcrustacea (Räsänen) P.M.Jørg. (2001)
- Pannaria subfusca P.M.Jørg. (2000)
- Pannaria subrubiginosa Brodo & McMullin (2025)
- Pannaria subsimilis C.Knight (1880)
- Pannaria superior Nyl. (1868)
- Pannaria taylorii Tuck. (1875)
- Pannaria tavaresii P.M.Jørg. (1978)
- Pannaria tenuis P.M.Jørg. & Sipman (2006)
- Pannaria tetraspora Maheu & A.Gillet (1926)
- Pannaria thoroldii C.W.Dodge (1964)
- Pannaria thraustolepis F.Wilson (1889)
- Pannaria tjibodensis Zahlbr. (1928)
- Pannaria vischii C.W.Dodge (1971)
- Pannaria wrightiorum Elvebakk (2022)
