= Pannaria complanata =

Scientific classification
- Kingdom: Fungi
- Division: Ascomycota
- Class: Lecanoromycetes
- Order: Peltigerales
- Family: Pannariaceae
- Genus: Pannaria
- Species: P. complanata

Binomial name
- Pannaria complanata P.M.Jørg. (2001)

Species of lichen

Pannaria complanata is a species of corticolous (bark-dwelling), squamulose (scaley) to foliose (leafy) lichen in the family Pannariaceae. It was formally described as a new species in 2001 by the Norwegian lichenologist Per Magnus Jørgensen. The type specimen was collected from the Doddabetta peak in the Nilgiri Mountains at an altitude of about 3,000 m (9,800 ft). The lichen makes circular patches typically up to about 5 cm (2 in) in diameter, comprising brownish, flat lobes measuring up to two mm wide. The photobiont partner is a member of the cyanobacterial genus Nostoc. The PD+ (orange) chemical spot test reaction indicates the presence of pannarin, a lichen product. The geographic range of the lichen includes India, Sri Lanka, and Indonesia. In India it is found only in the Western Ghats, having been recorded from Kerala and Tamil Nadu. In this country Pannaria complanata often associates with moss genus Hyophila.
