= Ladislav Mucina =

- Professor Ladislav Mucina with his Vegetation Map of South Africa, Lesotho, and Swaziland.
- Born: 28 May 1956 (age 70); Piešťany, Slovakia
- Education: Comenius University; Slovak Academy of Sciences, Bratislava; University of Vienna; Technische Universität Berlin
- Known for: Community assembly rules and use of plant functional types in community ecology
- Scientific career
- Fields: Vegetation
- Institutions: University of Nijmegen; University of Western Australia

Ladislav Mucina is a vegetation scientist and Professor and Iluka Chair of Vegetation Science and Biogeography at the School of Biological Science of The University of Western Australia in Perth. He was born on 28 May 1956 in Piešťany, Slovakia.

== Education ==
Ladislav Mucina received his education in Slovakia and was awarded scientific degrees and teaching qualifications in botany, vegetation science, plant ecology and plant taxonomy at the Comenius University and Slovak Academy of Sciences in Bratislava in Slovakia, the University of Vienna in Austria and Technische Universität Berlin in Germany.

He completed post-doctoral studies at the University of Nijmegen in the Netherlands, and later served as visiting fellow and professor in Trieste, Camerino, Perugia, and Rome, all in Italy, Uppsala in Sweden, Kuwait, Perth, Western Australia in Australia as well as Pretoria, University of the North, later University of Free State and Stellenbosch, all in South Africa. In Slovakia, Professor Mucina was associated with the Slovak Academy of Sciences and later, after immigrating to Austria, he served at the University of Vienna.

== Research works ==
His research includes vegetation surveys, theoretical vegetation science, numerical methods and data-banking in plant ecology, biogeography, population ecology, evolutionary biology and plant taxonomy. His recent research focuses include community assembly rules and use of plant functional types in community ecology, with a particular focus on Mediterranean type shrublands and semi-deserts. Ladislav Mucina has participated in numerous important scientific projects including the vegetation survey of Austria, studies in vegetation patterning and population ecology of Central European dry grasslands, and syntaxonomic calibration of the EUNIS habitat directive of the European Union.

He is the co-founder and ex-chairman of the European Vegetation Survey (a working group of the International Association for Vegetation Science), co-founder the National Vegetation Database in South Africa, and Scientific Coordinator of the South African National Biodiversity Institute's Vegetation Map of South Africa, Lesotho and Swaziland Project.

Mucina is the author or co-author of 28 books and symposium volumes, and more than 300 peer-reviewed papers and book chapters. In 2016 he published (with a team of other 32 vegetation scientists) the first continental vegetation system - Vegetation of Europe (published in journal Applied Vegetation Science).

Professor Mucina has served for a long time as vice-president of the International Association for Vegetation Sciences and is a founding member and former Editor of the journal Applied Vegetation Science.

== Media links ==
- Botany professor steers the world's vegetation science learned society Matie News. South Africa.
- Slovak botanist helps to survey South Africa's plant riches Matie News. South Africa.
