= Calopadia editiae =

Scientific classification
- Kingdom: Fungi
- Division: Ascomycota
- Class: Lecanoromycetes
- Order: Lecanorales
- Family: Ectolechiaceae
- Genus: Calopadia
- Species: C. editiae

Binomial name
- Calopadia editiae Vèzda ex Chaves & Lücking (2011)

Species of lichen-forming fungus

Calopadia editiae (Note: Originally spelled Calopadia editae, but later corrected to editiae.) is a species of lichen in the family Ectolechiaceae. It is found in Tanzania, with a distribution that extends to Costa Rica and the Galápagos Islands. It can be found on leaves or bark and is characterised by its pale grey to brownish grey colour, rounded apothecia and distinctive pruina. Described as new to science in 2011, the species was named in honour of Hungarian lichenologist Edit Farkas.

== Taxonomy ==
The first scientific collections of Calopadia editiae were made by Hungarian lichenologist Edit Farkas in 1989. She discovered the lichen in Tanzania, specifically in the Morogoro Region, on the south-eastern slope of Mount Kanga at an elevation between 850 and 1,200 m (2,790 and 3,940 ft). Antonín Vězda intended to dedicate the species to her but was unable to do so before his death in 2008. José Luis Chaves and Robert Lücking used Vězda's original name and validly published the species in 2011.

== Description ==
Calopadia editiae is a foliicolous or corticolous lichen, meaning that it grows on leaves or bark. The thallus, or vegetative body of the lichen, is continuous or dispersed into rounded, confluent patches up to 50 mm across and 20–40 μm thick. Its colour ranges from pale grey to brownish grey, and the surface is smooth and lacks a cortex. The apothecia, or fruiting bodies, are rounded, 0.5–1 mm in diameter and 250–350 μm high, with a light brown disc that is initially flat but becomes convex as the apothecium matures. The disc is covered with a thick, pale yellowish to cream-coloured pruina, which is a powdery substance found on the surface of some lichens. The ascospores are oblong to ellipsoid, muriform, colourless, and measure 50–80 by 20–30 μm.

Calopadia editiae is similar in appearance to Calopadia perpallida, another pantropical lichen species. However, Calopadia editiae can be distinguished by its shorter ascospores, which typically measure 50–80 by 20–30 μm, as opposed to the longer ascospores of Calopadia perpallida that mostly exceed 100 μm in length. Calopadia saxicola is another species with pruinose apothecia and muriform ascospores, but its asci typically contain 2 or 3 spores, and it has a whitish (rather than yellowish) pruina on its apothecia.

== Habitat and distribution ==
Calopadia editiae has a wide tropical distribution and has been found in collections from Tanzania, Costa Rica, and the Galápagos Islands. It grows on leaves or bark and is typically found in more or less exposed microsites at low to mid elevations.
