= Pannaria lurida =

Conservation status
- Apparently Secure (NatureServe)

Scientific classification
- Kingdom: Fungi
- Division: Ascomycota
- Class: Lecanoromycetes
- Order: Peltigerales
- Family: Pannariaceae
- Genus: Pannaria
- Species: P. lurida

Binomial name
- Pannaria lurida (Mont.) Nyl.

Species of fungus

Pannaria lurida, commonly known as the wrinkled shingle lichen, is a species of lichen found on the eastern side of North America. It is listed as threatened under the Species at Risk Act.

It is brownish-gray with a wrinkled leafy appearance and reddish-brown apothecia, and prefers wet mixed-wood forests.

As of 2016, Canadian surveys showed that of the examples known to exist around 1986, records supported one sample in Newfoundland and three in Nova Scotia including two in Kejimkujik National Park and one in Five Islands Provincial Park, with others unverified.

In the 2000s, two more were found in New Brunswick, three in PEI and more than a dozen in Nova Scotia.
