= Pannaria phyllidiata =

Scientific classification
- Kingdom: Fungi
- Division: Ascomycota
- Class: Lecanoromycetes
- Order: Peltigerales
- Family: Pannariaceae
- Genus: Pannaria
- Species: P. phyllidiata

Binomial name
- Pannaria phyllidiata Elvebakk (2011)

Species of lichen

Pannaria phyllidiata is a species of lichen in the family Pannariaceae. Known from Australia, it was described as new to science in 2011. It is characterised by its unique phyllidia (small leaf-like or scale-like propagules) and distinct distribution.

== Taxonomy ==
Pannaria phyllidiata was first formally described by Arve Elvebakk as a new species in 2011. The type specimen was found by the author in New South Wales, Australia, specifically at Brown Mountain at an elevation of 90 m (300 ft); there it was found growing on southern Sassafras (Atherosperma moschatum). The species name, phyllidiata, is derived from the numerous large phyllidia that characterise the lichen.

== Description ==
Pannaria phyllidiata resembles the Pannaria sphinctrina species but can be distinguished by the presence of approximately 0.5 mm long, branched, and ascending phyllidia, as well as nodulose apical extensions of the perispores. The lichen forms foliose rosettes with a diameter of 3–15 cm (1.2–5.9 in), closely attached to the substrate. The lobes are irregularly to subdichotomously branched, discrete in peripheral parts, and imbricate to centrally coalescent. The upper surface is pale greyish-green, smooth (glabrous), and glossy, turning chestnut brown over time in herbaria.

The photobiont layer is 20–25 μm thick, consisting of more or less spherical cells that resemble Myrmecia. Apothecia are scattered and laminal, with discs that are rufous brown and flat. The proper ascospores are hyaline, non-septate, ellipsoid to lemon-shaped, and distinctly verrucose when mature; they measure 7.5–10 by 12–16 μm.

The secondary chemistry of Pannaria phyllidiata includes vicanicin as the major compound and trace amounts of unidentified terpenoids.

== Habitat and distribution ==
This lichen species is primarily found in New South Wales, Australia, with single occurrences in Victoria and Queensland. Pannaria phyllidiata typically grows on tree or tree fern trunks in rainforests at elevations between 200 and 1,500 m (660 and 4,920 ft), occasionally on rocks near streams. It is associated with various tree species, including Nothofagus, Eucalyptus, Olearia, Pomaderis, Trochocarpa laurina, Lomatia ilicifolia, and Bedfordia salicina.

== Relationship to other species ==
Pannaria phyllidiata belongs to the Pannaria sphinctrina species complex, as circumscribed by Elvebakk in 2007. This group is characterised by thin lobes and the presence of vicanicin as the major secondary compound. Pannaria phyllidiata differs from other species in the complex by its numerous, ascending, and branched phyllidia, which are larger than the propagules of other undescribed species in the group. Pannaria minutiphylla, found in New Zealand, has smaller phyllidia (0.2–0.3 mm tall) that are less erect, and ascospores that measure 6.5–9.0 by 15–21 μm.
