= Badimia =

Scientific classification
- Kingdom: Fungi
- Division: Ascomycota
- Class: Lecanoromycetes
- Order: Lecanorales
- Family: Ramalinaceae
- Genus: Badimia; Vèzda (1986)

Type species
- Badimia dimidiata (Bab. ex Leight.) Vězda (1986)

Synonyms
- Pseudogyalecta Vězda (1975)

Genus of fungi

Badimia is a genus of foliicolous (leaf-inhabiting) lichens in the family Ramalinaceae.

== Taxonomy ==
Badimia was circumscribed by Czech lichenologist Antonin Vězda in 1986 as a segregate of the genus Bacidia, and originally contained six species. The genus was formerly placed in the family Ectolechiaceae or the Pilocarpaceae, but molecular analysis showed that the type species Badimia dimidiata nested within the Ramalinaceae. This familial placement has been accepted in recent large-scale updates of fungal classifications.

== Description ==
Badimia species form a thin crust on the substrate, usually pale blue-green to blue-grey and sometimes with a fine, powdery bloom. The surface may be smooth or minutely warted. Their fruiting bodies (apothecia) are small discs that sit tightly on the thallus and are pinched in at the base; the discs are typically light-coloured and initially shallowly concave, with a low but distinct rim. The apothecial rim tissue (excipulum) is built of "brick-like" cells (paraplectenchyma) that often grade outward into radiating tissue and are densely packed with colourless crystals. The internal sterile threads (paraphyses) are slender and mostly simple to only sparsely branched. Spore sacs (asci) contain eight ascospores; the spores are ellipsoid and usually divided by three cross-walls (3-septate), only rarely showing a more "brick-walled" (submuriform) division.

A conspicuous feature of Badimia is the presence of campylidia, which are specialised, pocket-like asexual structures that are closely related in construction to the apothecia. In Badimia these can be relatively large, sometimes exceeding the apothecia, and their "roof" soon bends back to expose the inner surface. They produce long, thread-like conidia up to about 130 μm long and 1.5–2.5 μm wide; the conidia are multi-septate, gently curved with sharply pointed tips that often hook back, and many cells bear short, one-sided hyphal appendages with sticky ends. In practical terms, the combination of a pale bluish crust, tightly seated, often light-coloured discs with a crystal-rich rim, eight-spored asci, predominantly 3-septate spores, and the production of these distinctive curved conidia in campylidia is diagnostic for the genus.

== Species ==
- Badimia cateilea (Vain.) Lücking, Lumbsch & Elix (1994)
- Badimia corticola Kalb & Vězda (1987)
- Badimia dimidiata (Bab. ex Leight.) Vězda (1986)
- Badimia elegans (Vain.) Vězda (1986)
- Badimia elixii Kalb & Lumbsch (2001)
- Badimia galbinea (Kremp.) Vězda (1986)
- Badimia lecanorina (Zahlbr.) Lücking, Lumbsch & Elix (1994)
- Badimia leioplacella (Müll.Arg.) Lücking (2008)
- Badimia lucida Aptroot & Sérus. (1997)
- Badimia montoyana Lücking (1995)
- Badimia multiseptata Papong & Lücking (2011)
- Badimia pallidula (Kremp.) Vězda (1986)
- Badimia polillensis (Vain.) Vězda (1986)
- Badimia stanhopeae (Müll.Arg.) Vězda (1989)
- Badimia subelegans Sipman & Lücking (1998)
- Badimia tuckermanii (R.Sant.) Lücking, Lumbsch & Elix (1994)
- Badimia verrucosa (Vězda) Lücking & Vězda (2008)
- Badimia vezdana Lücking, Farkas & V. Wirth (2011)
- Badimia vieillardii (Müll.Arg.) Vězda (1986)
