= Campylidium =

Scientific classification
- Kingdom: Plantae
- Division: Bryophyta
- Class: Bryopsida
- Subclass: Bryidae
- Order: Hypnales
- Family: Amblystegiaceae
- Genus: Campylidium (Kindb.) Ochyra

Genus of mosses

Campylidium is a genus of mosses belonging to the family Amblystegiaceae.

The genus was first described by Nils Conrad Kindberg.

The species of this genus are found in Europe.

Species:

- Campylidium sommerfeltii
