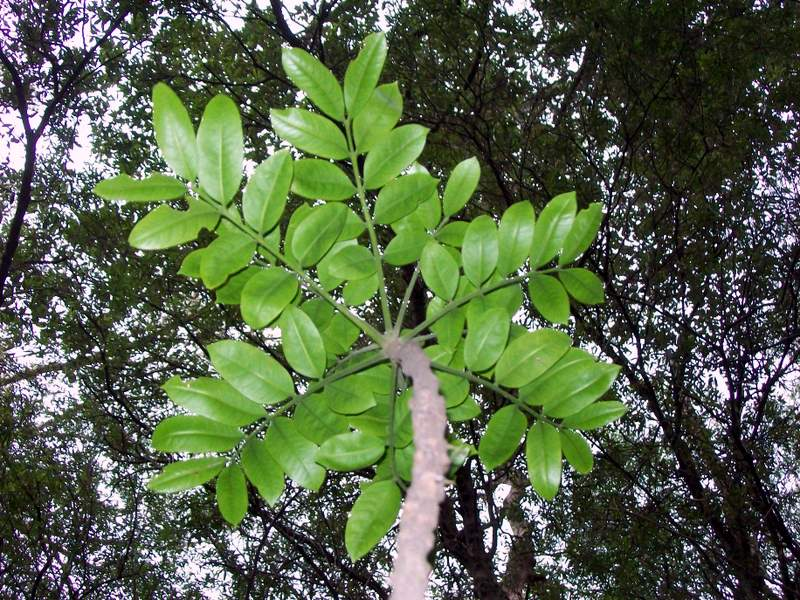

Scientific classification
- Kingdom: Plantae
- Clade: Tracheophytes
- Clade: Angiosperms
- Clade: Eudicots
- Clade: Rosids
- Order: Sapindales
- Family: Meliaceae
- Genus: Didymocheton
- Species: D. pachyphyllus

Binomial name
- Didymocheton pachyphyllus (Hemsl.) Mabb. & Holzmeyer

Synonyms
- Dysoxylum pachyphyllum Hemsl.

= Didymocheton pachyphyllus =

Species of tree

Didymocheton pachyphyllus is a small tree in the family Meliaceae, endemic to Lord Howe Island. It grows up to 15 m (49 ft) tall, and is found at all elevations on the island.
