= Calopadia saxicola =

Scientific classification
- Kingdom: Fungi
- Division: Ascomycota
- Class: Lecanoromycetes
- Order: Lecanorales
- Family: Ectolechiaceae
- Genus: Calopadia
- Species: C. saxicola

Binomial name
- Calopadia saxicola Gumboski (2015)

Species of lichen

Calopadia saxicola is a species of saxicolous (rock-dwelling) crustose lichen in the family Ectolechiaceae. It is found on the rocky shores of southern Brazil, where it thrives in the shade of vegetated zones and grows directly on rocks away from other crustose lichens. The lichen was formally described as a new species in 2015. Calopadia saxicola stands out from its close relatives due to its well-defined thallus, reddish-brown disc, thicker hymenium, and smaller conidia.

== Taxonomy ==
Calopadia saxicola was first described by Emerson Luiz Gumboski in 2015. The type specimen was discovered in Brazil, within the state of Santa Catarina, in the Municipality of Penha, on the rocky seashore just north of Praia Vermelha. The species epithet alludes to its rock-dwelling habitat preference.

== Description ==
The saxicolous thallus of Calopadia saxicola is continuous and clearly defined, with colours ranging from whitish to pale brown, and dirty brown on older parts. It has a smooth to rugose surface, a weakly shiny appearance, and can be up to 0.3 mm thick and 10 cm (4 in) in diameter. The lichen's apothecia are biatorine and sessile, with a brownish to reddish-brown disc covered in whitish pruina, while the asci are mainly 2–3-spored. The conidia are filiform, curved with a single smooth clavate apex, and hyaline, typically measuring 45–55 by 2.0–3.5 μm, with 4–7 septa. The lichen does not contain any detectable secondary metabolites.

== Similar species ==
Calopadia saxicola is similar to its close relative, C. chacoensis, in terms of general apothecium and campylidium features. However, C. saxicola has a clearly defined and thicker thallus, a brownish to reddish-brown disc with a thicker hymenium, and shorter and broader conidia. In comparison, C. chacoensis has a less defined and thinner thallus, a dark brown to black disc, and longer and narrower conidia.

Other species with more than one ascospore per ascus, such as C. foliicola and C. phyllogena, have ecorticate and thin thalli, while C. saxicola has a corticate thallus. They also differ in apothecium morphology. For example, C. foliicola has a convex disc with pale yellow pruina, and C. phyllogena has a flat disc lacking pruina.

Calopadia saxicola is also similar to C. puiggarii and C. fusca in hypothecium colour and muriform ascospore size, but both have an ecorticate thallus, epruinose apothecium, and a single-spored ascus with shorter ascospores.

Notably, the halo surrounding the ascospores of C. saxicola is only observable in fresh specimens, disappearing after about six months. Additionally, field observations made approximately 30 months after the initial collection of the material showed that the specimens of C. saxicola, which originally had fertile apothecia, featured only an old campylidium and no apothecia at that time.

== Habitat and distribution ==
Calopadia saxicola is endemic to the rocky seashores of southern Brazil, where it grows directly on shaded rocks near vegetated zones and is protected from direct wave splash. Most specimens are found in isolation, away from other crustose lichens.
