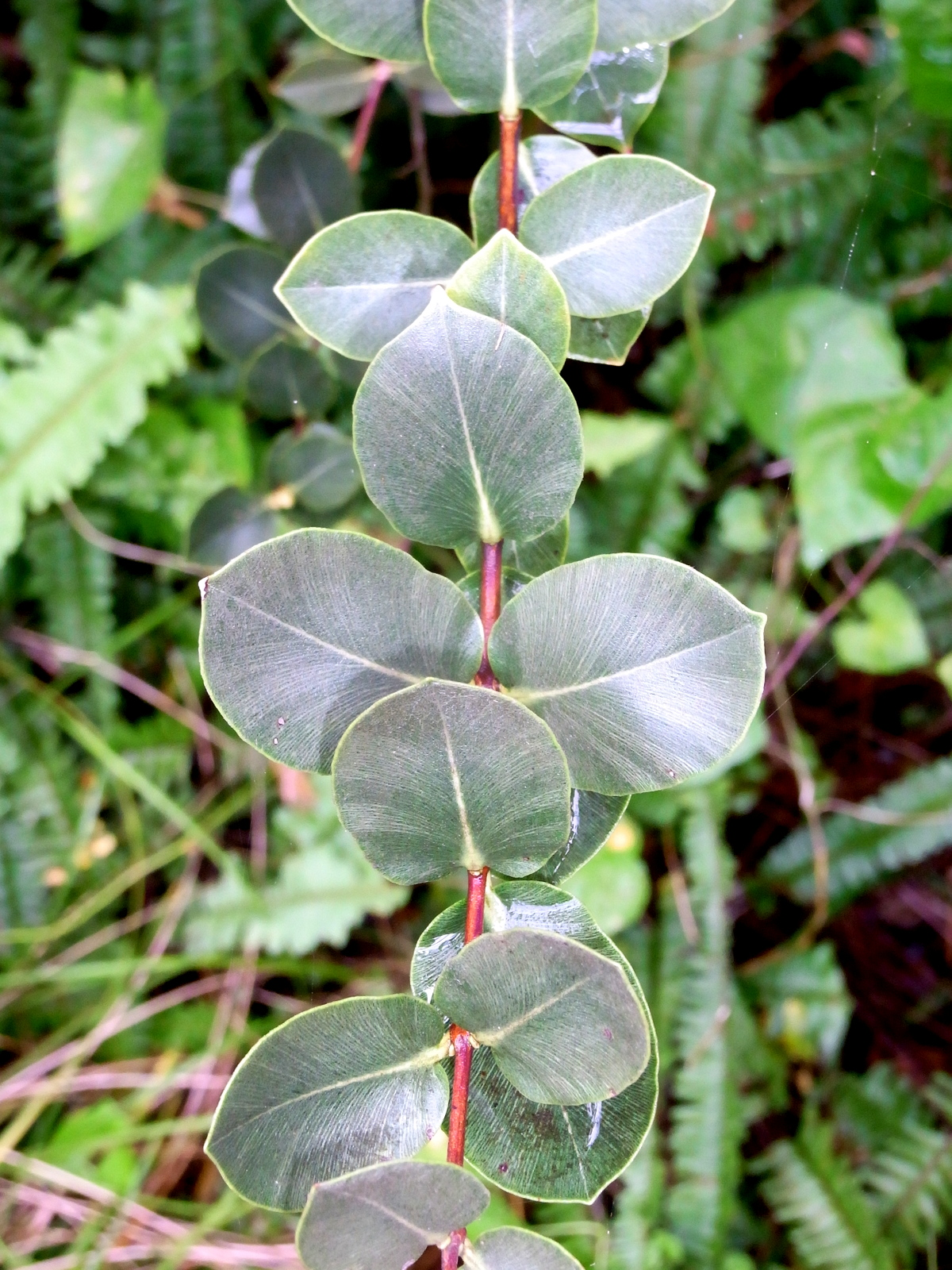

Scientific classification
- Kingdom: Plantae
- Clade: Tracheophytes
- Clade: Angiosperms
- Clade: Eudicots
- Clade: Rosids
- Order: Myrtales
- Family: Myrtaceae
- Genus: Metrosideros
- Species: M. nervulosa

Binomial name
- Metrosideros nervulosa C.Moore & F.Muell.

= Metrosideros nervulosa =

Species of flowering plant

Metrosideros nervulosa, commonly known as the mountain rose, is a species of flowering plant in the family Myrtaceae. It is endemic to Lord Howe Island in the Tasman Sea, part of the Australian state of New South Wales. It occurs in shrubland or low forest, mainly at altitudes of 300–875 m on the main peaks of the island. It prefers sunny positions on exposed ridges or in the forest canopy.

== Description ==
It grows as a shrub or small tree, up to 8 m in height. It bears flowers with showy deep red (occasionally yellow) stamens from late October until January.

== See also ==
- Metrosideros sclerocarpa – a similar and closely related plant also endemic to Lord Howe, also known as “Mountain Rose”, differentiated by altitudinal range
