= Arve Elvebakk =

Norwegian lichenologist

Arve Elvebakk (born 1951) is a Norwegian mycologist and professor working from the Arctic University of Norway in Tromsø. He has published widely on Arctic biology, and climatology. Additionally, he collaborates with many mycologists across the world, and has published names for lichens in Australia, New Zealand, the South Pacific, and South America, and the Antarctic.

== Some published names ==
- Gibbosporina
- Gibbosporina acuminata
- Gibbosporina elixii
- Pannaria phyllidiata

See also Taxa named by Arve Elvebakk.

== Selected works ==
=== Books ===
- Elvebakk, Arve; Prestrud, Pal, eds. (1996). A catalogue of Svalbard plants, fungi, algae and cyanobacteria (PDF). Norwegian Polar Institute. ISBN 978-82-7666-094-4. Wikidata Q105623433.

=== Journal articles ===
- Chae Haeng Park; Soon Gyu Hong; Elvebakk, Arve (2018). "Psoroma antarcticum, a new lichen species from Antarctica and neighbouring areas" (PDF). Polar Biology. 41 (6): 1083–1090. doi:10.1007/s00300-018-2265-x. Wikidata Q105623512.
- Per M Jørgensen; Andersen, Heidi; Elvebakk, Arve (2019). "The genus Massalongia (lichenised ascomycetae) in the Southern Hemisphere". MycoKeys. 60: 125–140. doi:10.3897/mycokeys.60.37725. PMC 6906167. PMID 31844414. Wikidata Q87013009.
- Elvebakk, Arve; Soon Gyu Hong; Chae Haeng Park (2020). "Hispidopannaria and Phormopsora, two new and small, but evolutionary old Pannariaceae lichen genera from southern South America". Mycological Progress. 19 (11): 1353–1364. doi:10.1007/s11557-020-01632-1. Wikidata Q105623588.
- Fred J. A. Daniëls; Elvebakk, Arve; Nadezhda V. Matveyeva; Ladislav Mucina (2016). "The Drabo corymbosae-Papaveretea dahliani − a new vegetation class of the High Arctic polar deserts". Hacquetia. 15 (1): 5–13. doi:10.1515/hacq-2016-0001. Wikidata Q105623574.
- Elvebakk, Arve; Ana Rosa Flores; John Michael Watson (2015). "Revisions in the South American Calandrinia caespitosa complex (Montiaceae)". Phytotaxa. 203 (1): 1–23. doi:10.11646/phytotaxa.203.1.1. Wikidata Q23409515.
- Chae Haeng Park; Kyung Mo Kim; Elvebakk, Arve; Ok-Sun Kim; Gajin Jeong; Soon Gyu Hong (2014). "Algal and fungal diversity in Antarctic lichens" (PDF). Journal of Eukaryotic Microbiology. 62 (2): 196–205. doi:10.1111/jeu.12159. PMID 25105247. Wikidata Q35221708.
