= Halecania lobulata =

Scientific classification
- Kingdom: Fungi
- Division: Ascomycota
- Class: Lecanoromycetes
- Order: Leprocaulales
- Family: Leprocaulaceae
- Genus: Halecania
- Species: H. lobulata

Binomial name
- Halecania lobulata van den Boom & Elix (2005)

Species of lichen-forming fungus

Halecania lobulata is a species of crustose lichen in the family Leprocaulaceae. The lichen forms small rosettes up to 5 mm across that grow over other crustose lichens on calcareous rocks, with a greyish to yellowish-brown surface that breaks into tiny leaf-like lobes at the margins. It produces isousnic acid and related compounds that give a yellow reaction when tested with potassium hydroxide solution. The species is known from North Korea and South Korea, where it grows on exposed rock outcrops in mixed forests and near waterfalls.

== Taxonomy ==
Halecania lobulata was described as a new species in 2005 by Pieter van den Boom and John Elix, as part of their study of rock-dwelling Halecania from Asia; in that paper they introduced both H. lobulata and H. pakistanica, noting that the former is also lichenicolous (lichen-dwelling). The type specimen of H. lobulata was collected by Siegfried Huneck in 1986 on a near-vertical granite wall beside a waterfall in the Isoonam-Tal, Mount Myohyang (North Korea), where it was growing over crustose lichens allied to Hymenelia; the holotype is deposited in the Graz herbarium (GZU).

Within Halecania, the species is characterised by its small, rosette-forming, distinctly lobulate thallus and its lichenicolous habit on Hymenelia on calcareous rock. In overall appearance it resembles species of the genus Solenopsora, but van den Boom and Elix pointed out that H. lobulata is readily distinguished by its halonate, single-septum ascospores and by its chemistry.

== Description ==
The thallus of Halecania lobulata forms small, tightly attached rosettes up to about 0.5 cm across and a few tenths of a millimetre thick. The centre is cracked to areolate, breaking towards the margin into small, leaf-like lobes that are flat to slightly convex and often slightly raised at the tips. The upper surface is smooth, matt to faintly shiny and greyish to yellowish brown, becoming a little paler when wet, and lacks a distinct upper cortex. In section, the upper part of the thallus is made up of dark brown fungal hyphae containing many tiny refractive granules, especially around the apothecia.

The photobiont layer is diffuse, with green algal cells filling most of the upper thallus, while the underside is pale brown and composed of loosely interwoven hyphae, sometimes bordered by a dark bluish-black prothallus. Apothecia are usually common near the centre, small (generally up to about 0.5 mm in diameter) and closely attached, with dark brown to almost black, non-pruinose discs surrounded by a thin, pale yellowish-brown thalline margin. The asci are of the Catillaria type and contain eight oblong-ellipsoid, 1-septate ascospores, each surrounded by a gelatinous halo that swells in potassium hydroxide KOH solution. Tiny immersed pycnidia produce short rod-shaped conidia, and chemically the thallus gives a K+ (yellow) reaction and contains isousnic acid as its main lichen product, together with smaller amounts of atranorin, confluentic, stictic and cryptostictic acids.

== Habitat and distribution ==
Halecania lobulata is a lichenicolous species that grows over Hymenelia on calcareous rock. The type material consists of numerous very small fragments scraped from crustose thalli on a granite wall, and no other associated lichen species were present in the collection. The locality is in the Myohyangsan area of North Korea; van den Boom and Elix noted that the summit of Myohyangsan reaches 1,909 m, but the precise altitude of the collection site was not specified. In 2015 Halecania lobulata was recorded from South Korea, on rock outcrops on Hoemunsan in North Jeolla Province at around 470 m elevation. At this site it grew on exposed rock on a steep, south-west-facing slope in mixed forest dominated by Quercus variabilis and Pinus densiflora, with other broadleaved trees and shrubs, where rock surfaces made up roughly a third of the slope.
