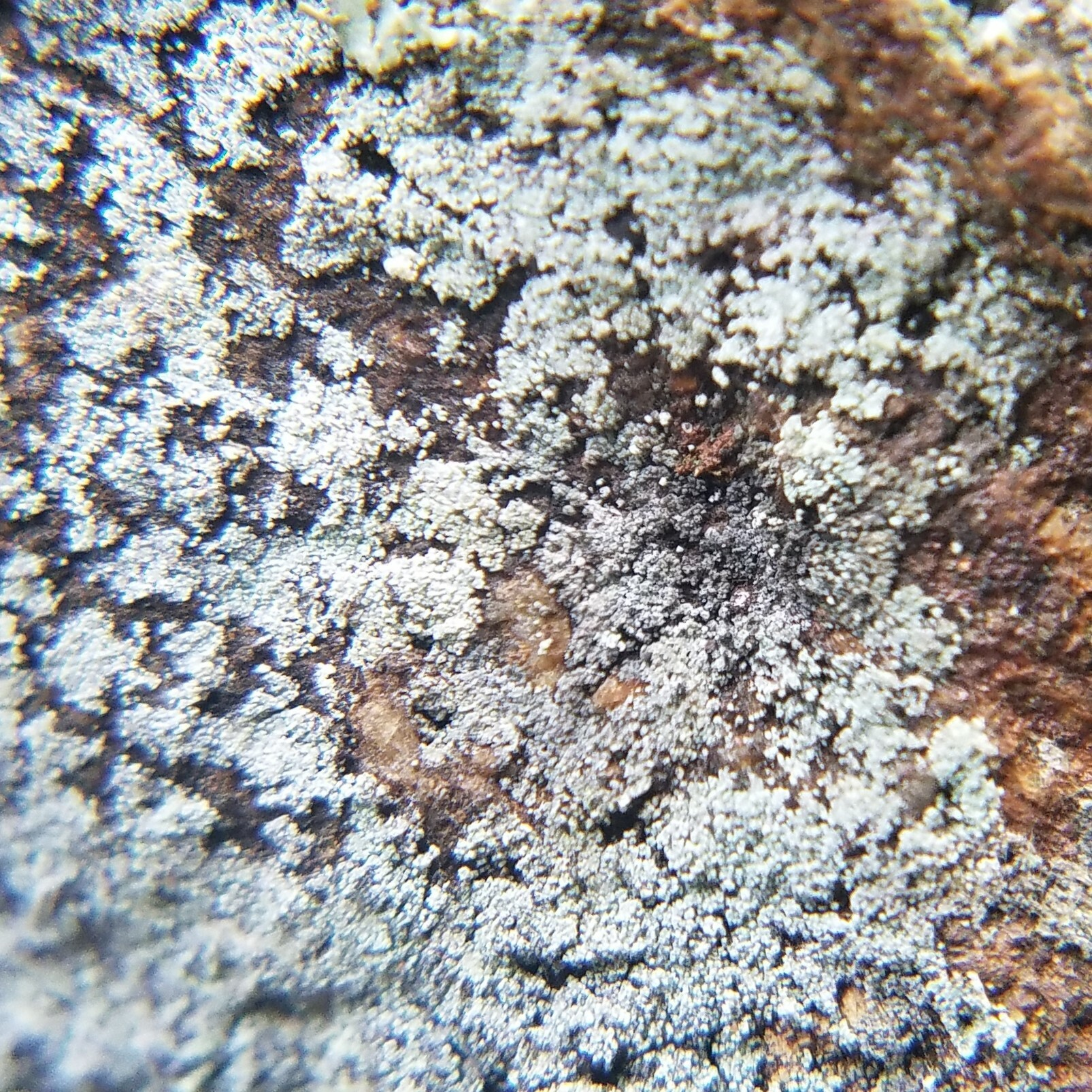

Scientific classification
- Kingdom: Fungi
- Division: Ascomycota
- Class: Lecanoromycetes
- Order: Leprocaulales
- Family: Leprocaulaceae
- Genus: Leprocaulon
- Species: L. adhaerens

Binomial name
- Leprocaulon adhaerens (K.Knudsen, Elix & Lendemer) Lendemer & B.P.Hodk. (2013)

Synonyms
- Lepraria adhaerens K.Knudsen, Elix & Lendemer (2007)

= Leprocaulon adhaerens =

Species of lichen

Leprocaulon adhaerens is a species of leprose lichen in the family Leprocaulaceae, found in North America. It was originally described in 2007 as Lepraria adhaerens and later transferred to the genus Leprocaulon in 2013 based on molecular and morphological studies. The lichen forms a granular crust that adheres tightly to both the substrate (usually rocks) and itself, often growing over mosses and other lichens. It is chemically distinct due to its production of pannarin, zeorin, and several minor secondary metabolites. The species is known from coastal southern California, Pennsylvania, and Missouri, though its distribution may be more extensive than currently documented.

== Taxonomy ==
The species was described as new to science by the lichenologists Kerry Knudsen, John A. Elix, and James Lendemer in 2007; it was originally classified in the genus Lepraria. The type specimen was collected in the United States, in California's San Diego County, within Torrey Pines State Natural Reserve at an elevation of 107 m (351 ft). It was found in a thin-soiled opening in maritime chaparral on sandstone bluffs, growing over Rinodina intermedia, Lepraria xerophila, bryophytes, and soil. The specimen, collected on April 13, 2005 by Knudsen and colleagues (specimen number 2700), is preserved as the holotype in the UC Riverside Herbarium (UCR). The specific epithet adhaerens is derived from its Latin meaning, referring to the way the granules adhere both to the substrate and to each other.

Lendemer and Brendan Hodkinson transferred the species to the genus Leprocaulon in 2013 as part of a major revision of the classification of leprose lichens.

== Description ==
The lichen forms a granular, crust-like growth without defined edges or lobes. While it lacks a true medulla, older specimens develop a lower necral layer of gelatinised granules. A distinctive feature of this species is the presence of small attaching hyphae that act as anchors or rhizines, causing the granules (soredia) to adhere to one another and to the surface they grow on. The soredia are abundant, measuring 40–100 μm in diameter, and tend to clump together.

While Leprocaulon adhaerens is rarely found with apothecia (fruiting bodies), a fertile specimen was documented in San Benito County, California. The apothecia range from blackish-brown to reddish-brown, sometimes with a light pruina, and have a distinct, raised lecideine margin. As they mature, they become strongly convex, with the margin turning under. The thalline exciple is absent or reduced to fragments of thallus adhering to the proper exciple. The asci, which are of the Halecania-type, react I+ blue, with a thickened I+ blue dome. The ellipsoid, 1-septate ascospores measure 10–13 by 3.5–5 μm.

The main secondary metabolites in L. adhaerens are pannarin and zeorin, though zeorin may occasionally be absent or present only in trace amounts. Additional minor compounds include norpannarin, dechloropannarin, hypopannarin and atranorin. Chemical spot tests results are K−, C−, KC−, and Pd+ (orange).

== Habitat and distribution ==
Leprocaulon adhaerens typically grows on rocks, usually over mosses and lichens, and rarely on soil. It is found in open habitats exposed to rain and sunlight, though in snowy areas it occurs in more sheltered locations. The species is known to occur only in North America. It has been recorded in coastal southern California, from the Santa Monica Mountains south to San Diego, as well as in scattered locations in Pennsylvania and Missouri. Its known distribution may be influenced by collection efforts rather than its actual range. Due to its frequent association with bryophytes, L. adhaerens may often be overlooked or undercollected, and is likely to be more widespread across North America than records indicate.
