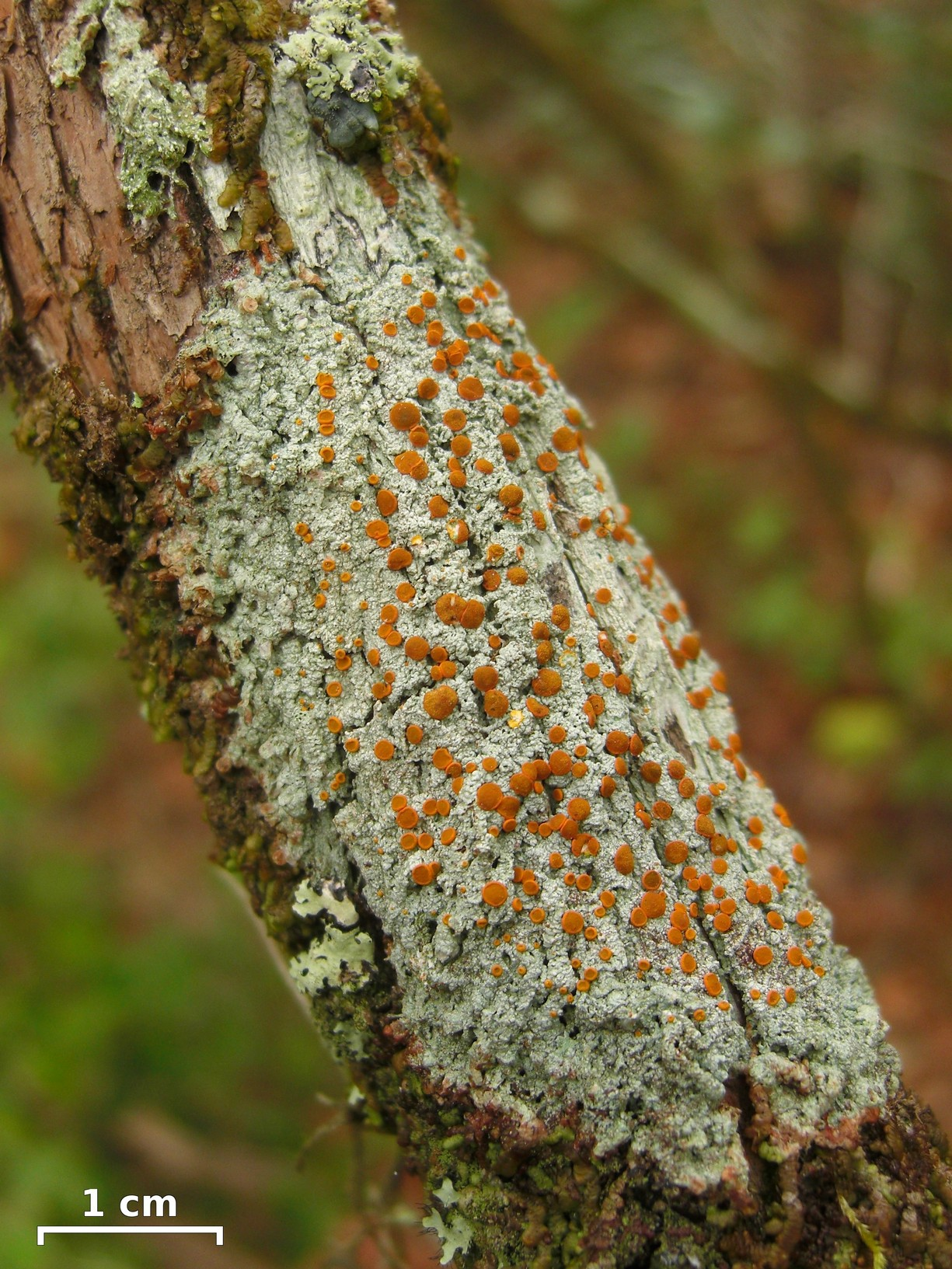
- Brigantiaea leucoxantha on oak bark

Scientific classification
- Kingdom: Fungi
- Division: Ascomycota
- Class: Lecanoromycetes
- Order: Teloschistales
- Family: Brigantiaeaceae
- Genus: Brigantiaea; Trevis. (1853)

Type species
- Brigantiaea tricolor (Mont.) Trevis. (1853)

Synonyms
- Myxodictyon A.Massal. (1860); Myxodictyonomyces Cif. & Tomas. (1953)

= Brigantiaea =

Genus of lichen

Brigantiaea is a genus of lichen-forming fungi in the family Brigantiaeaceae. The genus was established in 1853 by the Italian botanist Vittore Trevisan and is named after Francesco Briganti, a professor at the University of Naples. These lichens are recognised by their bright yellow to orange fruiting bodies that stand out against their crusty, wart-textured surface.

== Taxonomy ==
It was circumscribed by the Italian botanist Vittore Benedetto Antonio Trevisan de Saint-Léon in 1853. Trevisan distinguished Brigantiaea from other genera in the group by its distinctive spore walls (spore murali). In his original description, he included five species in the new genus: B. mariae (designated as the type species), B. berteroana, B. tricolor, B. argentea, and B. tristis. These species were all transfers from the genus Biatora. Trevisan noted that B. mariae could be found growing on tree bark (Ad arborum cortices) in the Cape of Good Hope region, as recorded by Johann Franz Drège's collections.

The genus name Brigantiaea honours Francesco Briganti (1802–1865), an Italian botanist and professor at the University of Naples.

== Description ==
Brigantiaea forms a wart-textured crust (verrucose thallus) that spreads thinly over bark or rock. Its internal green algal partner is single-celled with rounded cells about 6–14 μm across. The lichen's fruit bodies (apothecia) are abundant and distinctive: each is surrounded by a thick rim of radiating fungal filaments (the exciple) and capped by a flat disc coloured bright yellow, orange, or rusty brown. Under the microscope the supporting hyphae of the rim are conspicuously broad and brick-like, while the tissue filling the disc (hamathecium) consists of slender, septate paraphyses that swell only slightly at their tips.

The asci are club-shaped cylinders, usually containing a single ascospore. Their tips stain deep blue in iodine—a true amyloid reaction—whereas the outer and inner ascus walls remain unstained. Spores are thin-walled, colourless, and muriform: they resemble tiny bricks because multiple cross-walls divide them into a mosaic of chambers. No specialised asexual structures (conidiomata) have been observed. Chemical tests detect β-orcinol depsides in the thallus and the orange pigment parietin concentrated in the apothecial discs, accounting for the vivid surface colours and the rapid purple reaction when treated with potassium hydroxide solution.

== Species ==
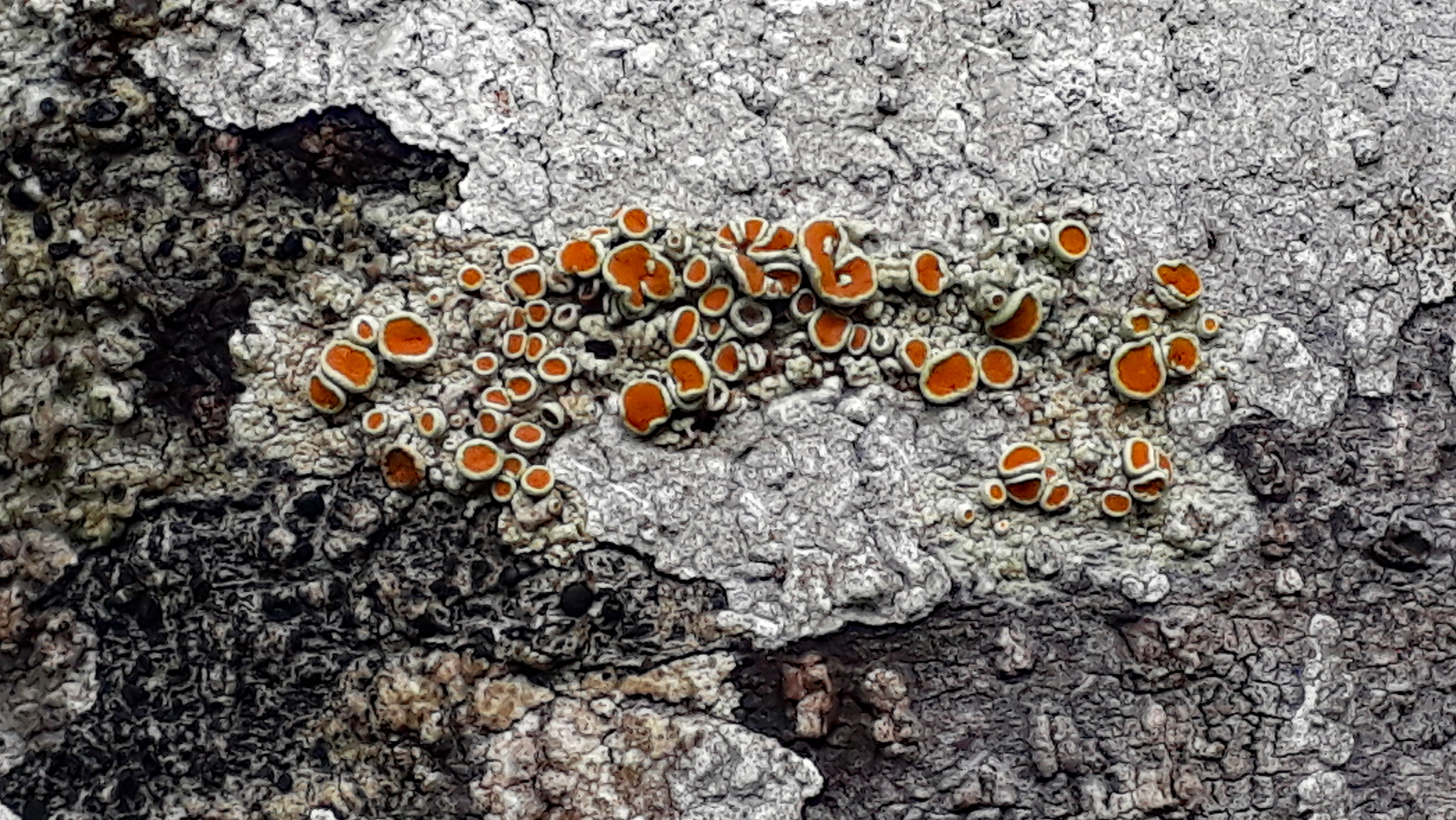
Brigantiaea chrysosticta

As of July 2025, Species Fungorum (in the Catalogue of Life) accept 13 species of Brigantiaea.

- Brigantiaea chrysosticta (Hook.f. & Taylor) Hafellner & Bellem. (1982)
- Brigantiaea crystallina Arup (2018) – South Korea
- Brigantiaea fuscolutea (Dicks.) R.Sant. (1981)
- Brigantiaea leprosa Kantvilas & Elix (2009)
- Brigantiaea leucoxantha (Spreng.) R.Sant. & Hafellner (1982)
- Brigantiaea isidiigera Hafellner (1997) – Fiji
- Brigantiaea leprosa Kantvilas & Elix (2009) – Australia
- Brigantiaea leucoxantha (Spreng.) R.Sant. & Hafellner (1982)
- Brigantiaea lobulata F.J.Walker & Hafellner (1983) – New Zealand
- Brigantiaea lobulatisidiata Aptroot (2007) – Thailand
- Brigantiaea lordhowensis Elix (2007) – Australia
- Brigantiaea mariae Trevis. (1853)
- Brigantiaea microcarpa (Räsänen) Hafellner (1997)
- Brigantiaea phaeomma (Nyl.) Hafellner (1997)
- Brigantiaea praetermissa Hafellner & St.Clair (1997) – USA
- Brigantiaea sorediata Kashiw., Mas.Inoue & K.H.Moon (2002) – Japan
- Brigantiaea subobscurata (Vain.) Aptroot (2002)
- Brigantiaea tricolor (Mont.) Trevis. (1853)
