= Lecania juniperi =

Scientific classification
- Kingdom: Fungi
- Division: Ascomycota
- Class: Lecanoromycetes
- Order: Lecanorales
- Family: Ramalinaceae
- Genus: Lecania
- Species: L. juniperi

Binomial name
- Lecania juniperi van den Boom (2012)

Species of lichen

Lecania juniperi is a rare species of corticolous (bark-dwelling), crustose lichen in the family Ramalinaceae. Discovered on Juniperus phoenicea shrubs in the coastal region of Portugal, it was formally described as a new species in 2012. Despite its resemblance to Lecania cyrtella, L. juniperi stands out due to its warted and sorediate thallus, larger apothecia, and distinct ascospores.

== Taxonomy ==
Lecania juniperi was first described by Dutch lichenologist Pieter van den Boom as a new species in 2012. The type specimen was discovered in the Algarve region of Portugal, near Odeceixe, on a Juniperus phoenicea shrub. The species name juniperi is derived from the host genus of the lichen.

== Description ==
The thallus of Lecania juniperi is corticolous, measuring approximately 1 cm wide and up to 0.5 mm thick. The areoles range in colour from pale grey to greyish brown, and the upper surface can be smooth or prominently warted. The apothecia can reach up to 0.8 mm in diameter, with a persistent margin that is paler than the disc. The ascospores are ellipsoid to somewhat ovoid, contains either a single septum or none, and typically measures 9–14 by 3.5–5 μm.

Lecania juniperi is chemically unreactive, showing no reactions with common lichen spot tests (K−, C−, KC−, and P−) and containing no detectable chemical substances.

=== Similar species ===
This lichen is a part of the Lecania cyrtella group, which also includes two sorediate (saxicolous) species, L. erysibe and L. leprosa. Lecania juniperi differs from these species due to its warted thallus, larger apothecia, and wider ascospores. In the field, L. juniperi can be readily confused with L. naegelii or an underdeveloped specimen of L. viridulogranulosa. However, L. naegelii has 3-septate ascospores and a non-lecanorine excipulum, while L. viridulogranulosa has a sorediate thallus and also ascospores with three septa.

== Habitat and distribution ==
Lecania juniperi is found exclusively on thin branches of Juniperus phoenicea shrubs, in open and exposed areas along the Atlantic Coast of Portugal, at an elevation of approximately 50 m (160 ft). At the time of its publication, it was only known to exist in the type locality. The lichen can be found growing alongside other species such as Caloplaca chrysophthalma, Diploicia canescens, Lecanora spp., Opegrapha xerica, and Opegrapha spp.
