= Leprocaulon coriense =

Scientific classification
- Kingdom: Fungi
- Division: Ascomycota
- Class: Lecanoromycetes
- Order: Leprocaulales
- Family: Leprocaulaceae
- Genus: Leprocaulon
- Species: L. coriense

Binomial name
- Leprocaulon coriense (Hue) Lendemer & B.P.Hodk. (2013)

Synonyms
- Crocynia coriensis Hue (1924); Lecanora coriensis (Hue) J.R.Laundon (2003); Lepraria coriensis (Hue) Sipman (2004)

Species of lichen

Leprocaulon coriense is a species of leprose lichen in the family Stereocaulaceae. It is found in Asia and Australia where it grows on various substrates, including rock, wood, bark, mosses and soil.

== Taxonomy ==
The species was first described as Crocynia coriensis by Auguste-Marie Hue in 1924. It was later transferred to Lecanora by Jack Laundon in 2003, and then to Lepraria by Harrie Sipman in 2004. The type material was collected in South Korea, with an isotype housed at the Kyoto University herbarium (KYO). The taxon was reclassified to the genus Leprocaulon in 2013 as a part of a larger restructuring of leprose genera.

== Description ==
This lichen forms a powdery to membranous crust with clearly defined edges. The margins feature distinctive lobes that are either obscure or, more commonly, well-developed, measuring 0.5–2 mm wide and having raised rims. It has a thin to medium-thick white medulla, and sometimes develops a thin, brown to black base layer (hypothallus). The surface may sometimes appear smooth in places where soredia are sparse, particularly near the margins. The reproductive structures consist of fine to coarse powder-like granules (soredia) up to 300 μm in diameter, which usually lack projecting threads (hyphae).

Three chemical variants have been identified. The most common contains usnic acid, zeorin, and protodehydroconstipatic and constipatic acids (in major to minor amounts), with isousnic acid and atranorin sometimes present in trace amounts. Other variants contain similar compounds but may also include argopsin, norargopsin, or caloploicin in varying amounts. Expected results for standard chemical spot tests are K−, C−, KC−, and Pd−.

== Habitat and distribution ==
Lepraria coriensis grows on various substrates including rock (mostly siliceous), wood, bark, mosses and soil. It is typically found in shaded and sheltered places. The species has been recorded from Asia (India, South Korea), China, Australia, and Yemen, primarily in tropical to subtropical regions.
