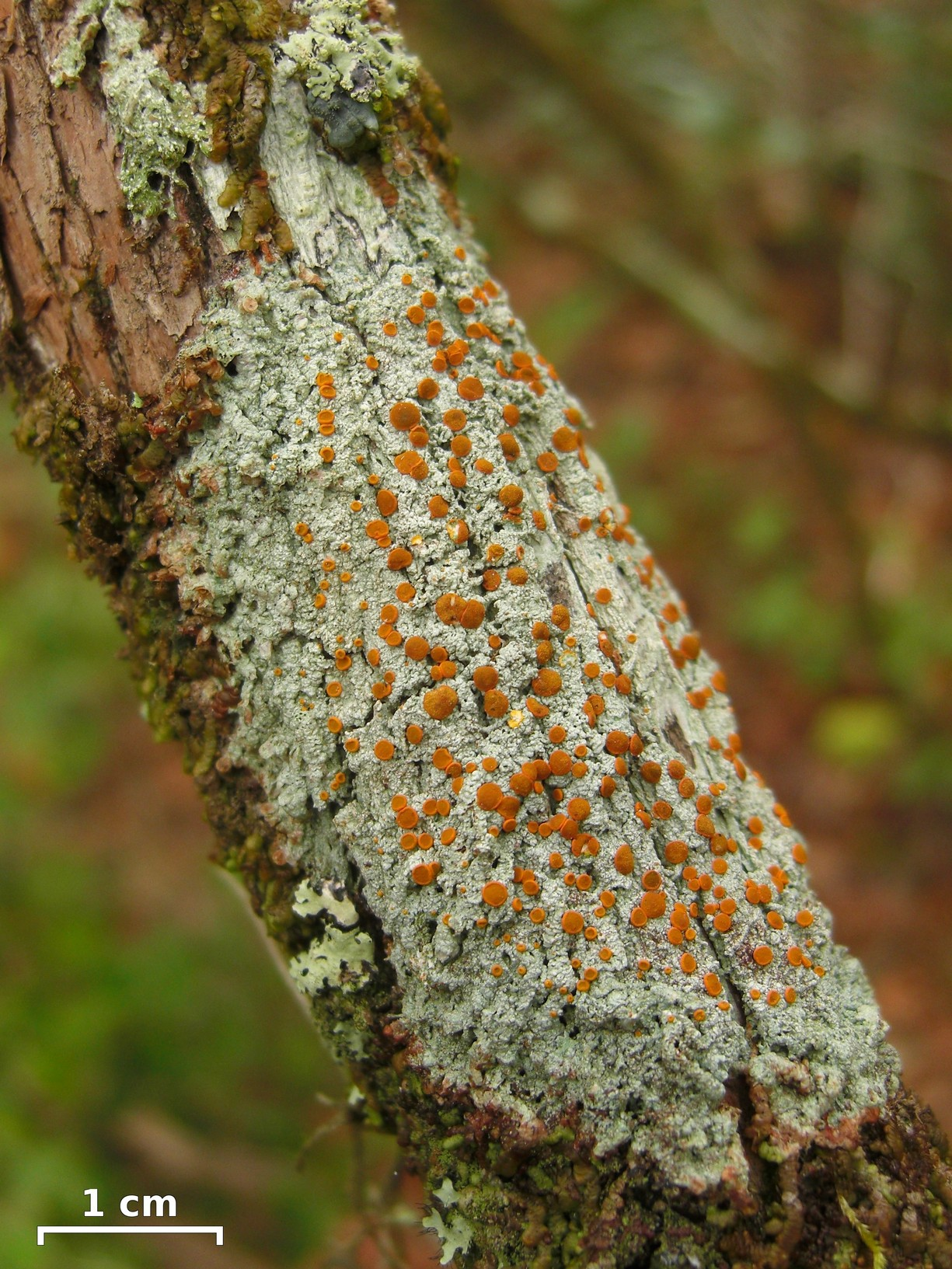
- in Ocala National Forest, Florida, USA

Conservation status
- Apparently Secure (NatureServe)

Scientific classification
- Domain: Eukaryota
- Kingdom: Fungi
- Division: Ascomycota
- Class: Lecanoromycetes
- Order: Teloschistales
- Family: Brigantiaeaceae
- Genus: Brigantiaea
- Species: B. leucoxantha

Binomial name
- Brigantiaea leucoxantha (Spreng.) R.Sant. & Hafellner (1982)

Synonyms
- Lecidea leucoxantha Spreng. (1820); Biatora leucoxantha (Spreng.) Bél. (1834); Heterothecium leucoxanthum (Spreng.) A.Massal. (1856); Lopadium leucoxanthum (Spreng.) Zahlbr. (1902); Miltidea leucoxantha (Spreng.) Stirt. (1898); Patellaria leucoxantha (Spreng.) Spreng. (1827); Sporopodium leucoxanthum (Spreng.) Vain. (1921); Xanthocarpia leucoxantha (Spreng.) Hampe (1857)

= Brigantiaea leucoxantha =

Species of lichen

Brigantiaea leucoxantha is a species of crustose lichen in the family Brigantiaeaceae. It was first described as a new species by German botanist Kurt Polycarp Joachim Sprengel in 1820, as Lecidea leucoxantha. Rolf Santesson and Josef Hafellner transferred it to the genus Brigantiaea in 1982.
