= Speerschneidera =

Conservation status
- Apparently Secure (NatureServe)

Scientific classification
- Kingdom: Fungi
- Division: Ascomycota
- Class: Lecanoromycetes
- Order: Leprocaulales
- Family: Leprocaulaceae
- Genus: Speerschneidera; Trevis. (1861)
- Species: S. euploca

Binomial name
- Speerschneidera euploca (Tuck.) Trevis. (1861)

Synonyms
- Physcia euploca Tuck. (1858); Teloschistes euplocus (Tuck.) Zahlbr. (1908)

Single-species lichen genus

Speerschneidera is a single-species fungal genus that contains the saxicolous (rock-dwelling) crustose lichen Speerschneidera euploca. It is known from scattered localities in the south-central United States and Mexico, where it grows on shaded calcareous outcrops. The genus has had an unstable family placement: it was traditionally placed in Leprocaulaceae, but a 2025 multi-gene phylogenetic study recovered it in Catillariaceae and treated Leprocaulaceae as a synonym.

== Taxonomy ==
The genus was circumscribed by the Italian botanist Vittore Benedetto Antonio Trevisan de Saint-Léon in 1861, with Speerschneidera euploca as the type species. This lichen was originally described by Edward Tuckerman in 1858 as Physcia euploca, from material collected in Texas. The genus name Speerschneidera honours German doctor, teacher and naturalist Julius Ferdinand Speerschneider (1825–1903). He worked as a curator of Frederick Charles, Prince of Schwarzburg-Rudolstadt's natural history collection which later became the Natural History Museum in Rudolstadt.

Because earlier authors relied heavily on thallus form and ascospore septation, the species was often treated as a member of Teloschistes (family Teloschistaceae). Josef Hafellner and Robert Egan later re-examined the lichen using light microscopy and scanning electron microscopy, and showed that it produces lecanoralean apothecia with Lecanora-type asci, indicating that it is not closely related to Teloschistes. On the basis of these characters (together with ecology and chemistry), they considered Speerschneidera best placed among lecanoroid lichens, with its closest affinities to the crustose genus Lecania.

A 2025 multi-gene phylogenetic study re-evaluated the limits of Catillariaceae and related families using improved taxon sampling, including type species, and recovered Speerschneidera within Catillariaceae. The authors consequently treated Leprocaulaceae as a synonym of Catillariaceae, yielding a revised circumscription based in part on shared asci and paraphysis characters.

== Description ==
The thallus of Speerschneidera forms regular, circular rosettes about 7–12 cm across. These are built from narrow lobes 0.2–0.5 mm thick that usually branch in two at short intervals; three-way branching is uncommon. The upper surface is smooth and grey to brownish-grey (turning grey-green when moist), while the underside is paler and has a fine, fibrillar texture. The thallus is attached to the rock at irregular intervals by adhesive strands. In cross section, much of the thallus is occupied by a strongly developed upper cortex of densely interwoven fungal tissue (scleroplectenchyma). This layer is typically 180–230 μm thick and makes up about one-half to four-fifths of the thallus thickness, while the lower cortex is thinner, at about 50–70 μm. The green algal partner is embedded in the medulla in clusters about 100 μm tall, interspersed with fungal hyphae. Josef Poelt interpreted the prominent, hyaline strand-like tissues in Speerschneidera as functioning mainly in water retention rather than acting purely as a mechanical support.

Apothecia develop chiefly in the branch axils (less often near lobe tips or edges) and, as they mature, may appear centred on the narrow lobes. Mature apothecia are about 0.5–2.0 mm across with a flat to sometimes convex, reddish-brown disc, and they are built in the lecanoralean manner. The asci are of the Lecanora type, typically 35–45 × 8–12 μm and usually eight-spored. The paraphyses have slightly swollen, brown-pigmented tips, and the ascospores are hyaline and usually 2-celled (c. 9–15 × 3–5 μm). These ascus and paraphysis traits are comparable with those used in recent phylogenetic classifications to circumscribe Catillariaceae. Pycnidia are immersed and develop along the margin of the upper cortex. They produce hyaline, cylindrical conidia about 3–4 × 1–1.5 μm that are not released in a slimy mass.

In thin-layer chromatography, Hafellner and Egan detected no characteristic lichen substances in the material they examined. The chromatograms showed only a minor spot corresponding to the brown pigment in the paraphyses, which Culberson considered unrelated to parietin. All standard spot test reactions were negative.

== Habitat and ecology ==
Speerschneidera euploca grows on calcareous rock, typically on shaded, steep, north-facing exposures, and is rarely collected and apparently uncommon. When dry it is easily overlooked because its color blends with limestone, but when wet it becomes bright green. In central Texas it was reported from juniper-shaded north-facing outcrops, growing alongside Dermatocarpon minimum and species of Collema and Verrucaria. Hafellner and Egan recorded it from the St. Louis area of Missouri south-west through Kansas, Oklahoma and Texas to a single locality in Jalisco, Mexico, with no records reported outside the United States and Mexico.
