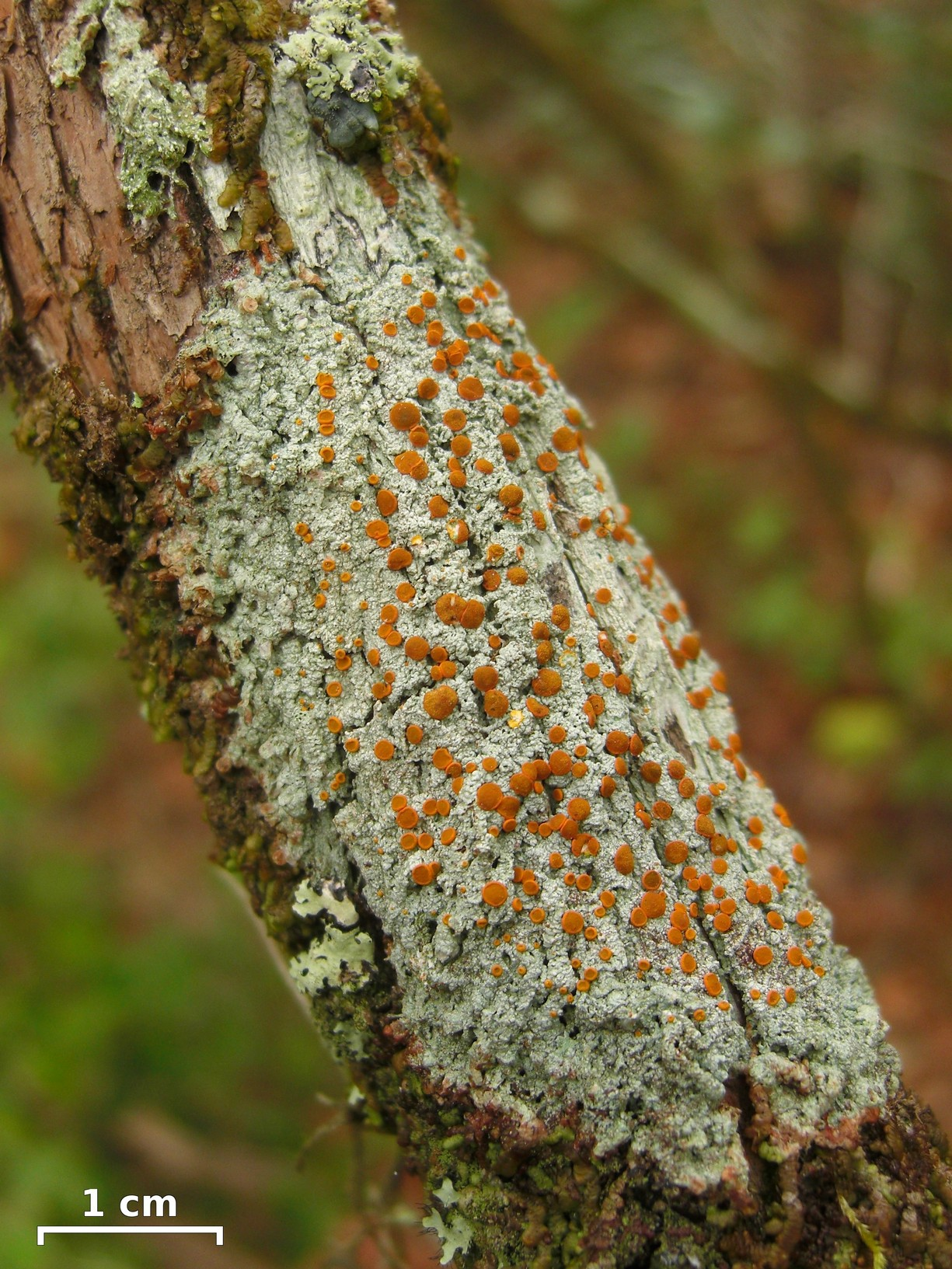

Scientific classification
- Kingdom: Fungi
- Division: Ascomycota
- Class: Lecanoromycetes
- Order: Teloschistales
- Family: Brigantiaeaceae; Hafellner & Bellem. (1982)

Type genus
- Brigantiaea Trevis. (1853)

Genera
- Argopsis; Brigantiaea

= Brigantiaeaceae =

Family of fungi

The Brigantiaeaceae are a family of fungi in the order Teloschistales. Species in this family are lichenized with green algae, and are usually found growing on bark.
