= Halecania athallina =

Scientific classification
- Domain: Eukaryota
- Kingdom: Fungi
- Division: Ascomycota
- Class: Lecanoromycetes
- Order: Leprocaulales
- Family: Leprocaulaceae
- Genus: Halecania
- Species: H. athallina

Binomial name
- Halecania athallina Fryday (2020)

Species of lichen

Halecania athallina is a species of lichen in the family Leprocaulaceae. Unlike most lichens, this species has no visible crust and can only be detected by its tiny, dark reddish-brown fruiting bodies that appear scattered on the rock surface. It was discovered in 2020 in Alaska's Glacier Bay National Park and Preserve and remains known only from that region's alpine heath environments.

== Taxonomy ==
The lichen was described as new to science in 2020 by British lichenologist Alan Fryday. The type specimen was discovered in Hoonah-Angoon Census Area in Glacier Bay National Park. There it was found growing on argillite rock on an alpine heath with rock outcrops. The thallus of this lichen is completely immersed in its substrate. The specific epithet athallina refers to this characteristic absence of a thallus.

== Description ==
Halecania athallina shows itself only through its fruiting bodies, as it lacks a visible vegetative crust (its epithet literally means "without a thallus"). The tiny, lecideine apothecia—so called because they have a proper margin but no rim formed by the missing thallus—are scattered singly across the substrate. Each disc is dark reddish-brown, roundish to angular, and just 0.3–0.4 mm across, with a persistent, slightly raised edge about 0.05 mm wide. In section the exciple is nearly clear inside, built from slender, interwoven hyphae about 1 micrometres (μm) thick, but its outermost 10 μm turn brown as the hyphae expand into short cortical cells capped by dark pigment, a pattern echoed at the tips of the hymenial filaments.

The hymenium rises 35–40 μm and is overlaid by a 5–10 μm brown epihymenium. Straight, unbranched paraphyses thread the spore layer; they start only 1–1.5 μm wide but swell abruptly to 3–4 μm at the apex, where the same brown pigment forms a minute cap. Beneath lies a clear hypothecium about 30 μm tall. The asci are of the Catillaria type: slightly club-shaped, two-walled, and eight-spored, measuring 30–35 × 12–18 μm. Their contents show no color change in iodine solutions (I−, KI−). The mature ascospores are hyaline, smooth, and divided by a single cross-wall )(septum); they are 9.5–14.5 μm long and 3.5–5.5 μm wide, most commonly around 12 × 4.7 μm, giving a length-to-width ratio near 2.5. Each spore is wrapped in a very thin outer envelope (perispore). No asexual reproductive structures (conidiomata) have been observed.

Standard spot tests are negative on Halecania athallina: sections placed in potassium hydroxide (K), sodium hypochlorite (C), or para-phenylenediamine (PD) do not change color, and thin-layer chromatography detects no recognizable lichen products, only an unidentified trace compound that runs in various solvent classes.

The most morphologically similar lichen is Halecania rhypodiza, but this species has a dark brown thallus and larger spores measuring 12–15 by 4.5–6 μm.

== Habitat and distribution ==
Halecania athallina is only known to occur in Alaska, where it grows on rocks in alpine heath.
