= Leprocaulon beechingii =

Scientific classification
- Domain: Eukaryota
- Kingdom: Fungi
- Division: Ascomycota
- Class: Lecanoromycetes
- Order: Leprocaulales
- Family: Leprocaulaceae
- Genus: Leprocaulon
- Species: L. beechingii

Binomial name
- Leprocaulon beechingii Lendemer (2020)

Species of lichen

Leprocaulon beechingii is a species of saxicolous (rock-dwelling), leprose lichen in the family Leprocaulaceae. Found in the southern Appalachian Mountains of eastern North America, it was formally described as a new species in 2020 by lichenologist James Lendemer. Its main distinguishing physical characteristic is the placodioid thallus of the normandinoides-type, with raised, crisp margins. Chemically, it contains the secondary chemical products zeorin and usnic acid. The latter of these substances gives the thallus a greenish-yellow colouration.
