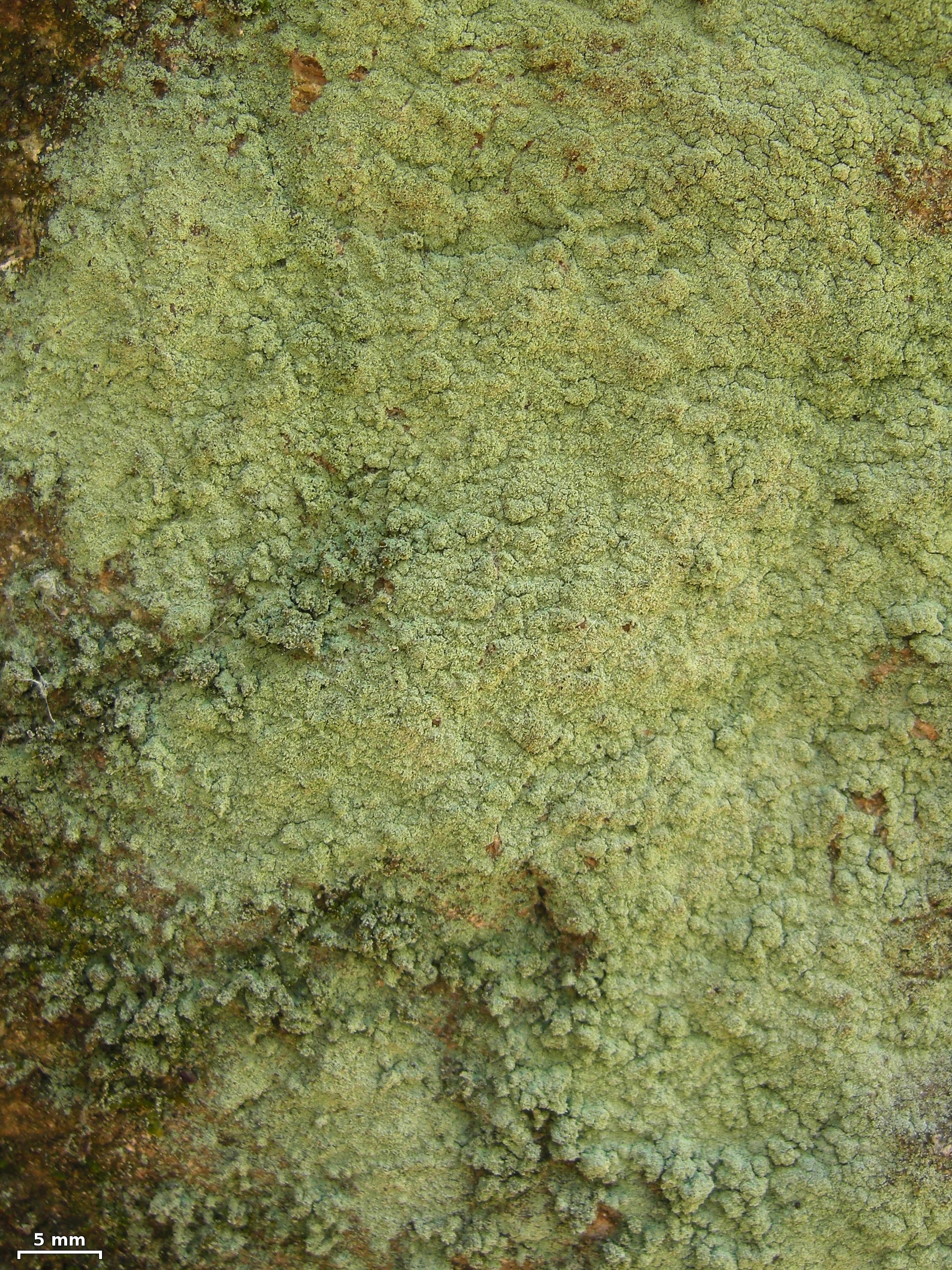
- Leprocaulon knudsenii in southern California

Scientific classification
- Kingdom: Fungi
- Division: Ascomycota
- Class: Lecanoromycetes
- Order: Leprocaulales
- Family: Leprocaulaceae
- Genus: Leprocaulon; Nyl. ex Lamy (1879)

Type species
- Leprocaulon nanum (Ach.) Nyl. (1879)

= Leprocaulon =

Genus of lichens

Leprocaulon is a genus of lichen-forming fungi in the family Leprocaulaceae. Members of the genus Leprocaulon are commonly called cottonthread lichens. These small lichens typically form soft, powdery coatings on their growing surfaces, sometimes developing tiny white thread-like structures that create a cottony appearance. The genus contains eleven recognised species found primarily in North America and Europe.

== Taxonomy ==
The genus Leprocaulon was established by the Finnish lichenologist William Nylander and published by Edmond Lamy in 1879. The genus was circumscribed in Lamy's "Reasoned catalogue of the lichens of Mont-Dore and Haute-Vienne" (Catalogue raisonné des lichens du Mont-Dore et de la Haute-Vienne) published in the Bulletin de la Société Botanique de France in 1878, though the publication year of the genus indicates 1879. The genus name was apparently communicated by Nylander to Lamy through correspondence, as Nylander had not formally published the name Leprocaulon himself, but had merely noted in 1876 that Stereocaulon nanum was not a true Stereocaulon but resembled "a peculiar Lepraria".

The type species is Leprocaulon nanum, which was originally based on Lichen nanus described by Erik Acharius. According to Lamy's original description, Leprocaulon is characterised by small, delicate stems that may be simple or branched, sometimes partially denuded, with whitish powdery granules. The yellowing of the thallus when treated with potassium hydroxide serves as a diagnostic feature that distinguishes this genus from the closely related Stereocaulon—a reaction that is characteristically absent in Leprocaulon species.

Prior to the establishment of Leprocaulon, Theodor Magnus Fries had recognised the distinctive nature of these species in 1857 when he placed them in a separate section of Stereocaulon called sect. Chondrocaulon, distinguished by their cartilaginous pseudopodetia and granular phyllocladia that typically break down into powdery particles. However, since Chondrocaulon was published only at sectional rank, Nylander's later generic name Leprocaulon takes nomenclatural precedence.

== Description ==
Leprocaulon species begin as a soft, diffuse coat of microscopic granules—technically called a leprose primary thallus—that spreads across the substrate like a pale dusting of powder. This layer lacks the organised upper and lower "skin" (cortex) seen in many lichens, giving it a loose, felt-like texture. In some species the primary thallus develops a delicate secondary structure: countless white, thread-thin stems (pseudopodetia) that stand upright, branch repeatedly and weave together into a tiny, cottony turf. The cylindrical pseudopodetia have a slightly cartilaginous texture and are densely covered with the same powdery reproductive structures—soredia and floccose tomentum—that coat the base. The internal photosynthetic partner is a green alga of the genus Trebouxia.

Fertile populations of Leprocaulon produce small, rimmed discs (lecanorine apothecia) whose internal anatomy matches the Catillaria-type: eight-spored asci with an outer iodine-positive layer and colourless (hyaline), septate spores. Asexual pycnidia have not been observed. Chemically the genus is diverse; thin-layer chromatography reveals an array of depsides, depsidones, phloroglucinol pigments, triterpenoids and fatty acids, although the exact profile varies between species and may aid identification when morphology alone is ambiguous.

== Species ==
As of June 2025, Species Fungorum (in the Catalogue of Life) accepts 11 species of Leprocaulon:

- Leprocaulon adhaerens (K.Knudsen, Elix & Lendemer) Lendemer & B.P.Hodk. (2013)
- Leprocaulon americanum Lendemer & B.P.Hodk. (2013)
- Leprocaulon beechingii Lendemer (2020) – eastern North America
- Leprocaulon calcicola Earl.-Benn., Orange, C.J.B.Hitch & Mark Powell (2017) – Great Britain
- Leprocaulon coriense (Hue) Lendemer & B.P.Hodk. (2013)
- Leprocaulon inexpectatum Gheza, Malíček, Vančurová & H.Mayrhofer (2025) – Italy
- Leprocaulon knudsenii Lendemer & B.P.Hodk. (2013) – mountain ranges of central and southern California, USA
- Leprocaulon nicholsiae Lendemer & E.Tripp (2018)
- Leprocaulon santamonicae (K.Knudsen & Elix) Lendemer & B.P.Hodk. (2013)
- Leprocaulon terricola (Lendemer) Lendemer & B.P.Hodk. (2013)
- Leprocaulon textum (K.Knudsen, Elix & Lendemer) Lendemer & B.P.Hodk. (2013)
