= Lecania madida =

Scientific classification
- Domain: Eukaryota
- Kingdom: Fungi
- Division: Ascomycota
- Class: Lecanoromycetes
- Order: Lecanorales
- Family: Ramalinaceae
- Genus: Lecania
- Species: L. madida

Binomial name
- Lecania madida Reese Næsb. & Björk (2008)

Species of lichen

Lecania madida is a species of saxicolous (bark-dwelling), crustose lichen in the family Ramalinaceae. It occurs in the Pacific Northwest region of Canada and the United States, where it grows in moist habitats.

The lichen was formally described as a new species in 2008 by Rikke Reese Næsborg and Curtis Björk. The type specimen was collected from Wells Gray Provincial Park in British Columbia, where it was found in a swamp growing on a hardwood root buttress of Populus trichocarpa. The species epithet madida is derived from the word madidus, meaning "moist" or "wet", and refers to the lichen's habitat.

Lecania leprosa has been recorded from humid habitats of British Columbia and western Montana, but the authors speculate that it probably also occurs in the US states of Oregon, Washington, Idaho, and California. It has been found on the bark of Populus trichocarpa, Cornus stolonifera, Alnus incana, and Thuja plicata.
