= Haploloma =

Scientific classification
- Kingdom: Fungi
- Division: Ascomycota
- Class: Lecanoromycetes
- Order: incertae sedis
- Family: incertae sedis
- Genus: Haploloma; Trevis. (1857)
- Species: H. fraudulentum

Binomial name
- Haploloma fraudulentum Trevis. (1857)

Genus of lichens

Haploloma is a fungal genus of unknown familial and ordinal placement in the class Lecanoromycetes. It contains the single species Haploloma fraudulentum, a lichen.

== Taxonomy ==
Both the genus and its sole species were introduced to science by the Italian botanist Vittore Benedetto Antonio Trevisan de Saint-Léon in 1857. He described the genus as follows: "Apothecia scattered, distinct, circular, shaped like a small dish, sessile and attached, bordered by its own carbonaceous cup-shaped margin, parasitising other lichens. The disc is always open, situated on a simple, very black hypothecium. The asci are club-shaped, eight-spored, mixed with paraphyses. The spores are ovoid-ellipsoidal, single-celled, transparent, with a colourless episporium and a simple nucleus."

As of 2017, there is no molecular sequence data available for this genus, and it remains poorly known. It is considered to be of uncertain (incertae sedis) placement in the order Lecanoromycetes.
