= Lecania hydrophobica =

Scientific classification
- Kingdom: Fungi
- Division: Ascomycota
- Class: Lecanoromycetes
- Order: Lecanorales
- Family: Ramalinaceae
- Genus: Lecania
- Species: L. hydrophobica

Binomial name
- Lecania hydrophobica T.Sprib. & Fryday (2020)

Species of lichen

Lecania hydrophobica is a species of crustose lichen in the family Ramalinaceae. This species was found in 2020 growing on shale cliffs in Alaska's Glacier Bay National Park. Its most distinctive feature is a hydrophobic surface that repels water, created by tiny wax-like filaments covering the lichen. The species forms small, dome-shaped patches with cream-colored centers and darker gray edges, and is known from coastal areas of Alaska and British Columbia.

== Taxonomy ==
The lichen was described as a new species in 2020 by Toby Spribille and Alan Fryday. The type specimen was collected in the Hoonah–Angoon Census Area of Glacier Bay National Park and Preserve. Here it was found at an elevation of 9 m (30 ft) growing on a vertical shale outcrop. The specific epithet hydrophobic refers to the hydrophobic (water-repelling) properties of the lichen, which are possibly imparted by the wax-like filaments on the surface of the apothecial disc.

== Description ==
Lecania hydrophobica forms a thin, crust-like thallus that breaks into tiny dome-shaped areoles only 0.15–0.45 mm wide. Each areole is two-toned, with a darker gray rim and a cream-to-ochre center, and the colony as a whole often looks faintly blistered or granulated. The surface repels water, an effect traced to countless "spaghetti" filaments less than 100 nanometers across that weave through the interior and give the sterile hyphae a papillate (pimpled) appearance under high magnification. Internally the thallus is only loosely stratified: sparsely woven fungal threads sit directly beneath a very thin, biofilm-like cortex, and no differentiated outer skin (cortex) is present. The algal partner is a single-celled green alga with rounded cells 6–17 micrometers (μm) in diameter.

Round apothecia (fruiting bodies) rise singly from the thallus, well spaced and one-half to nearly 1 mm across. Young discs are flat and reddish-brown, surrounded by a thick, doughnut-like rim that is coated with the same waxy filaments that waterproof the thallus. As the apothecia mature the rim thins, giving a false "lecanorine" impression, and may eventually disappear, while the disc itself darkens to gray-brown, sometimes mottled, and can become distinctly lumpy. The lateral wall (excipulum) is 60–100 μm thick, made of radiating, thick-walled hyphae that sparkle with internal crystals under polarized light; it shows no color change in iodine. Inside, a 60–120 μm tall hymenium contains tightly glued paraphyses that refuse to separate even in potassium hydroxide, and the epihymenium is packed with the same crystals, golden-brown in transmitted light.

The clear to pale yellow-brown hypothecium can reach 150 μm in height and is likewise studded with crystals. Eight-spored, Bacidia-type asci—about 50 × 10 μm—are hard to distinguish because of the gummy hamathecium, and many appear to be recycled into the growing tissue, so older hymenia ride atop earlier layers. Spores are one-septate and broadly ellipsoid, averaging 12–14 × 4–5 μm. Routine spot tests are negative, though the thallus shows a faint yellow glow under long-wave UV light, and thin-layer chromatography detects traces of atranorin and the rare pigment gangaleoidin. The combination of a hydrophobic, wax-filament thallus, crystal-rich apothecia, and an unusual secondary metabolite sets L. hydrophobica apart from other species in the genus.

== Habitat and distribution ==
Lecania hydrophobica is abundant on sheltered rock overhangs in the type locality, and is also known to occur further south – on southern Baranof Island, and on British Columbia's Calvert Island. It is one of six species of Lecania that has been documented in Alaska.
