= Lecania sessilisoraliata =

Scientific classification
- Kingdom: Fungi
- Division: Ascomycota
- Class: Lecanoromycetes
- Order: Lecanorales
- Family: Ramalinaceae
- Genus: Lecania
- Species: L. sessilisoraliata

Binomial name
- Lecania sessilisoraliata Yazıcı & Aptroot (2017)

Species of lichen

Lecania sessilisoraliata is a species of saxicolous (rock-dwelling), crustose lichen in the family Ramalinaceae. It is found on rock outcrops in the mountainous Burdur region of Turkey.

== Taxonomy ==
The lichen was formally described as a new species in 2017 by lichenologists André Aptroot and Kenan Yazıcı. The type specimen was collected by the second author near Esirlik village (Bucak, Burdur) at an altitude of 859 m (2,818 ft), where it was found growing on calcareous rock. The species is only known to occur in Turkey, usually on limestone. The species epithet refers to the characteristic sessile soralia (i.e., vegetative propagules lacking a stem or stalk and attached to the thallus surface).

== Description ==
The crust-like thallus of Lecania sessilisoraliata is pale olivaceous brown to pale olivaceous green and measures up to 2.5–3 cm (1.0–1.2 in) in diameter. The crust thickness is greatest at its centre, about 1–2 mm. The crust comprises smaller areoles crowded together, each measuring 0.2–0.6 mm in diameter. Whitish soralia are raised above the level of the thallus and are sessile; they are largely crowded towards the thallus centre measuring up to 0.8–1 mm in diameter. The soredia are granular, each measuring 30–50 μm in diameter. The asci contains eight spores and are of the Bacidia-type, with dimensions of 8.5–12 by 25.5–30 μm. Ascospores are hyaline, ellipsoid in shape with a single septum, and measure 8.5–9.8 by 2.4–3.1 μm.
