= Halecania pakistanica =

Scientific classification
- Kingdom: Fungi
- Division: Ascomycota
- Class: Lecanoromycetes
- Order: Leprocaulales
- Family: Leprocaulaceae
- Genus: Halecania
- Species: H. pakistanica

Binomial name
- Halecania pakistanica van den Boom & Elix (2005)

Species of lichen-forming fungus

Halecania pakistanica is a species of crustose lichen in the family Leprocaulaceae. The lichen forms irregular patches of small, closely packed angular segments with a pale brown to greyish-brown upper surface and scattered fruiting bodies up to 1 mm across. It grows on exposed limestone rocks at high elevations in the Karakoram mountains of northern Pakistan, where it was discovered at about 3,620 m elevation. As of 2012, it remained the only species of its genus recorded from Pakistan.

== Taxonomy ==
Halecania pakistanica was described as a new species in 2005 by Pieter van den Boom and John Elix. The description was based on material collected in 1991 from calcareous rock in the Rakaposhi-Haramosh Mountains (Baltistan, Pakistan) at an elevation of about 3,620 m; this collection serves as the holotype.

== Description ==
The thallus of Halecania pakistanica is crustose and distinctly areolate, forming irregular patches composed of small angular to rounded areoles about 0.2–1 mm across and up to about 0.3 mm thick. The areoles are usually closely packed, sometimes with their margins slightly raised or upturned, giving the surface a rough, uneven to weakly granular appearance. The upper surface is matt and pale brown, grey-brown or yellowish brown, and lacks a differentiated cortex or epinecral layer. Algal cells are scattered throughout the thallus rather than concentrated in a discrete layer, and a dark brown to blackish prothallus is often visible around the margin.

Apothecia (fruiting bodies) are common and range from about 0.2 to 1 mm in diameter, at first slightly immersed but soon broadly sessile and usually scattered on the thallus. The disc is mid- to dark brown, becoming paler and reddish brown when wet, and is plane to weakly concave when young, later becoming slightly convex; it lacks pruina. A thin, scalloped (crenulate) thalline margin develops in mature apothecia, the same colour as the thallus and remaining persistent. In section, the hymenium is about 50–60 μm tall and hyaline, overlain by a brown to red-brown epihymenium that does not react with K or N. The hypothecium is relatively high (about 150–200 μm including the subhymenium) and hyaline. Paraphyses are stuck together (conglutinated), only slightly thickened towards the tips, and have apical cells with brownish-black walls. Asci are of the Catillaria type, narrowly club-shaped (clavate), 8-spored, and have a uniformly amyloid apical dome when stained in iodine. Ascospores are oblong-ellipsoid to ellipsoid, typically 10–12 × 4–6.5 μm, 1-septate, thin-walled and surrounded by a distinct gelatinous halo (perispore) that swells in potassium hydroxide (KOH) solution and may be thickened at the septum. Pycnidia are infrequent, immersed and inconspicuous; the conidia are simple, short bacilliform spores about 2.5–3 μm long. No lichen secondary metabolites have been detected by thin-layer chromatography or high-performance liquid chromatography, and standard spot tests are negative.

=== Similar species ===
The authors distinguished H. pakistanica from the morphologically similar H. pepegospora by its clearly areolate, roughened thallus (rather than a granulate–warted crust), its somewhat larger apothecia and ascospores, and by the absence of detectable lichen substances. They also separated it from H. spodomela, which occurs on acidic rocks and has a greenish, N+ epithecium and a thallus of small granules associated with cyanobacteria, whereas H. pakistanica has a brown, N− epithecium and a pale brown to yellowish-brown crust on calcareous rock. Within the genus it belongs among the saxicolous species with lecanorine apothecia and halonate, 1-septate ascospores.

== Habitat and distribution ==
As of its original collection, Halecania pakistanica was known only from its type locality in the Haramosh Range of Baltistan, in the Karakoram of northern Pakistan. It grows on exposed calcareous rocks at high altitude around 3,620 m. The type collection was taken from rock in an alpine setting where the species occurred near, or possibly initially overgrowing, the cyanolichen species Placynthium nigrum; other associated lichens at the site include Lecidella stigmatea and a poorly developed Caloplaca species. Within this habitat the species appears to form an autonomous crust on the rock surface rather than remaining strictly lichenicolous. As of 2012, H. pakistanica was the only Halecania species reported from Pakistan.
