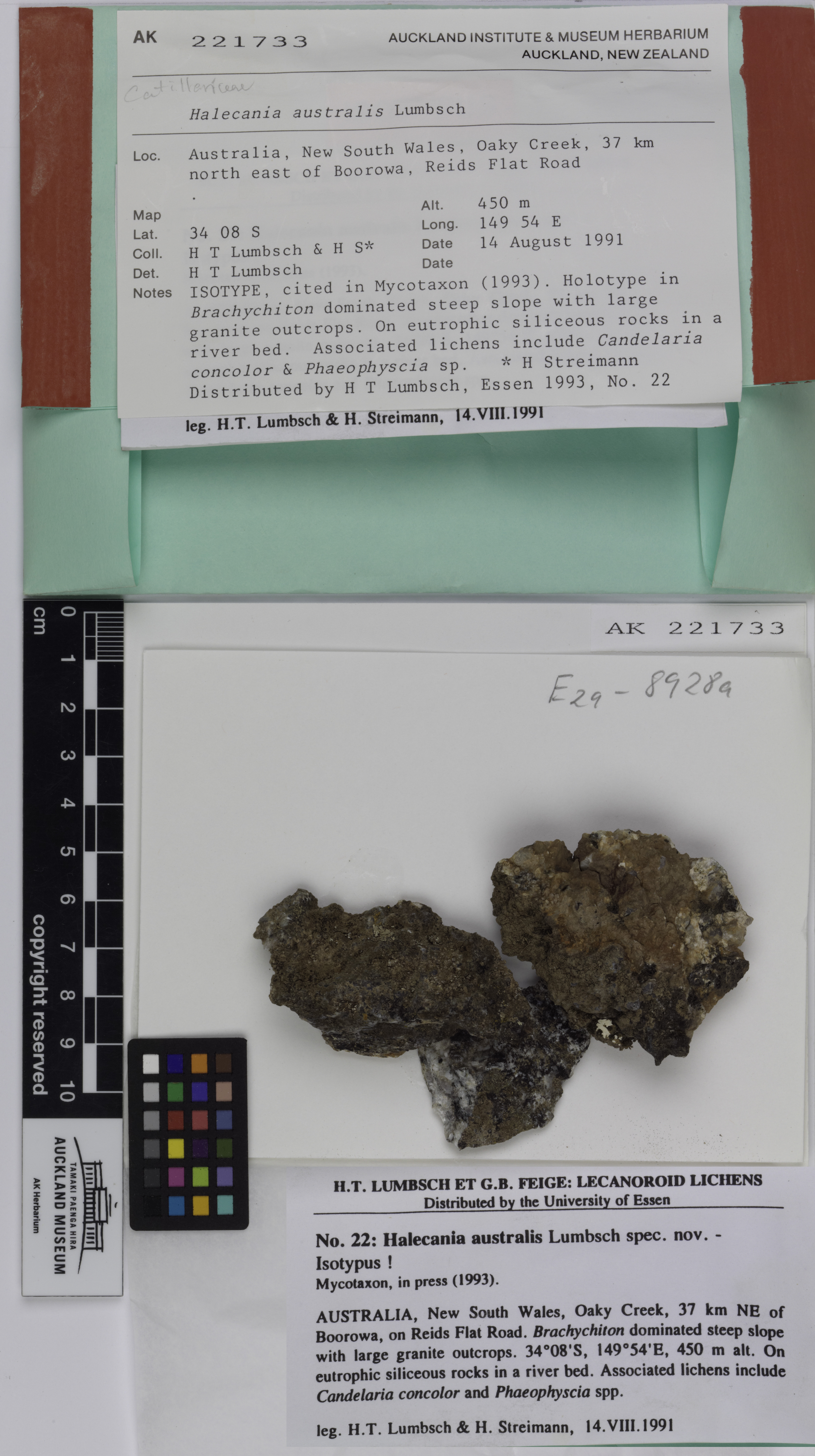
- Isotype of Halecania australis

Scientific classification
- Domain: Eukaryota
- Kingdom: Fungi
- Division: Ascomycota
- Class: Lecanoromycetes
- Order: Leprocaulales
- Family: Leprocaulaceae
- Genus: Halecania; M.Mayrhofer (1987)

Type species
- Halecania alpivaga (Th.Fr.) M.Mayrhofer (1987)

= Halecania =

Genus of lichen-forming fungi

Halecania is a genus of fungi in the family Leprocaulaceae. It has 24 species. These lichens form inconspicuous, crust-like films that spread over rock or other surfaces, with colours ranging from chalky white through bluish-grey to brownish-grey and textures that can be cracked like dried mud, granular, or covered in tiny warts. They reproduce through small, disc-shaped fruiting bodies that contain eight colourless ascospores divided by a single cross-wall, with the spore envelope swelling conspicuously when treated with certain chemicals—a key identifying feature.

== Taxonomy ==
The genus was circumscribed by the Austrian lichenologist Michaela Mayrhofer in 1987, with Halecania alpivaga assigned as the type species. She created Halecania to contain species, formerly placed in Lecania, with the following characteristics: uniformly amyloid apical domes, paraphyses with dark brown apical caps, and halonate ascospores (i.e., surrounded by a transparent coat).

== Description ==
Halecania species form a crustose (firmly attached, crust-like) thallus that spreads as an inconspicuous film over the substrate. The surface can be cracked like dried mud, coarsely granular, or covered in tiny warts, and its colour ranges from chalky white through bluish-grey to brownish-grey. A true cortex—a protective skin of tightly packed cells—is either very thin or only partially developed; its outermost cells often carry a small brown cap that helps the lichen withstand intense light. Beneath this, the medulla (the inner tissue) shows no reaction to iodine (I–), and green, single-celled algae of the chlorococcoid type supply the photosynthetic partner.

Sexual reproduction occurs in sessile apothecia (stalkless disc-shaped fruit-bodies) that are initially ringed by a rim of thallus tissue (the thalline margin); this rim soon erodes, leaving a broad zone of algal cells and an indistinct cortex at the base. The exciple—the cup-like wall surrounding the hymenium—remains thin along the sides but flares slightly above, its surface again capped by brown-tipped cells. Inside, the hymenium stains blue with iodine (I+), indicating amyloid structures, while the underlying hypothecium is colourless. Slender paraphyses (sterile filaments) are mostly unbranched; their swollen, dark-brown tips form a protective canopy over the asci. Each ascus (Catillaria-type) contains eight colourless ascospores that are divided by a single cross-wall (septum) and are ellipsoidal to slipper-shaped; when treated with potassium hydroxide solution (K) the spore envelope (perispore) swells conspicuously, a feature lost in very old spores. Asexual propagules are produced in immersed pycnidia; these flask-shaped bodies release minute, rod-shaped conidia formed on pleurogenous (side-bearing) chains of cells. Chemical spot tests detect argopsin and, in some species, zeorin, and the upper surface may be pigmented dull brown (K–, non-reactive) or olive-green (K– but turning red with the organic solvent N). Although Halecania resembles Catillaria in its ascus and conidiomata structure, it is set apart by having a thalline margin on the apothecia and spores with a thick, reactive perispore; it differs from Lecania by lacking sickle-shaped conidia and by the presence of dark caps on its surface cells.

== Species ==
As of June 2025, Species Fungorum (in the Catalogue of Life) accepts 24 species of Halecania.

- Halecania ahtii Zhdanov (2020) – Russian Far East
- Halecania alpivaga (Th.Fr.) M.Mayrhofer (1987)
- Halecania athallina Fryday (2020) – Alaska
- Halecania australis Lumbsch (1994)
- Halecania bryophila Fryday & Coppins (1996)
- Halecania elaeiza (Nyl.) M.Mayrhofer (1987)
- Halecania etayoana Palice, van den Boom & Elix (2009)
- Halecania fuscopannariae Etayo & van den Boom (2009)
- Halecania giraltiae van den Boom & Etayo (2001)
- Halecania laevis M.Brand & van den Boom (2009)
- Halecania lecanorina (Anzi) M.Mayrhofer (1987)
- Halecania lobulata van den Boom & Elix (2005)
- Halecania micacea Fryday & Coppins (1996)
- Halecania pakistanica van den Boom & Elix (2005)
- Halecania panamensis van den Boom (2017) – Panama
- Halecania pannarica M.Brand & van den Boom (2009)
- Halecania parasitica Aptroot & K.H.Moon (2015)
- Halecania pepegospora (H.Magn.) van den Boom (2005)
- Halecania ralfsii (Salwey) M.Mayrhofer (1987)
- Halecania rhypodiza (Nyl.) Coppins (1989)
- Halecania robertcurtisii T.J.Curtis & Lendemer (2022) – eastern North America
- Halecania santessonii M.P.Andreev (2010) – Russia
- Halecania spodomela (Nyl.) M.Mayrhofer (1987)
- Halecania subalpivaga S.Y.Kondr., Lőkös & Hur (2015)
- Halecania subsquamosa (Müll.Arg.) van den Boom & H.Mayrhofer (2007)
- Halecania tornensis (H.Magn.) M.Mayrhofer (1987)
- Halecania viridescens Coppins & P.James (1989)
