= Maronella =

Scientific classification
- Kingdom: Fungi
- Division: Ascomycota
- Class: Lecanoromycetes
- Order: incertae sedis
- Family: incertae sedis
- Genus: Maronella; M.Steiner (1959)

Type species
- Maronella laricina M.Steiner (1959)

Species
- M. coreana M. laricina

Species of lichen

Maronella is a genus of lichens of uncertain familial and ordinal placement in the class Lecanoromycetes. The genus was circumscribed in 1959 by German lichenologist and lichen chemist Maximilian Steiner with Maronella laricina assigned as the type, and at that time, only species. This lichen is rare, having only been recorded from Austria and Spain. M. coreana, known only from type collection in South Korea, was added to the genus in 2015. Both species grow on bark and have a crust-like thallus.

== Species ==
- Maronella coreana S.Y.Kondr., Lőkös & Hur (2015) – South Korea
- Maronella laricina M.Steiner (1959) – Europe
