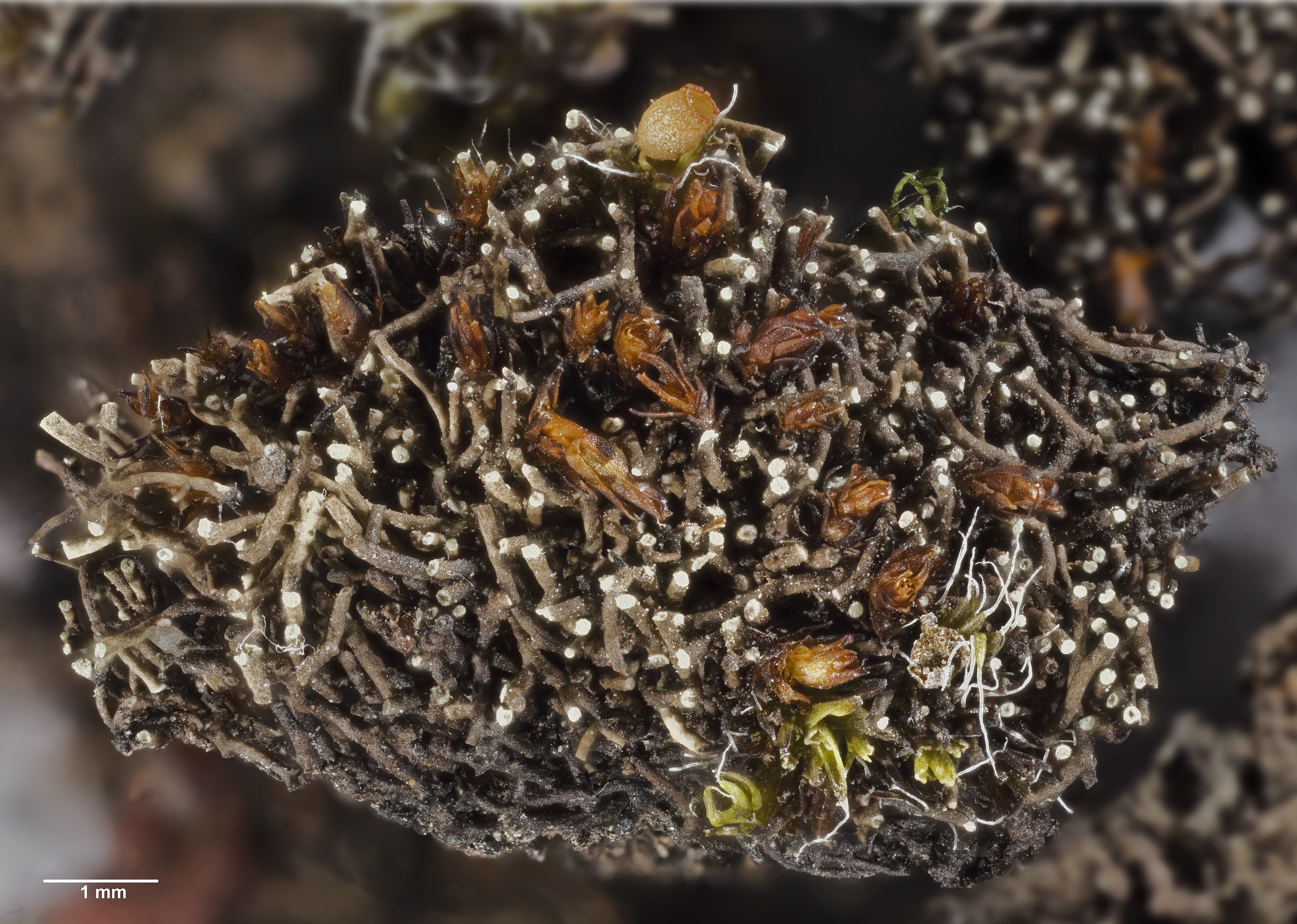

Scientific classification
- Kingdom: Fungi
- Division: Ascomycota
- Class: Lecanoromycetes
- Genus: Bartlettiella; D.J.Galloway & P.M.Jørg. (1990)
- Species: B. fragilis

Binomial name
- Bartlettiella fragilis D.J.Galloway & P.M.Jørg. (1990)
- Holotype: South Auckland, New Zealand

= Bartlettiella =

Genus of lichens

Bartlettiella is a single-species fungal genus of uncertain familial and ordinal placement in the class Lecanoromycetes. It contains the species Bartlettiella fragilis, a saxicolous (rock-dwelling), matt-forming fruticulose lichen found in New Zealand. This species was described as new to science in 1990 by the lichenologists David J. Galloway and Per Magnus Jørgensen. It is characterised by its green algal photobiont and by the production of gyrophoric acid, a lichen product. The genus name honours the botanist John Bartlett. He made many scientific collections of New Zealand lichens, including the type specimens of this species, which he found in Otupae Range in South Auckland, at an elevation of about 1,100 m (3,600 ft). Other lichens often found growing nearby Bartlettiella fragilis include Cladonia, Hypogymnia lugubris, Neuropogon subcapillaris, Stereocaulon caespitosum, S. colensoi, Usnea torulosa, and some bryophytes, including Cephaloziella, Grimmia, and Racomitrium.
