= John Bartlett (botanist) =

New Zealand botanist and plant collector

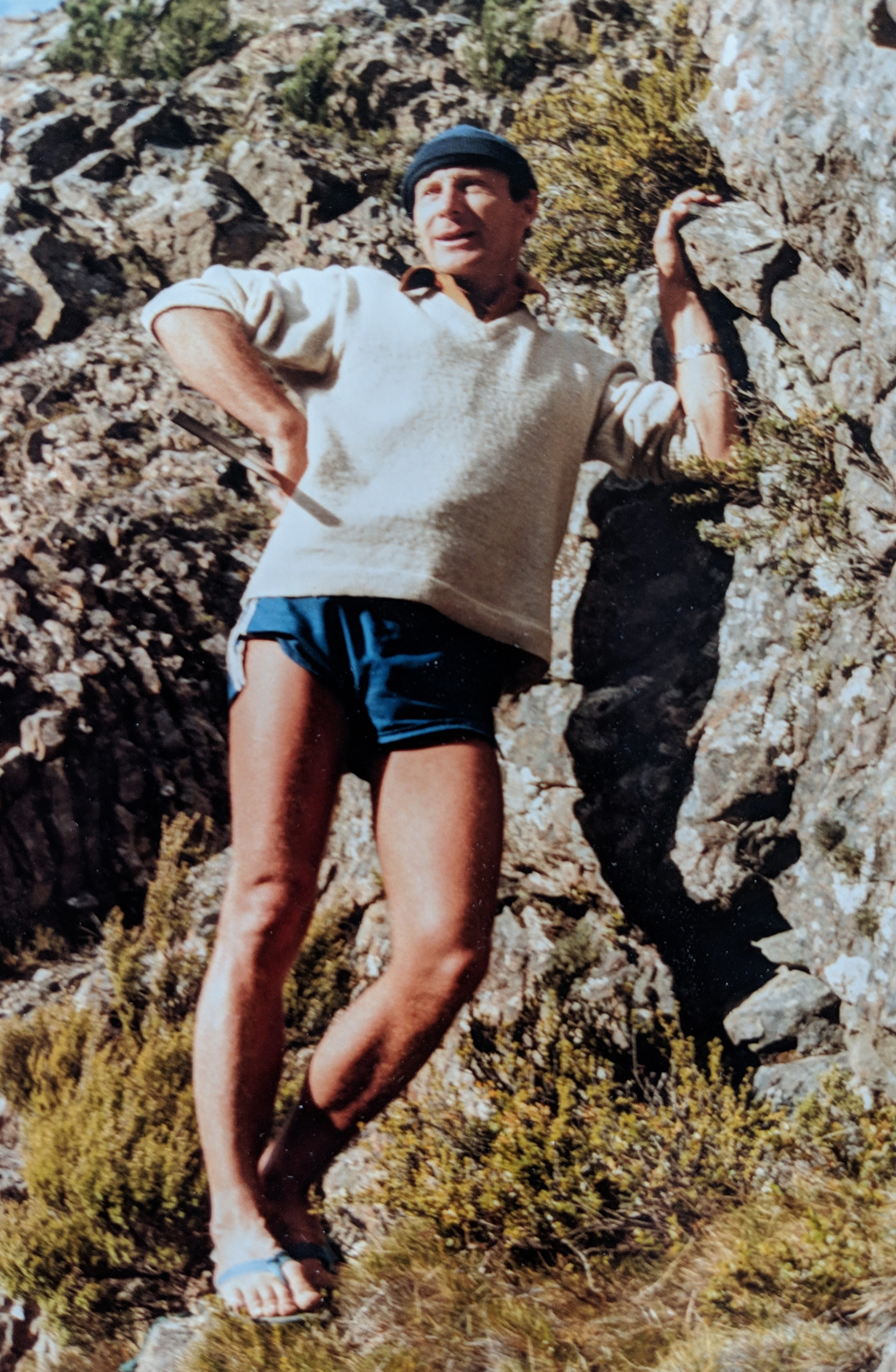
- Bartlett during a trip to North West Nelson
- Born: John Kenneth Bartlett; 7 December 1945; Hamilton, New Zealand
- Died: 1 May 1986 (aged 40); Auckland, New Zealand
- Education: M.Sc. (Mathematics), Sydney University
- Known for: Collections of New Zealand mosses, liverworts, and lichens. Found Bartlett's rātā growing near Cape Reinga.
- Scientific career
- Fields: Botany
- Author abbrev. (botany): J.K.Bartlett

John Kenneth Bartlett (7 December 1945 – 1 May 1986) was a New Zealand plant collector and botanist who specialised in mosses, liverworts, and lichens. In 1975, he found Bartlett's rātā growing south-east of Cape Reinga.

== Biography ==
Bartlett was born in Hamilton, New Zealand, on 7 December 1945, and was an only child. He attended the Marist Brothers school (now St John's College) in Hamilton, where he became dux. He studied mathematics at Auckland University, the University of Queensland in Brisbane, and finally Sydney University, where he gained his Master's degree. On his return to New Zealand, Bartlett worked as a teacher at Auckland Grammar School and at Sacred Heart College where, at his death on 1 May 1986, he was Head of Science.

== Plant collecting ==
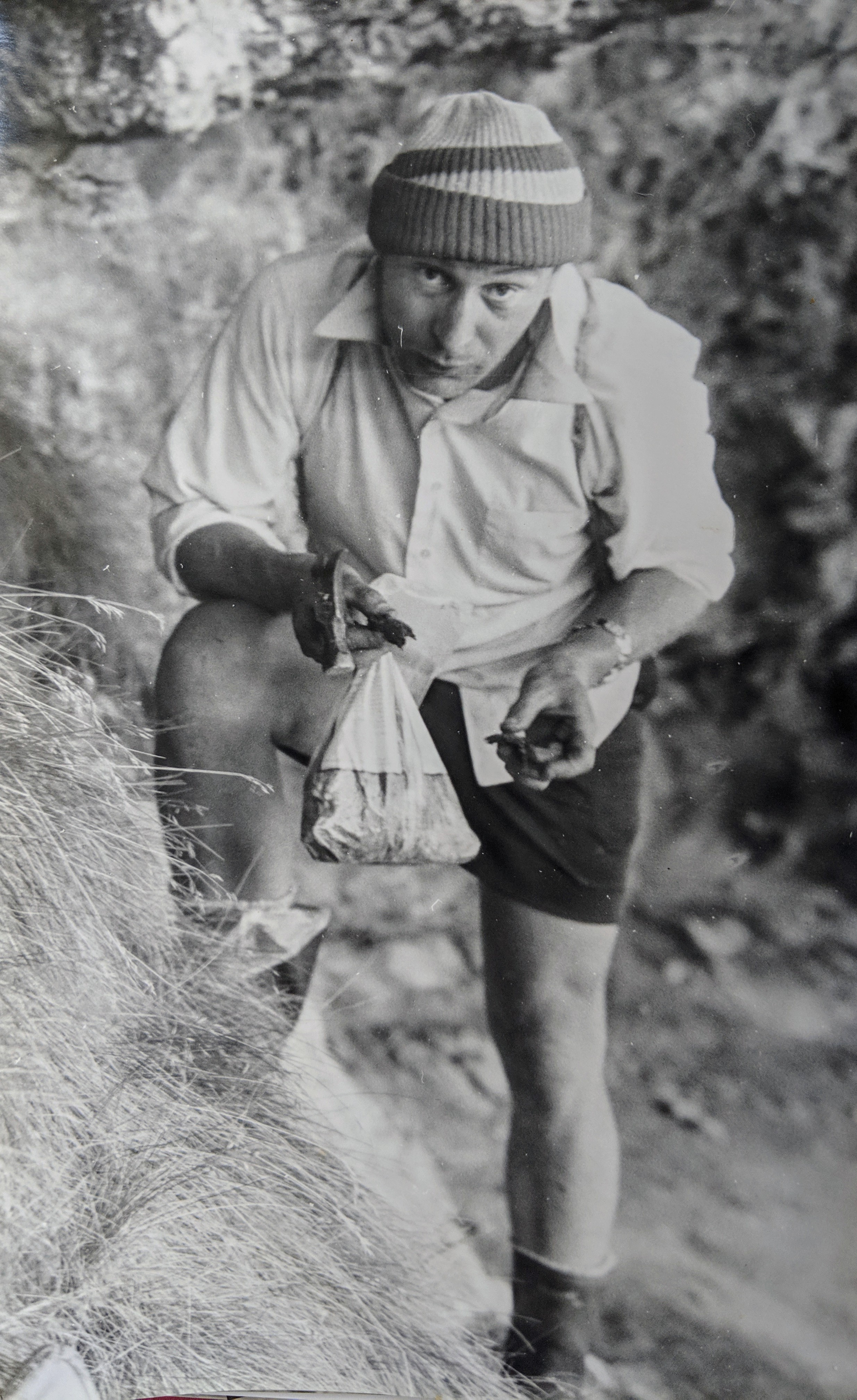
John Bartlett collecting in North West Nelson

Bartlett was an enthusiastic plant collector, who specialised in collecting New Zealand mosses, liverworts, and lichens. He was a self-taught amateur botanist, and began collecting plants when he was in his twenties. He collected specimens for professional botanists. The speed at which he collected plants, and his capacity to cover large areas of unvisited country led him being given the nickname "Hurricane Bartlett". He spoke Māori, which at times may have helped him gain access to land not normally visited by botanists.

DSIR Botanist Tony Druce describes meeting and working with Bartlett: "He arrived at our home with his old car laden with plants ... Of course he exhausted the field of higher plants in North Auckland in a few years, and moved on (down?) to lower plants. He went at such a speed that he could never give me precise localities".

From the mid-1970s Bartlett began collecting lichens. He sent specimens to specialists around the world, and David Galloway, the New Zealand lichenologist, recalled that from 1977 to 1985 Bartlett provided him "with an apparently inexhaustible supply of new and critical material for the New Zealand lichen flora".

An extract of a letter written by Bartlett to Galloway in January 1982 illustrates his indefatigable approach

"... I have returned from the incredible wilds of the West Coast of the S.I. after (1) spending a night in the bush on the coast near Bruce Bay cut off from the beach by rising tide! (2) falling into a tarn (deep!) near the Percy Pass (Manapouri) (3) nearly stranded on a limestone bluff at Castle Hill, Cave Stream 50' below! (4) Forgetting my boots and having to climb up through the bush above Wilmot Pass in my socks!..."

Bartlett's lichen and bryophyte collections are represented in New Zealand and international museum collections. Auckland Museum holds the holotype of Bartlettiella fragilis, a lichen genus he first collected in the north west Ruahine Range, and there are Bartlett specimens in the Natural History Museum, London. Bartlett added some fifty species of mosses to the New Zealand flora. In 1985, a new family of mosses, the Hypnobartlettiaceae, was named in his honour (based on specimens he collected in North West Nelson). In addition to collecting specimens, Bartlett published around 24 scientific publications.

== Bartlett's rātā ==
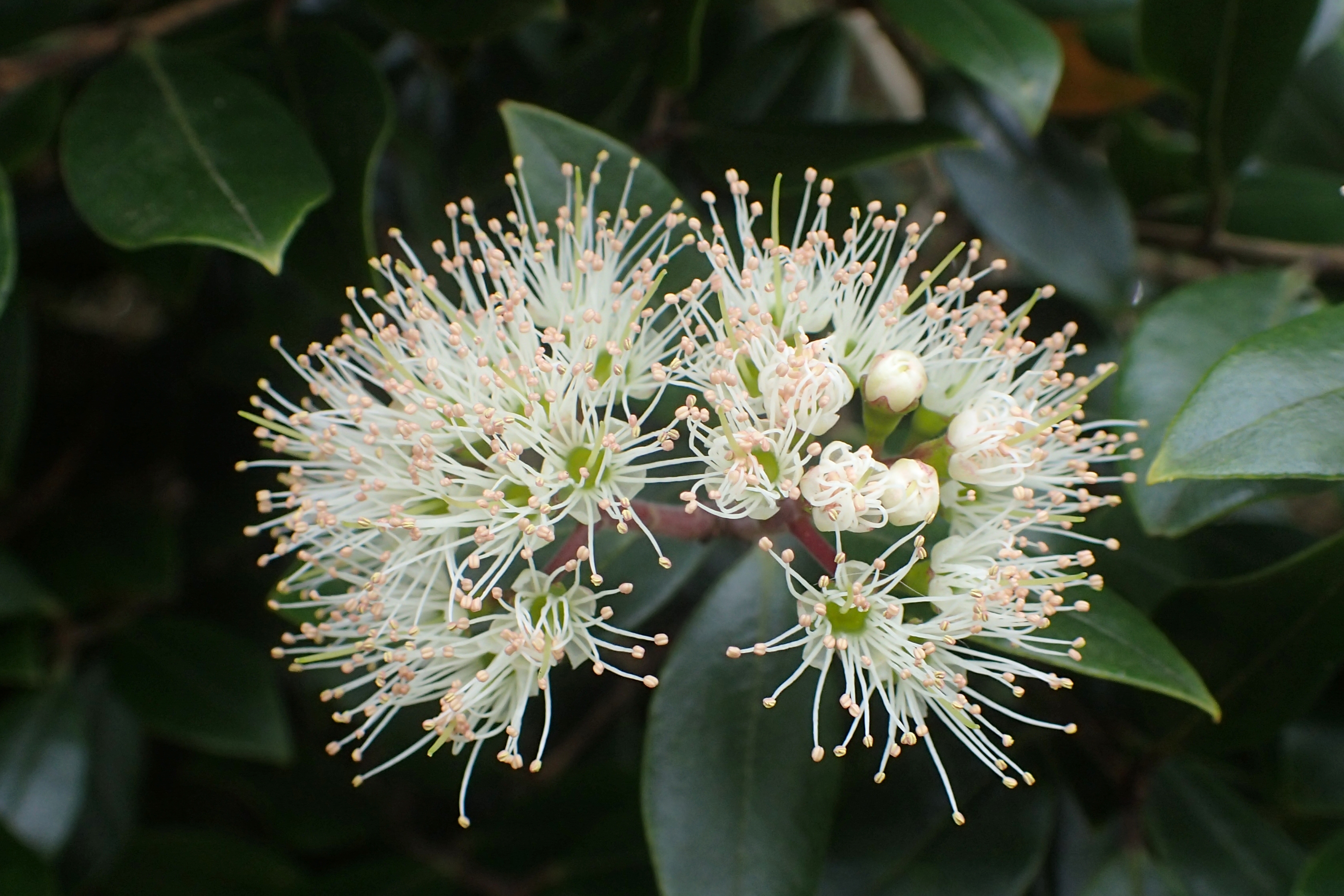
Metrosideros bartlettii in Auckland Botanic Gardens

While searching for liverworts in 1975, Bartlett came across an unusual species of rātā growing at Radar Bush, 9.5 km south-east of Cape Reinga. His attention was drawn to the tree's distinctive bark, which is spongy, whitish and flakes easily, but he was unable to reach any branches. He took bark fragments to Victoria University botanist John Dawson, who was unconvinced that the tree was unusual. Bartlett returned to the area with a rifle, with which he was able to shoot off a branch. It was ten years before its white flowers were seen by scientists in 1984, appearing 'like snow over the tree crowns' and allowing the new species to be formally described and named Metrosideros bartlettii, known as Bartlett's rātā, or rātā moehau in Māori. Bartlett's rātā is now grown as a garden plant, but only 13 adult Bartlett's rātā are known to still exist in the wild.

== Eponymy ==
As well as Metrosideros bartlettii, numerous other taxa were named after Bartlett, including:

- Hypnobartlettia fontana Ochyra 1985
- Bryobartlettia costata Buck 1981
- Bryobeckettia bartlettii
- Colura pulcherrima var. bartlettii
- Enterographa bartlettii
- Megalospora bartlettii
- Pseudocyphellaria bartlettii
- Diploschistes muscorum ssp. bartlettii
- Stenocybe bartlettii
