= Bouvetiella =

Scientific classification
- Domain: Eukaryota
- Kingdom: Fungi
- Division: Ascomycota
- Class: Lecanoromycetes
- Order: incertae sedis
- Family: incertae sedis
- Genus: Bouvetiella; Øvstedal (1986)
- Species: B. pallida

Binomial name
- Bouvetiella pallida Øvstedal (1986)

Genus of lichen

Bouvetiella is a monotypic genus of lichenized fungus in the class Lecanoromycetes. It contains only the species Bouvetiella pallida.

== Taxonomy ==
Bouvetiella pallida was first described by Dag Olav Øvstedal, a Norwegian lichenologist, in 1986. At that time, no molecular sequencing had been done on genetic material from the species. As of May 2023, that was still the case, so the genus Bouvetiella has not been assigned to a family or order, though it is known to fall into the class Lecanoromycetes. Bouvetiella pallida is distinctly different from any other known lichen. Because of this, Øvstedal established the genus Bouvetiella to contain it. Bouvetiella pallida is the only species in the genus.

== Description ==
Bouvetiella pallida is a brownish-black crustose lichen which grows up to 1 cm (0.39 in) in diameter. Its thallus, the lichen's vegetative body, is rubbery (gelatinose) with small, granular scales known as squamules. Its tiny, pale apothecia, the lichen's fruiting bodies, measure a mere 0.2 mm (0.0079 in) in diameter and can range in colour from light pink to whitish. These can be flat, or slightly convex. The asci each contain eight lemon-shaped ascospores. Thin-walled, transparent and colourless, these ascospores measure 14–16 x 5–6 μm and contain numerous oil droplets.

== Habitat and range ==
Bouvetiella pallida was initially known only from Bouvet Island – a volcanic, subantarctic island in the southern Atlantic Ocean. There, it occurs 15–25 m (49–82 ft) above sea level, typically growing on low-growing communities of mosses. Those it most often overgrows belong to the genera Bryum and Tortula. It has also been found on soil (silt or scoria) near a fumerole. On Bouvet Island, it has been found only in the area known as Nyrøysa – a flat terrace created by a rock slide on the island's northwestern coast in the 1950s. However, in 1998, it was also discovered on Livingston Island in the South Shetlands, on the lower slopes of Mount Reina Sofía. There, it was growing on soil over rock.
