= Lecania leprosa =

Scientific classification
- Domain: Eukaryota
- Kingdom: Fungi
- Division: Ascomycota
- Class: Lecanoromycetes
- Order: Lecanorales
- Family: Ramalinaceae
- Genus: Lecania
- Species: L. leprosa

Binomial name
- Lecania leprosa Reese Næsb. & Vondrák (2008)

Species of lichen

Lecania leprosa is a species of saxicolous (rock-dwelling), crustose lichen in the family Ramalinaceae. It occurs in Eastern Europe.

== Taxonomy ==
The lichen was formally described as a new species in 2008 by Rikke Reese Næsborg and Jan Vondrák. The type specimen was collected from Devín (Carpathian Mountains, Slovakia), where it was found growing on the mortar of a northwest-exposed wall. The species epithet leprosa means "scurfy" or "scaley", and refers to the form of the lichen thallus.

== Description ==
Lecania leprosa has an irregularly areolate, relatively thick crust-like thallus with a colour ranging from pale grey, grey, lead-grey, blue-grey, brown-grey, to dark grey (sometimes with a greenish tint). The species is usually encountered in the sterile form (i.e., without any apothecia), but in the few instances that apothecia have been recorded, they are typically 0.31–0.47 mm in diameter with a brown to dark brown disc and a margin that is the same colour as the thallus. Ascospores are hyaline and ellipsoid with a single septum, and dimensions of 9.9–11.3 μm long by 3.5–4.0 μm wide. The lichen thallus contains an acetone-insoluble pigment called Hertelii-green.

== Habitat and distribution ==
Lecania leprosa has been recorded from Austria, Czech Republic, Romania, and Slovakia, where it grows on concrete, mortar, and limestone.
