= Buelliastrum =

Scientific classification
- Kingdom: Fungi
- Division: Ascomycota
- Class: Lecanoromycetes
- Genus: Buelliastrum; Zahlbr. (1930)

Species
- B. crassum B. tenue

Genus of lichens

Buelliastrum is a fungal genus of uncertain familial and ordinal placement in the class Lecanoromycetes. The genus was circumscribed by the lichenologist Alexander Zahlbruckner in 1930 to contain two little-known species found in China. He did not indicate a type species for the genus. In his work Lichenes. Übersicht über sämtliche bisher aus China bekannten Flechten ('Lichens. An overview on all hitherto known lichens from China'), Zahlbruckner described more than 280 new taxa, mostly collected from the greater Tibetan region of North Yunnan and South west Sichuan.
