= Robincola =

Scientific classification
- Kingdom: Fungi
- Division: Ascomycota
- Class: Leotiomycetes
- Order: Helotiales
- Family: incertae sedis
- Genus: Robincola; Velen.

Type species
- Robincola gregaria Velen.

Genus of fungi

Robincola is a genus of fungi in the Helotiales order. The full scientific name is Robincola Velen. Robincola was originally discovered and classified in 1947 by Joseph Velenovsky. The relationship of this taxon to other taxa within the order is unknown (incertae sedis). This is a monotypic genus, containing the single species Robincola gregaria.
