= Argopsis =

Scientific classification
- Domain: Eukaryota
- Kingdom: Fungi
- Division: Ascomycota
- Class: Lecanoromycetes
- Order: incertae sedis
- Family: incertae sedis
- Genus: Argopsis; Th. Fr.

Type species
- Argopsis megalospora Th. Fr.

Genus of fungi

Argopsis is a genus of lichenized fungi in the class Lecanoromycetes. As of October 2022, it has not been assigned to a family or order.
