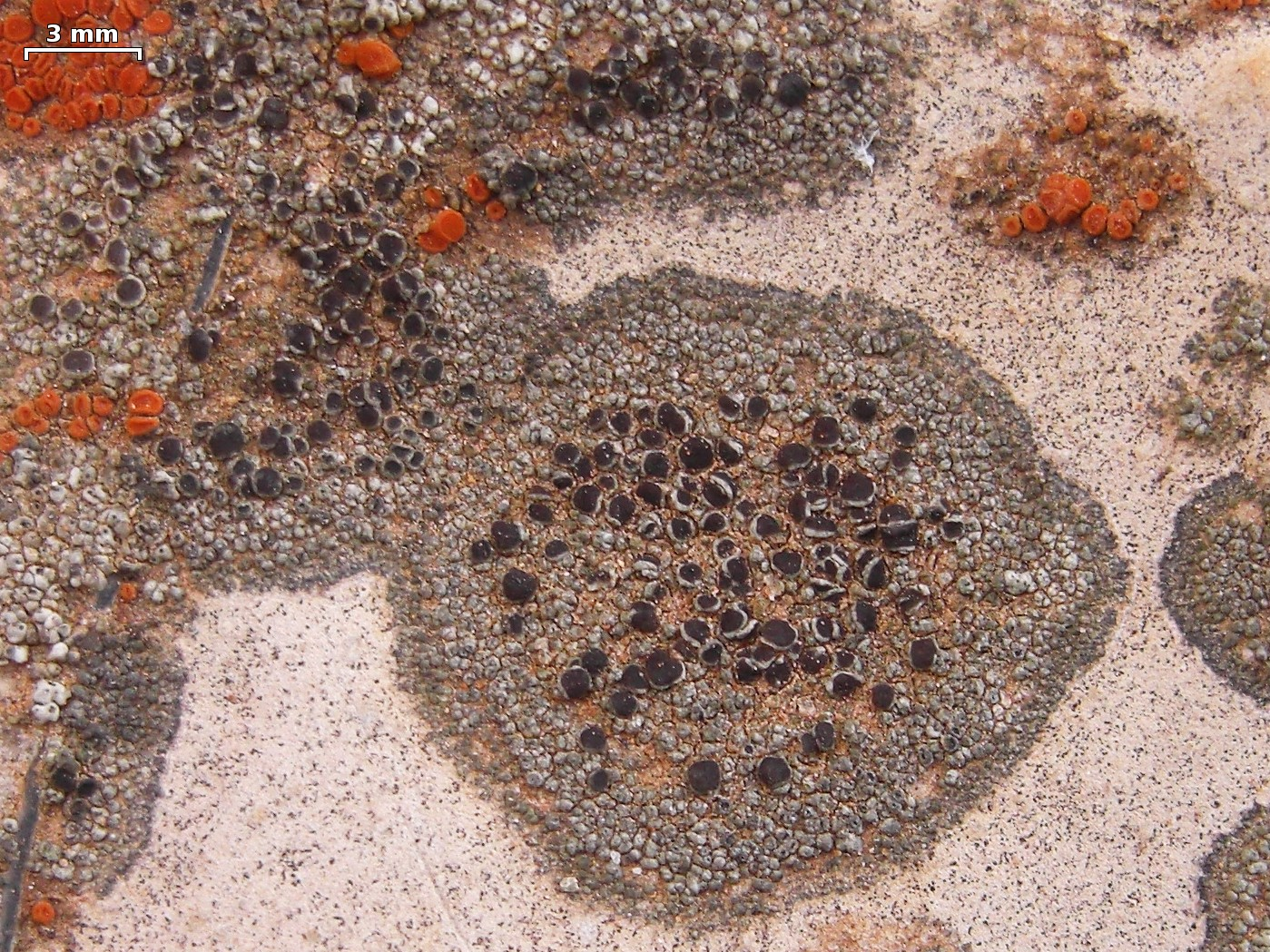
- Lecania fructigena

Scientific classification
- Domain: Eukaryota
- Kingdom: Fungi
- Division: Ascomycota
- Class: Lecanoromycetes
- Order: Lecanorales
- Family: Ramalinaceae
- Genus: Lecania; A.Massal. (1853)

Type species
- Lecania fuscella (Schaer.) A.Massal. (1853)

Synonyms
- Bayrhofferia Trevis. (1857); Dimerospora Th.Fr. (1860); Lecaniella Jatta (1889); Dyslecanis Clem. (1909); Adermatis Clem. (1909); Lecaniomyces E.A.Thomas (1939); Oxnerella S.Y.Kondr., Lőkös & Hur (2014)

= Lecania =

Genus of fungi

Lecania is a genus of lichen-forming fungi in the family Ramalinaceae. Lecania is widely distributed, especially in temperate regions, and contains about 65 species. These lichens form thin, crusty growths on various surfaces and produce small disc-shaped fruiting bodies that are typically brown to black in colour. Most species reproduce both sexually through spores and asexually through tiny reproductive structures, allowing them to spread effectively in their environments.

== Taxonomy ==
The genus was circumscribed by Abramo Bartolommeo Massalongo in 1853. He assigned Lecania fuscella as the type species.

== Description ==
Lecania forms a crustose thallus—that is, a thin, paint-like growth tightly attached to the substrate. Depending on the species, this crust may be only a fraction of a millimetre thick or develop into a more robust layer that cracks into tiny plates (areoles) or wart-like bumps. In a few taxa the surface becomes minutely lobed or covered with powdery reproductive tissues such as soralia or tiny grain-like propagules (blastidia, goniocysts) that help the lichen spread vegetatively. Colours range from grey-white and pale yellow to deep brown-black; many specimens acquire a frost-like coating of minute crystals called pruina, and some have a dead, transparent epinecral film that gives a slightly glazed look. The upper cortex is built of tightly packed fungal cells, though in some species this layer is so saturated with crystals that its cellular structure is obscured. The photosynthetic partner is always a single-celled green alga of the chlorococcoid type, which nestles within the medulla just beneath the cortex.

The sexual fruiting bodies are tiny, stalk-less discs (apothecia) that appear flat when young but often bulge into low domes with age. Measuring roughly 0.4–0.6 mm across (occasionally up to 1 mm), these discs vary in colour from pale brown through orange to almost black and may also carry a dusting of pruina. They are usually rimmed by a thin band of thallus tissue, though this margin can erode in older specimens. Viewed in section, the hymenium (the fertile layer) is colourless but turns blue when stained with iodine. Slender paraphyses thread through the hymenium; their tips often swell or darken, giving a mottled, "piebald" appearance when the disc is wetted. Each ascus ordinarily houses eight colourless ascospores (occasionally up to sixteen) that are one- to three-septate, though some species may have spores with as many as seven internal walls. Spores are thin-walled, sausage- to spindle-shaped, and longer examples can curve gently. Asexual reproduction is common on bark-dwelling species: flask-shaped pycnidia produce tiny, curved conidia.

Most Lecania species lack distinctive secondary metabolites, but a few contain the lichen substance atranorin or various unidentified terpenes. Pigments within the apothecia sometimes give positive colour reactions with standard chemical spot tests (K or N).

== Species ==
As of June 2025, Species Fungorum (in the Catalogue of Life) accepts 65 species of Lecania.

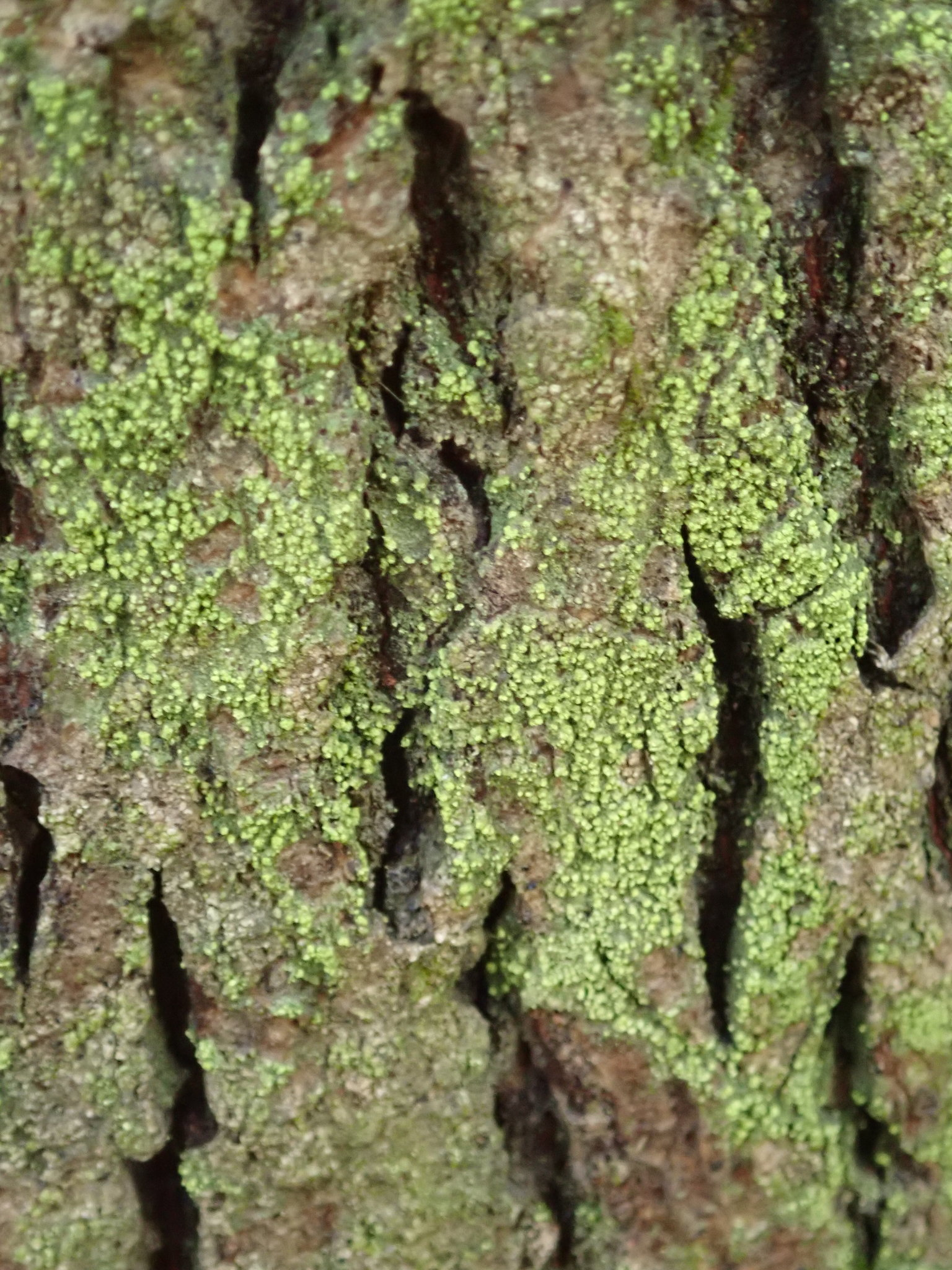
Lecania croatica

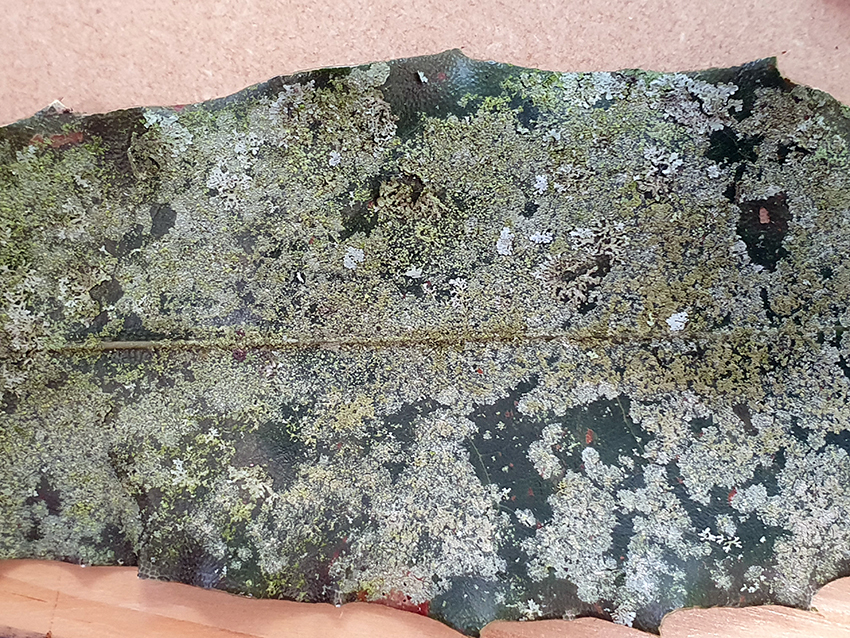
Lecania erysibe

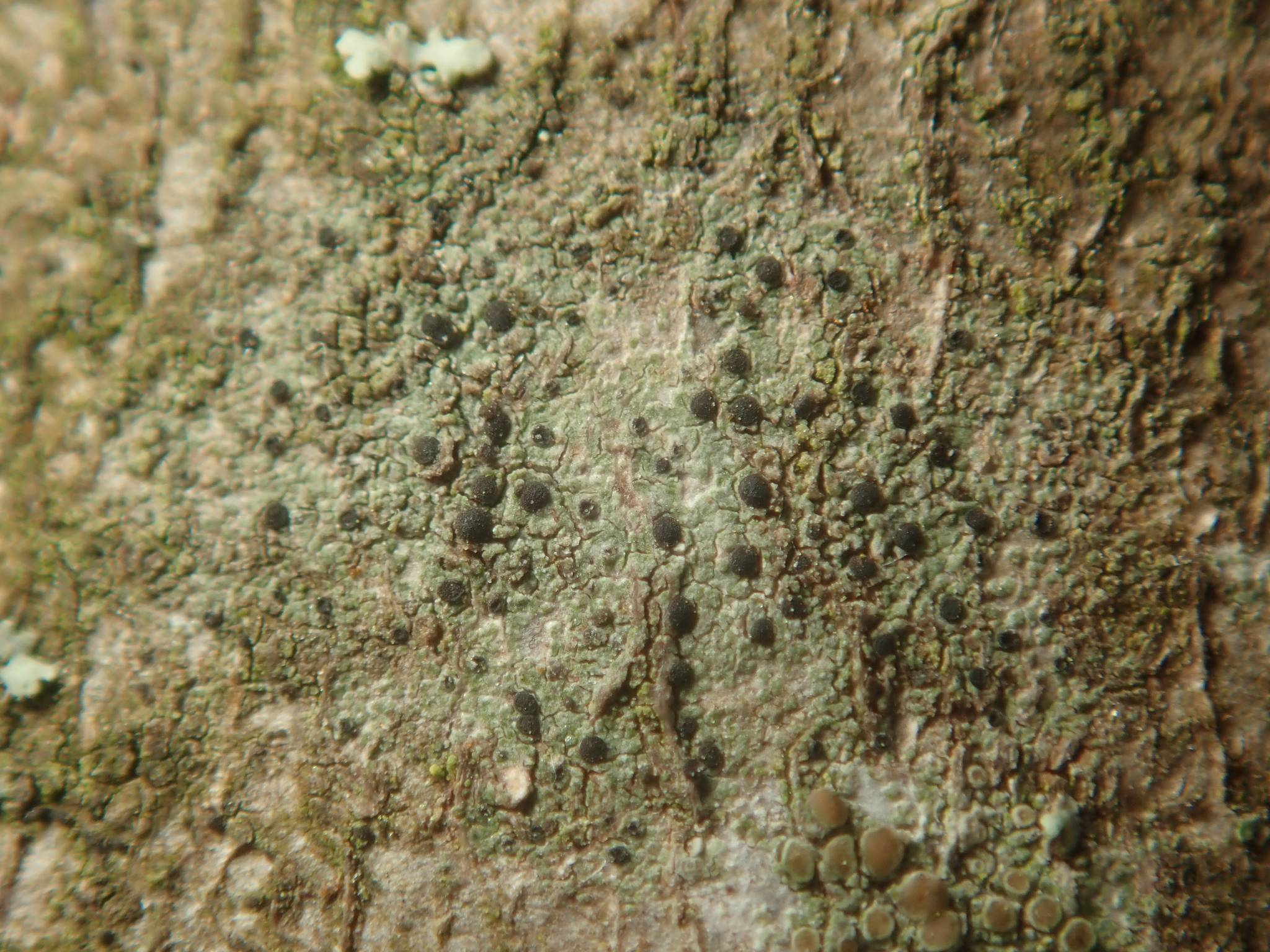
Lecania naegelii

- Lecania arizonica B.D.Ryan & van den Boom (2004)
- Lecania atrynioides M.Knowles (1913)
- Lecania azorica van den Boom (2016)
- Lecania baeomma (Nyl.) P.James & J.R.Laundon (1980)
- Lecania belgica van den Boom & Reese Næsb. (2007)
- Lecania brattiae B.D.Ryan & van den Boom (2004)
- Lecania caloplacicola B.D.Ryan & van den Boom (2004)
- Lecania chalcophila B.D.Ryan & van den Boom (2004)
- Lecania chirisanensis S.Y.Kondr., Lőkös & Hur (2015)
- Lecania chlaronoides Müll.Arg. (1895)
- Lecania circumpallescens (Nyl.) Kotlov (2004)
- Lecania coeruleorubella (Mudd) M.Mayrhofer (1988)
- Lecania coerulescens Mudd (1861)
- Lecania coreana S.Y.Kondr., Lőkös & Hur (2013)
- Lecania croatica (Zahlbr.) Kotlov (2004)
- Lecania cuprea (A.Massal.) van den Boom & Coppins (1992)
- Lecania cyrtella (Ach.) Th.Fr. (1871)
- Lecania cyrtellina (Nyl.) Zahlbr. (1871)
- Lecania dubitans (Nyl.) A.L.Sm. (1918)
- Lecania erysibe (Ach.) Mudd (1861)
- Lecania euphorbiae van den Boom & Etayo (2017)
- Lecania fabacea (Müll.Arg.) Müll.Arg. (1895)
- Lecania franciscana (Tuck.) K.Knudsen & Lendemer (2007)
- Lecania fructigena Zahlbr. (1914)
- Lecania fuscella (Schaer.) A.Massal. (1853)
- Lecania fuscelloides B.D.Ryan & van den Boom (2004)
- Lecania glauca Øvstedal & Søchting (2004)
- Lecania graminum (Vain.) J.Gerasimova & S.Ekma (2017)
- Lecania granulata Coppins & Fryday (2012)
- Lecania heardensis C.W.Dodge (1948)
- Lecania hutchinsiae (Nyl.) A.L.Sm. (1918)
- Lecania hydrophobica T.Sprib. & Fryday (2020)
- Lecania inundata (Hepp ex Körb.) M.Mayrhofer (1987)
- Lecania johnstonii C.W.Dodge (1948)
- Lecania juniperi van den Boom (2012)
- Lecania leprosa Reese Næsb. & Vondrák (2008)
- Lecania madida Reese Næsb. & Björk (2008)
- Lecania makarevicziae Moniri, S.Y.Kondr. & van den Boom (2016)
- Lecania maritima Kantvilas & van den Boom (2015)
- Lecania molliuscula Müll.Arg. (1895)
- Lecania muelleriana Zahlbr. (1928)
- Lecania naegelii (Hepp) Diederich & van den Boom (1994)
- Lecania nigra van den Boom & Ertz (2012)
- Lecania nylanderiana A.Massal. (1856)
- Lecania olivacella (Nyl.) Zahlbr. (1928)
- Lecania pacifica Zahlbr. ex B.D.Ryan & van den Boom (2004)
- Lecania poeltii van den Boom, Alonso & Egea (1996)
- Lecania polycarpa (Müll.Arg.) Kantvilas & van den Boom (2015)
- Lecania polycycla (Anzi) Lettau (1912)
- Lecania rabenhorstii (Hepp) Arnold (1884)
- Lecania rinodinoides S.Y.Kondr., Lőkös & Hur (2013)
- Lecania ryaniana van den Boom (2004)
- Lecania sanguinolenta (Stirt.) Zahlbr. (1928)
- Lecania sessilisoraliata Yazıcı & Aptroot (2017)
- Lecania sipmanii van den Boom & Zedda (2000)
- Lecania sordida Reese Næsb. (2008)
- Lecania spadicea (Flot.) Zahlbr. (1915)
- Lecania suavis (Müll.Arg.) Mig. (1926)
- Lecania subfuscula (Nyl.) S.Ekman (1996)
- Lecania sylvestris (Arnold) Arnold (1884)
- Lecania triseptatoides van den Boom & Moniri (2018)
- Lecania turicensis (Hepp) Müll.Arg. (1862)
- Lecania vermispora Fryday (2019) – Falkland Islands
