= Hoemunsan =

Mountain in South Korea

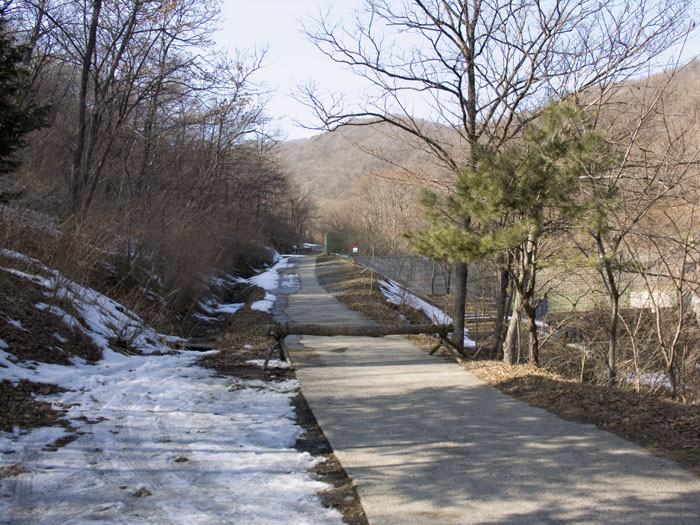
- Hoemunsan in winter 2008

Highest point
- Elevation: 837 m (2,746 ft)
- Coordinates: 35°30′00″N 127°06′22″E

Geography
- Location: North Jeolla Province, South Korea

Korean name
- Hangul: 회문산
- Hanja: 回文山
- RR: Hoemunsan
- MR: Hoemunsan

Hoemunsan (Korean: 회문산) is a mountain located in North Jeolla Province, South Korea. It has an elevation of 837 m (2,746 ft).

== See also ==
- Geography of South Korea
- List of mountains in Korea
- List of mountains by elevation
