= Vittore Benedetto Antonio Trevisan de Saint-Léon =

Italian botanist

Vittore Benedetto Antonio Trevisan de Saint-Léon (5 June 1818, in Padua – 8 April 1897, in Milan) was an Italian botanist who specialized in cryptogamic flora. He edited the exsiccata Lichenotheca Veneta.

During his career, he was a professor of natural history in Padua. In 1882, he was named president of the Accademia fisio-medica-statistica in Milan.

In 1848, he circumscribed the genus Romanoa (family Euphorbiaceae) and in 1861, named the genus Speerschneidera (family Bacidiaceae). In 1888, he circumscribed the (Algae) genus Nocardia (family Nocardiaceae) that is now classed as bacteria. Also, he is also the taxonomic authority of the fern genera Blechnopteris (synonym of Blechnum L.), Neurosorus (synonym of Coniogramme Fée,)and Oligocampia (synonym of Athyrium Roth).

== Selected works ==
- Prospetto della flora euganea, 1842.
- Le alghe del tenere udinese, 1844.
- Nomenclator algarum, ou Collection des noms imposés aux plantes de la famille des algues, 1845.
- Saggio di una monografia delle alghe coccotalle, 1848.
- Caratteri di dodici nuovi generi di licheni, 1853.
- Schema di una nuova classificazione delle epatiche, 1877.
- L'opera lichenologica di Vittore Trevisan (1994).

== See also ==
- Category:Taxa named by Vittore Benedetto Antonio Trevisan de Saint-Léon
