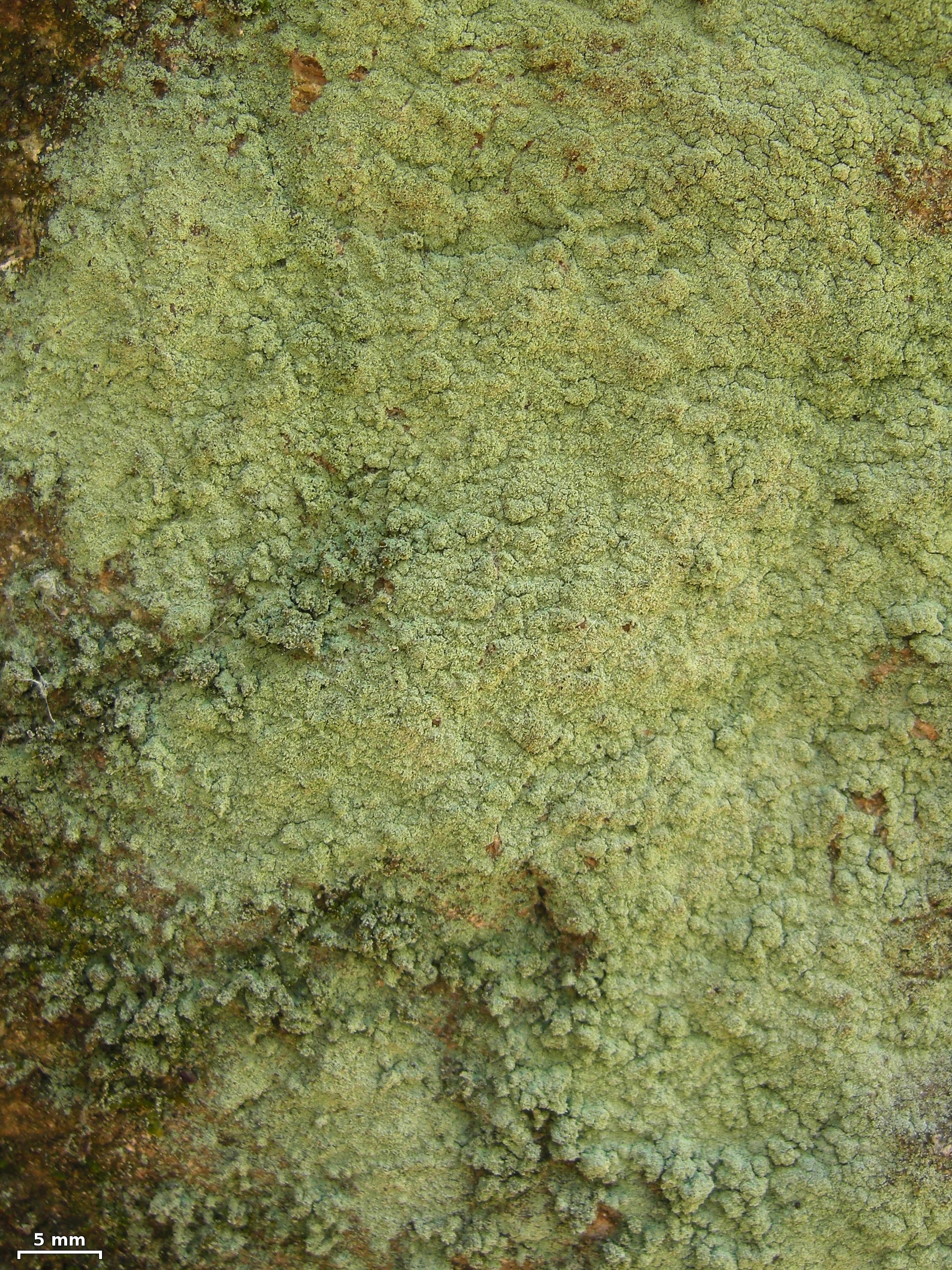
- Leprocaulon knudsenii, San Gabriel Mountains, southern California

Scientific classification
- Kingdom: Fungi
- Division: Ascomycota
- Class: Lecanoromycetes
- Order: Leprocaulales; Lendemer & B.P.Hodk. (2013)
- Family: Leprocaulaceae; Lendemer & B.P.Hodk. (2013)

Type genus
- Leprocaulon Nyl. (1879)

Genera
- Halecania; Leprocaulon; Speerschneidera

= Leprocaulaceae =

Family of lichen-forming fungi

Leprocaulaceae is a family of mostly lichen-forming fungi. It is the single family in the monotypic order Leprocaulales. Leprocaulaceae contains three genera and about 33 species.

== Taxonomy ==
Both the family and the order were circumscribed by American lichenologists James Lendemer and Brendan Hodkinson in 2013. They studied sterile, crustose lichens previously classified in the genus Lepraria using molecular phylogenetic techniques. They redefined the genus Leprocaulon to include several crustose lichens that were previously placed in Lepraria, and defined the new family and order to contain this genetically distinct grouping of species, including the genus Halecania. Speerschneidera was included based on the results of a study published a year later. The authors suggested that Leprocaulales is sister to the Caliciales, although in a later phylogenetic study using a temporal approach, it appeared to be more closely related to the Teloschistales.

== Description ==
Collectively, Leprocaulaceae is a morphologically diverse family. Most taxa in the family are sterile lichens that reproduce asexually, and produce the secondary compounds argopsin, pannarin, and usnic acid. Those taxa that are fertile have lecanorine apothecia and hyaline ascospores. Genus Halecania contains one lichenicolous fungus, and five lichenicolous lichens.

== Genera ==
- Halecania M.Mayrhofer (1987) – 22 spp.
- Leprocaulon Nyl. (1879) – ca. 10 spp.
- Speerschneidera Trevis. (1861) – 1 sp.
