= Lecanoromycetes =

- Clockwise from top left: Acarospora socialis (yellow cobblestone lichen); Umbilicaria mammulata (smooth rock tripe); Icmadophila ericetorum (candy lichen); Ochrolechia parella (crawfish lichen); Physcia pumilior (lesser gray legs); Xanthomendoza hasseana (poplar sunburst lichen); Usnea cavernosa (pitted beard lichen); and Peltigera malacea (veinless pelt lichen)

Scientific classification
- Kingdom: Fungi
- Division: Ascomycota
- Clade: Leotiomyceta
- (unranked): Dothideomyceta
- Class: Lecanoromycetes; O.E.Erikss. & Winka (1997)

Subclasses and orders
- Subclass Acarosporomycetidae: Acarosporales; Subclass Lecanoromycetidae: Caliciales; Lecanorales; Lecideales; Leprocaulales; Peltigerales; Rhizocarpales; Sporastatiales; Teloschistales; Subclass Ostropomycetidae: Agyriales; Baeomycetales; Graphidales; Gyalectales; Odontotrematales; Ostropales; Pertusariales; Sarrameanales; Schaereriales; Thelenellales; incertae sedis (not placed in a subclass): Candelariales; Micropeltidales; Turquoiseomycetales; Umbilicariales

Class of lichenized fungi

Lecanoromycetes is the largest class of lichenized fungi. It belongs to the subphylum Pezizomycotina in the phylum Ascomycota. The asci (spore-bearing cells) of the Lecanoromycetes most often release spores by rostrate dehiscence.

The group is monophyletic (composed only of all the descendants of a common ancestor).

== Genera of uncertain placement ==
There are several genera in the Lecanoromycetes that have not been placed into any order or family. These are:

- Argopsis Th.Fr. (1857) – 1 sp.
- Ascographa Velen. (1934) – 1 sp.
- Bartlettiella D.J.Galloway & P.M.Jørg. (1990) – 1 sp.
- Bouvetiella Øvstedal (1986) – 1 sp.
- Buelliastrum Zahlbr. (1930) – 2 spp.
- Haploloma Trevis. (1857) – 1 sp.
- Hosseusia Gyeln. (1940) – 1 sp.
- Korfiomyces Iturr. & D.Hawksw. (2004) – 1 sp.
- Maronella M.Steiner (1959) – 1 sp.
- Petractis Fr. (1845) – 3 spp.
- Piccolia A.Massal. (1956) – 10 spp.
- Ravenelula Speg. (1881) – 2 spp.
- Robincola Velen. (1947) – 1 sp.
- Roburnia Velen. (1947) – 1 sp.
