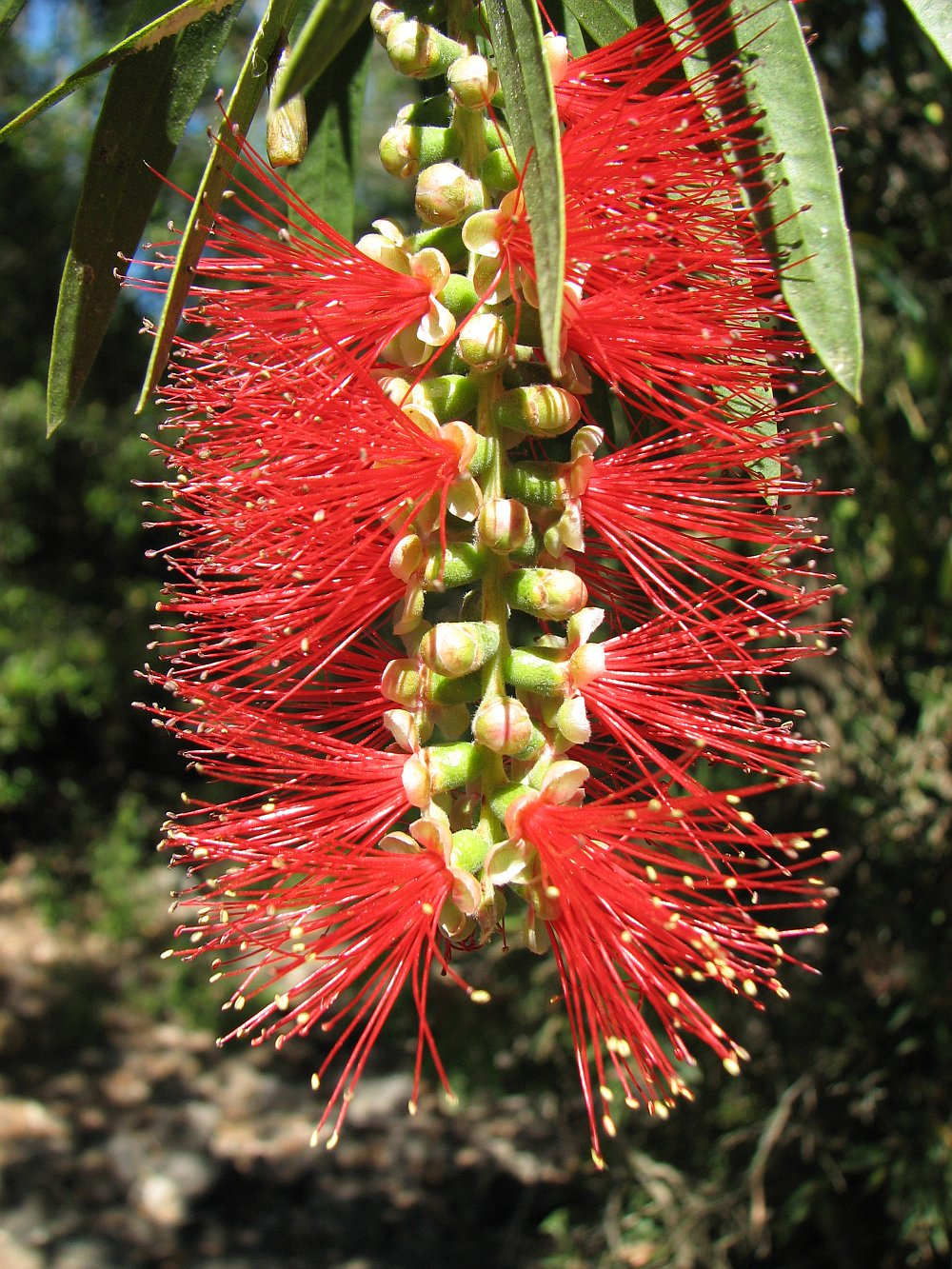
- Red bottlebrush flower

Scientific classification
- Kingdom: Plantae
- Clade: Tracheophytes
- Clade: Angiosperms
- Clade: Eudicots
- Clade: Rosids
- Order: Myrtales
- Family: Myrtaceae
- Subfamily: Myrtoideae
- Tribe: Melaleuceae
- Genus: Callistemon; R.Br.

= Callistemon =

Genus of flowering plants

Callistemon /ˌkælɪˈstiːmən/ is a genus of shrubs in the family Myrtaceae, first described as a genus in 1814. The entire genus is endemic to Australia but widely cultivated in many other regions and naturalised in scattered locations. Their status as a separate taxon is in doubt, some authorities accepting that the difference between callistemons and melaleucas is not sufficient for them to be grouped in a separate genus.

== Description ==
Callistemon species have commonly been referred to as bottlebrushes because of their cylindrical, brush like flowers resembling a traditional bottle brush. They are mostly found in the more temperate regions of Australia, especially along the east coast and typically favour moist conditions so when planted in gardens thrive on regular watering. However, two species are found in Tasmania and several others in the south-west of Western Australia. At least some species are drought-resistant and some are used in ornamental landscaping elsewhere in the world.

== Cultivation ==
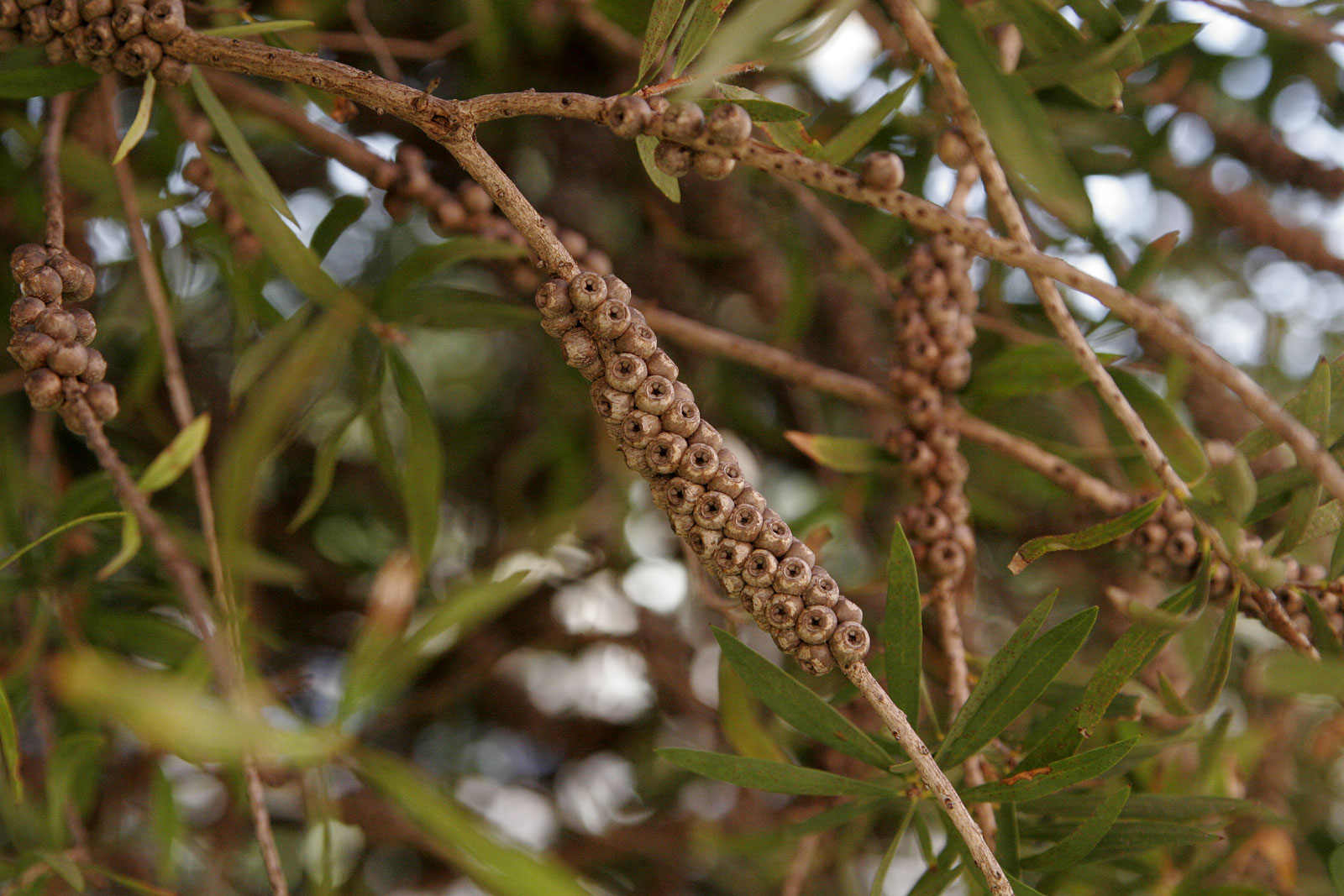
Bottlebrush seed capsules

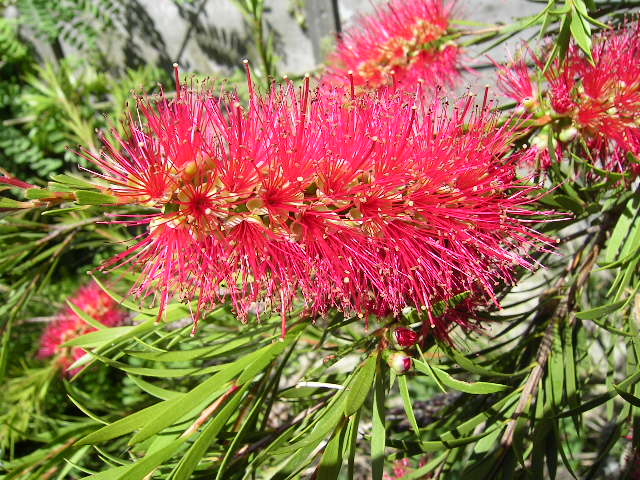
Callistemon citrinus

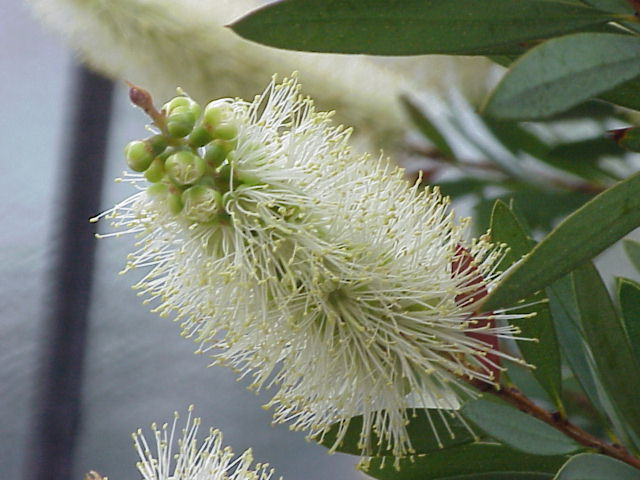
Callistemon pallidus

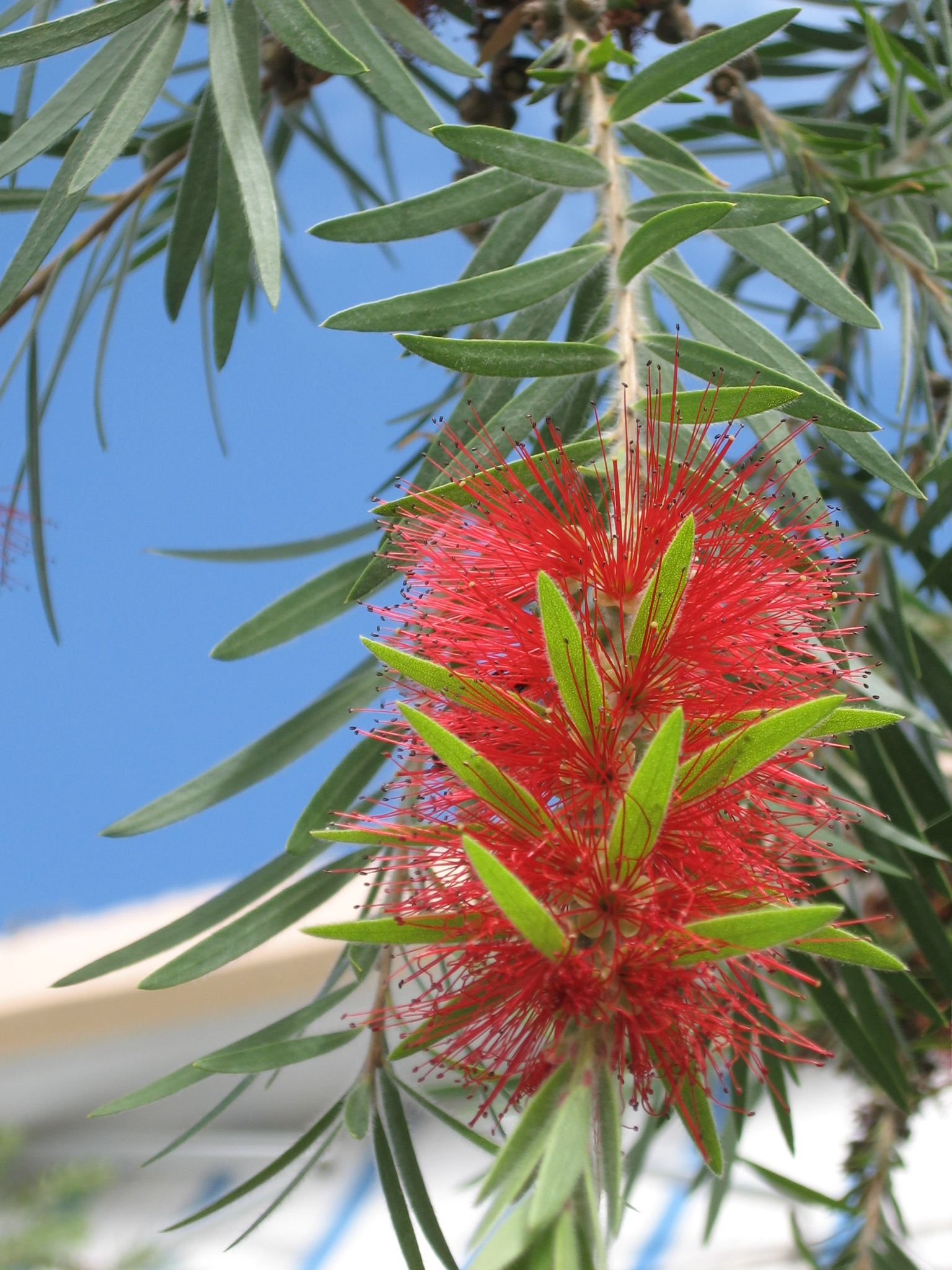
Callistemon viminalis

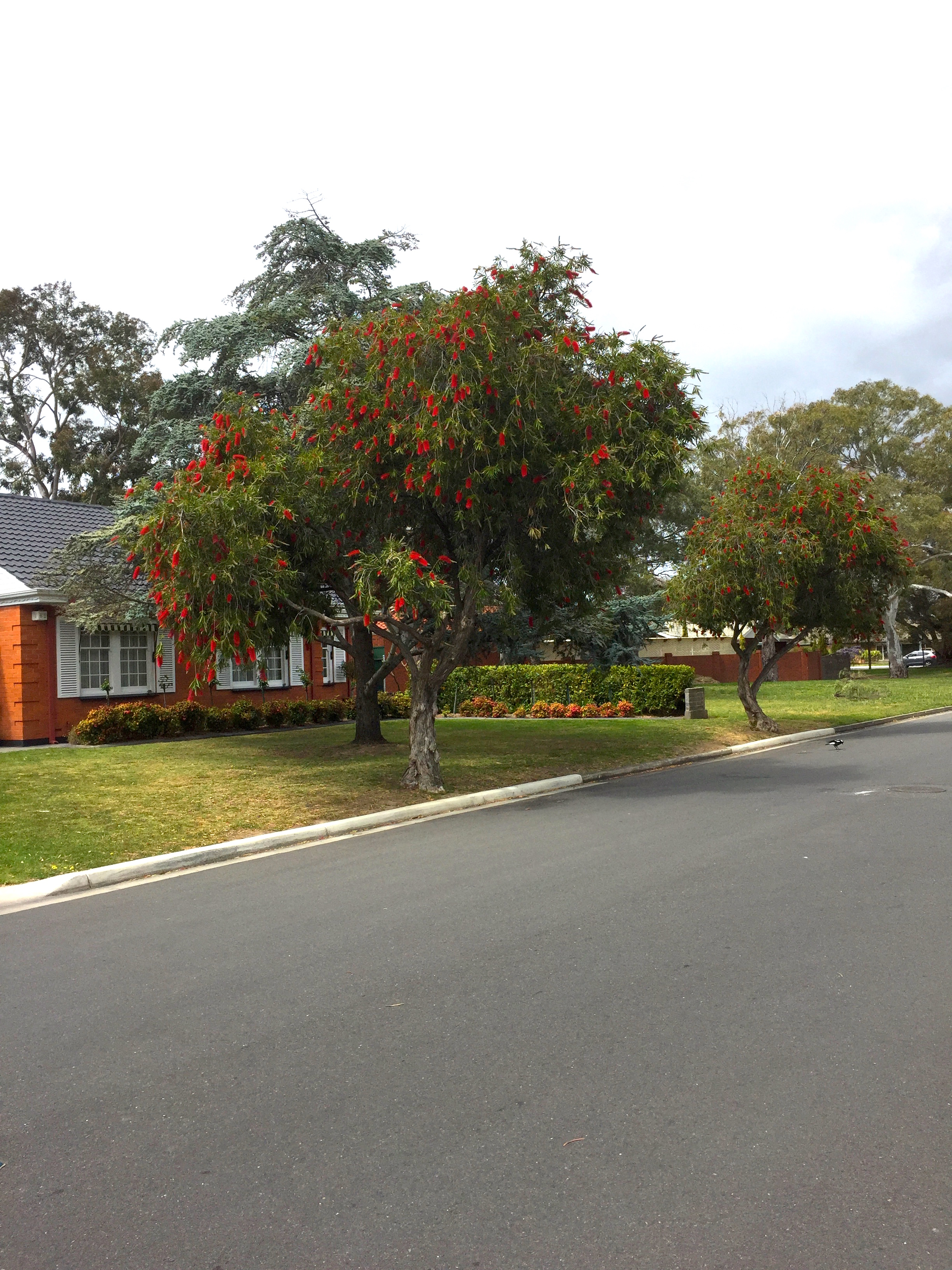
Callistemon viminalis in suburban Adelaide, South Australia.

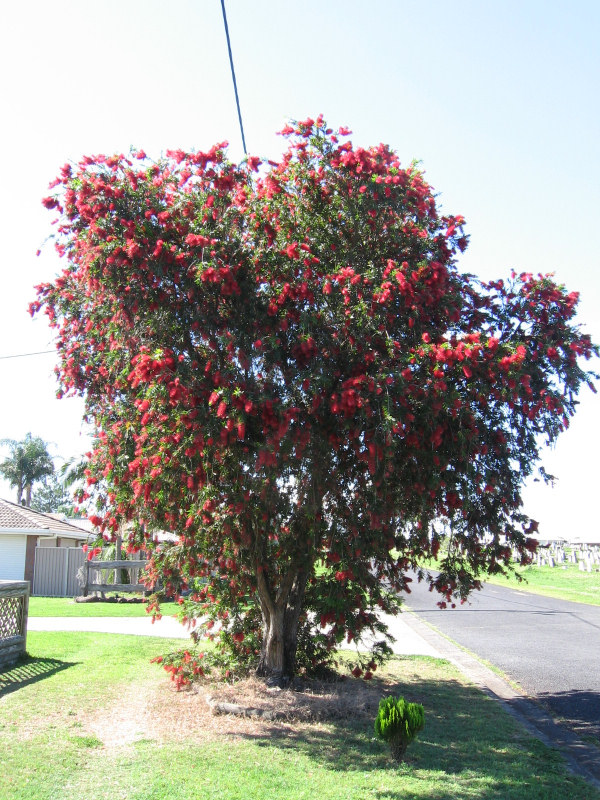
Callistemon viminalis

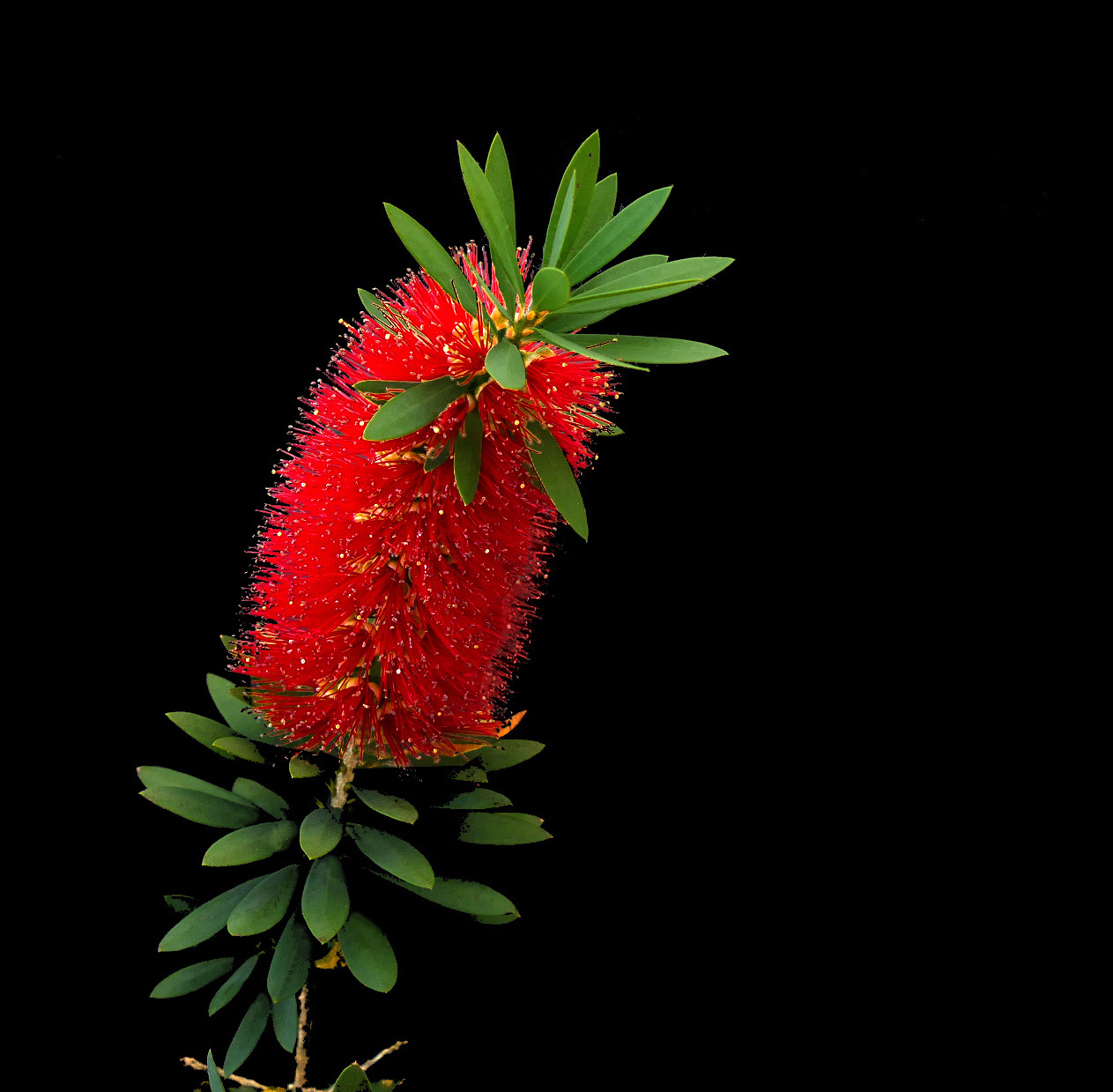
Bottlebrush or Little John -- Dwarf Callistemon

Not a lot of care is required. Only moderate watering is needed and they do best in deep, lighter soil. It is recommended to cut the flowers off as they wilt and cut the whole tree back every few years. When cutting back, a third should be cut at most. They do best in milder climates, since heavy frost can be damaging to them.

== Taxonomy ==
The Latin name Callistemon comes from the combination of 2 Greek words of 'callis' meaning beauty and 'stemon' meaning stamen, referring to the flowers of the plant.

The genus Callistemon was first formally described in 1814 by Robert Brown. In his description he noted that the genus includes “those species of Metrosideros that have inflorescence similar to that of Melaleuca, and distinct elongated filaments.” Carl Linnaeus had described the genus Melaleuca in 1767 and in 1867, George Bentham brought all the Metrosideros species into Melaleuca. Bentham described melaleucas as having stamens united in bundles opposite the (five) petals.

In his 1864 description of Callistemon salignus in Fragmenta phytographiae Australiae, Ferdinand von Mueller noted that the difference between the genera was “entirely artificial” (“omnino artificiale"). George Bentham also noted in Flora Australiensis that Callistemon “passes gradually into Melaleuca, with which F. Mueller proposes to unite it.” In 1876, Henri Ernest Baillon proposed in Histoire des Plantes that Callistemon, as well as Calothamnus and Lamarchea be merged into Melaleuca.

Nevertheless, most authors had preserved the distinction between the two genera Callistemon and Melaleuca until 1998. In that year, in recognition of the fact that the callistemons and melaleucas on New Caledonia were clearly related, Lyndley Craven and J.W. Dawson transferred the callistemons on that island to Melaleuca, even though some (e.g. Melaleuca pancheri) do not have stamens fused in 5 groups.

On the basis of DNA evidence, in 2006 and 2009 Craven moved all but four callistemons to melaleuca. Those four were Callistemon forresterae, Callistemon genofluvialis, Callistemon kenmorrisonii and Callistemon nyallingensis which were regarded as being hybrids.

The new description of Melaleuca has been accepted by some herbaria but not all. For example, the Queensland Herbarium accepts Melaleuca flammea (synonym Callistemon acuminatus) but the New South Wales Herbarium accepts Callistemon acuminatus. In 2012, Frank Udovicic and Roger Spencer transferred the newly described species of melaleuca with separate stamens (e.g. Melaleuca megalongensis and Melaleuca wimmerensis) to Callistemon (hence Callistemon megalongensis and Callistemon wimmerensis). Their argument is that using the DNA evidence is premature. They further argue that if all the genera Beaufortia, Callistemon, Calothamnus, Conothamnus, Eremaea, Melaleuca, Phymatocarpus were combined (as Craven has suggested), then there would be no characteristics that would define the group.

== Use in horticulture ==
Many commercial nurseries continue to use the name ‘’Callistemon’’. These species can be propagated either by cuttings (some species more easily than others), or from the seeds. Flowering is normally in spring and early summer (October–December), but conditions may cause flowering at other times of the year. The obvious parts of the flower masses are stamens, with the pollen at the tip of the filament; the petals are inconspicuous (see picture). Flower heads vary in colour with species; most are red, but some are yellow, green, orange, pink or white. Each flower head produces a profusion of triple-celled seed capsules around a stem (see picture) which remain on the plant with the seeds enclosed until stimulated to open when the plant dies or fire causes the release of the seeds. A few species release the seeds annually.

Bottlebrush plants can be grown in pots.

They have been grown in Europe since a specimen of Callistemon citrinus was introduced to Kew Gardens in London by Joseph Banks in 1789.

== Selected species ==
There are about 50 species of callistemon. They include:

- Callistemon acuminatus Cheel – Tapering-leaved bottlebrush (also known as Melaleuca flammea);
- Callistemon brachyandrus Lindl. – Prickly bottlebrush (also known as Melaleuca brachyandra);
- Callistemon chisholmii Cheel (also known as Melaleuca chisholmii);
- Callistemon citrinus (Curtis) Skeels – Lemon scented bottle brush (also known as Melaleuca citrina);
- Callistemon comboynensis Cheel – Cliff bottlebrush (also known as Melaleuca comboynensis);
- Callistemon flavovirens (Cheel) Cheel – Green bottlebrush (also known as Melaleuca flavovirens);
- Callistemon formosus S.T.Blake (also known as Melaleuca formosa);
- Callistemon forresterae Molyneux
- Callistemon genofluvialis Molyneux
- Callistemon glaucus Sweet (also known as Melaleuca glauca);
- Callistemon hemistictus (S.T.Blake ex Craven) Udovicic and R.D.Spencer (also known as Melaleuca hemisticta)(S.T.Blake ex Craven) Udovicic & R.D.Spencer;
- Callistemon kenmorrisonii Molyneux – Betka bottlebrush
- Callistemon lazaridis (Craven) Udovicic & R.D.Spencer (also known as Melaleuca lazaridis);
- Callistemon linearifolius (Link) DC. (also known as Melaleuca linearifolia);
- Callistemon linearis (Schrad. & J.C.Wendl.) Colvill ex Sweet (also known as Melaleuca linearis);
- Callistemon macropunctatus (Dum.Cours.) Court (also known as Melaleuca rugulosa);
- Callistemon megalongensis (Craven & S.M.Douglas) Udovicic & R.D.Spencer (also known as Melaleuca megalongensis);
- Callistemon montanus C.T.White ex S.T.Blake – Mountain bottlebrush (also known as Melaleuca montana);
- Callistemon montis-zamiae (Craven) Udovicic & R.D.Spencer (also known as Melaleuca montis-zamia);
- Callistemon nyallingensis Molyneux
- Callistemon pachyphyllus Cheel – Wallum bottlebrush (also known as Melaleuca pachyphylla);
- Callistemon pallidus (Bonpl.) DC. – Lemon bottlebrush (also known as Melaleuca pallida);
- Callistemon pauciflorus R.D.Spencer & Lumley (also known as Melaleuca faucicola);
- Callistemon pearsonii R.D.Spencer & Lumley (also known as Melaleuca pearsonii);
- Callistemon phoeniceus Lindl. – Lesser bottlebrush (also known as Melaleuca phoenicea);
- Callistemon pinifolius (Wendl.) Sweet – Pine-leaved bottlebrush (also known as Melaleuca linearis);
- Callistemon pityoides F.Muell. – Alpine bottlebrush (also known as Melaleuca pityoides);
- Callistemon polandii F.M.Bailey (also known as Melaleuca polandii);
- Callistemon pungens Lumley & R.D.Spencer (also known as Melaleuca williamsii);
- Callistemon purpurascens S.M.Douglas & S.David
- Callistemon pyramidalis (Craven) Udovicic & R.D.Spencer (also known as Melaleuca pyramidalis);
- Callistemon quercinus (Craven) Udovicic & R.D.Spencer (also known as Melaleuca quercina);
- Callistemon recurvus R.D.Spencer & Lumley (also known as Melaleuca recurva);
- Callistemon rugulosus (Schltdl. ex Link) DC. – Scarlet bottlebrush (also known as Melaleuca rugulosa);
- Callistemon sabrina (Craven) Udovicic & R.D.Spencer (also known as Melaleuca sabrina);
- Callistemon salignus (Sm.) Sweet – Willow bottlebrush, white bottlebrush (also known as Melaleuca salicina);
- Callistemon serpentinus (Craven) Udovicic & R.D.Spencer (also known as Melaleuca serpentina);
- Callistemon shiressii Blakely (also known as Melaleuca shiressii);
- Callistemon sieberi DC. (also known as Melaleuca paludicola);
- Callistemon speciosus (Sims) Sweet (also known as Melaleuca glauca);
- Callistemon subulatus Cheel (also known as Melaleuca subulata);
- Callistemon teretifolius F.Muell. – Needle bottlebrush, Flinders Ranges bottlebrush (also known as Melaleuca orophila);
- Callistemon viminalis (Sol. ex Gaertn.) G.Don – Weeping bottlebrush (also known as Melaleuca viminalis);
- Callistemon viridiflorus (Sims) Sweet (also known as Melaleuca virens);
- Callistemon wimmerensis Marriott & G.W.Carr (also known as Melaleuca wimmerensis)

== Gallery ==
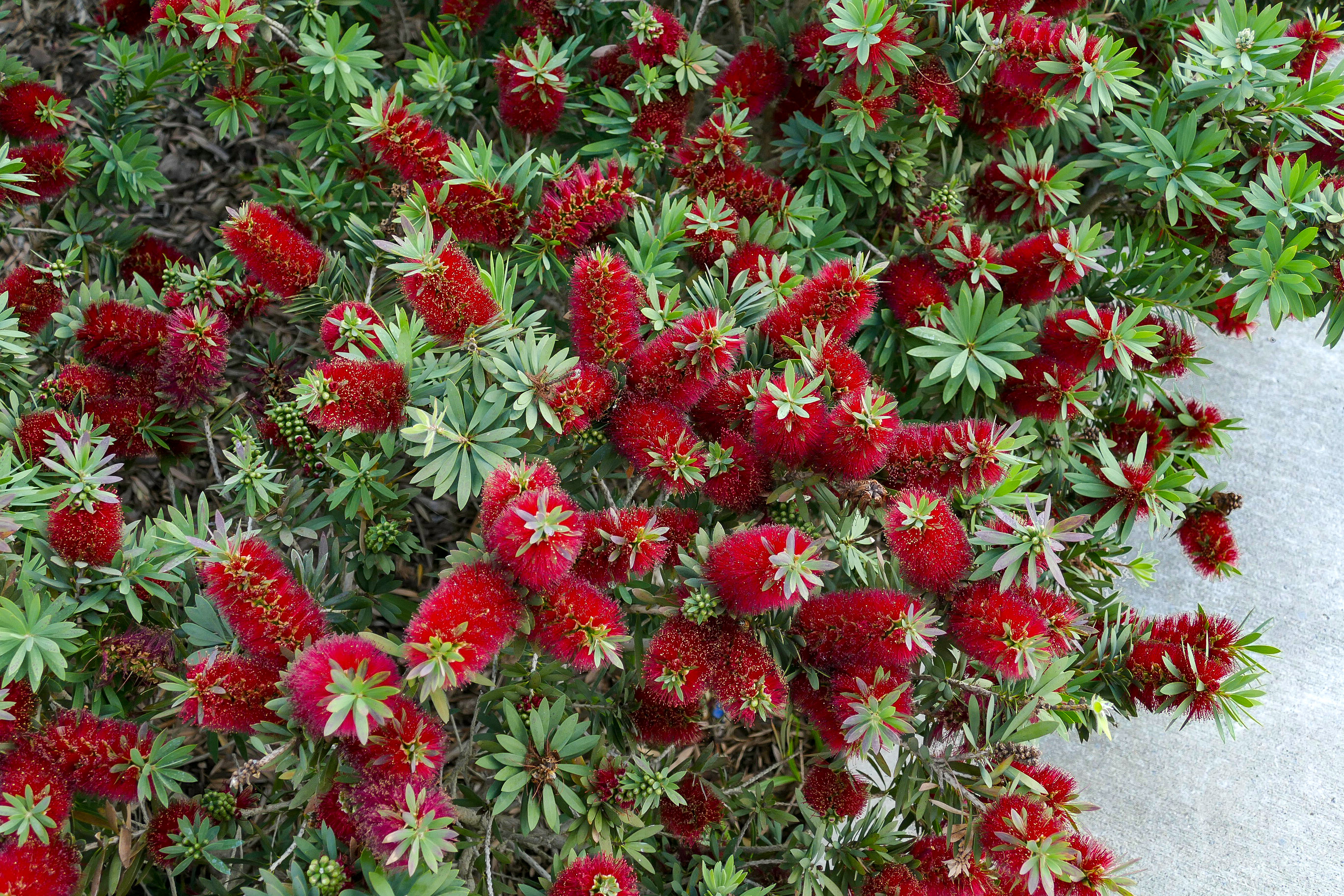
Callistemon "Little John" or dwarf bottlebrush - a Callistemon cultivar

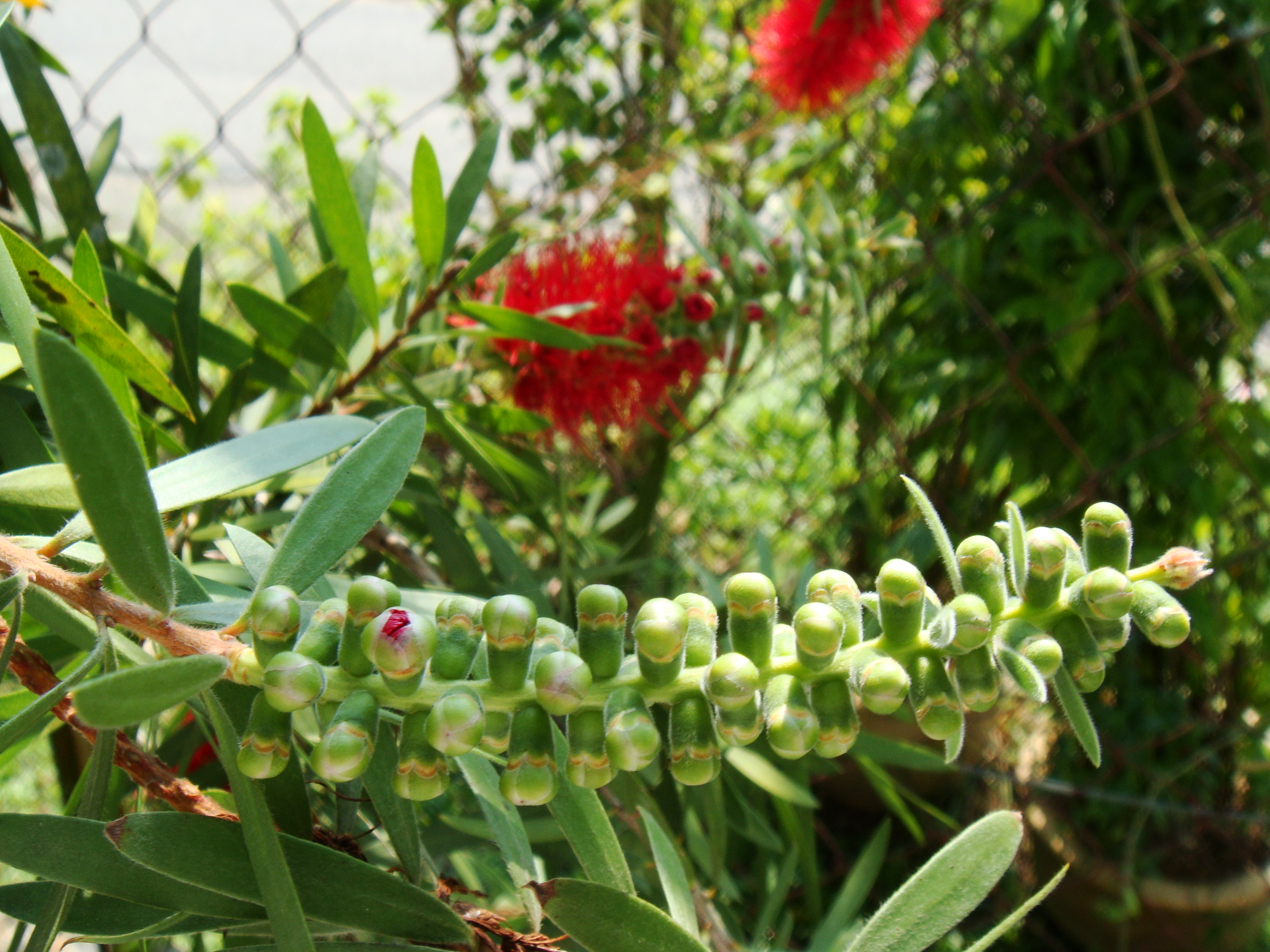
Foreground: Bottlebrush buds. Background: Partial blooming bottlebrush flower.

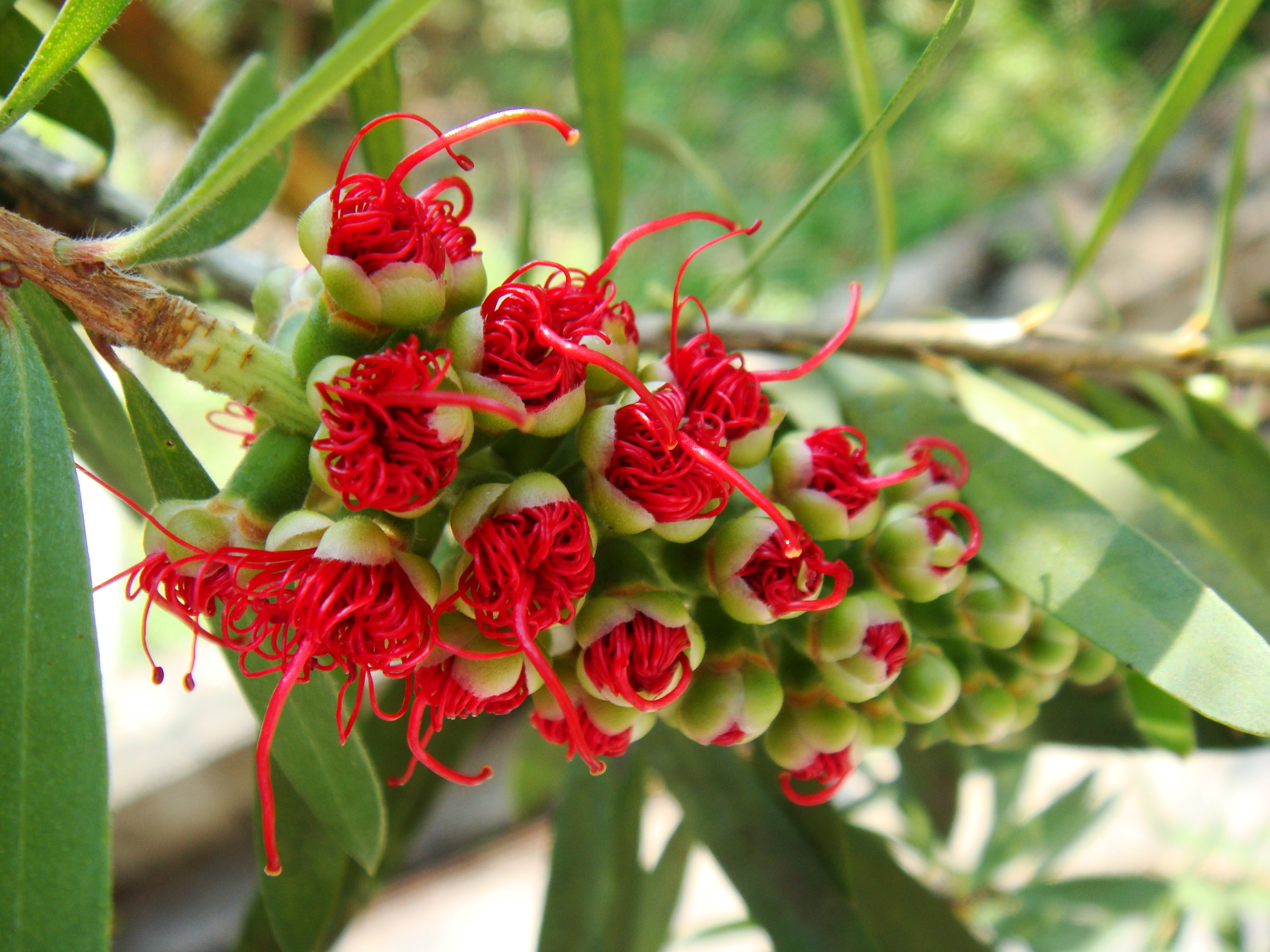
Blooming bottlebrush found in Kelantan, Malaysia.

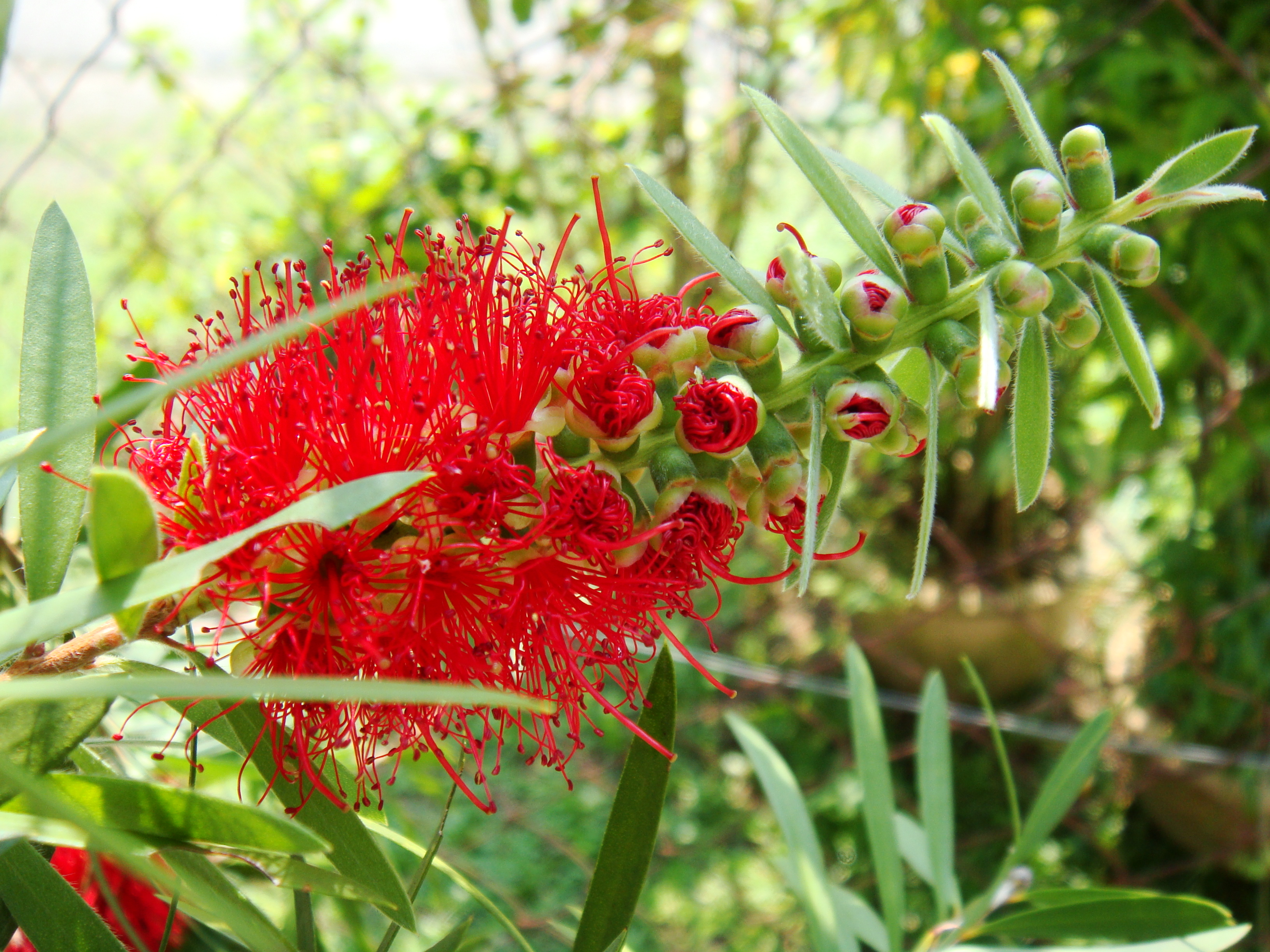
Bottlebrush flower partial blooming found in Kelantan, Malaysia.

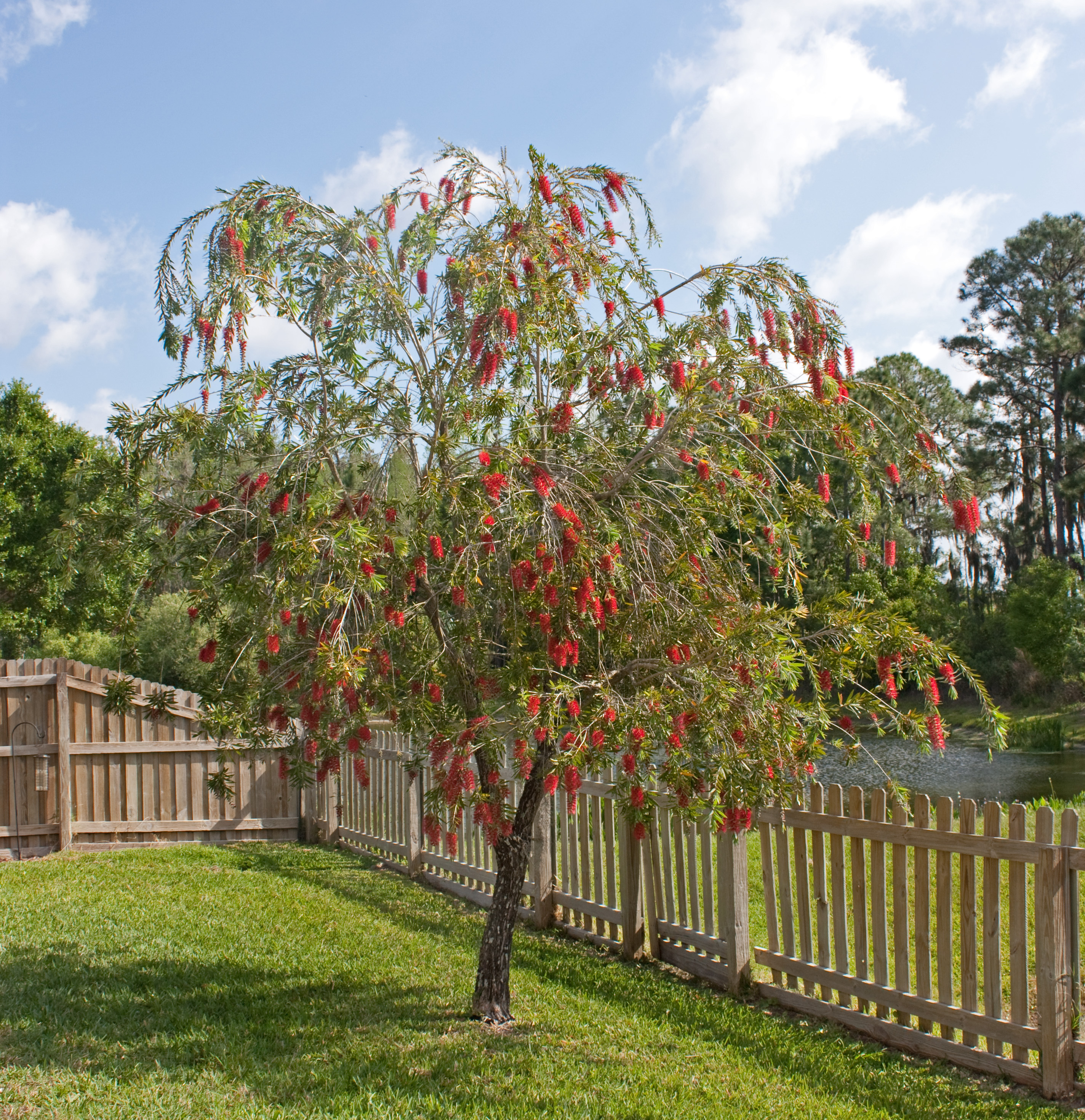
Tree in bloom in Florida.

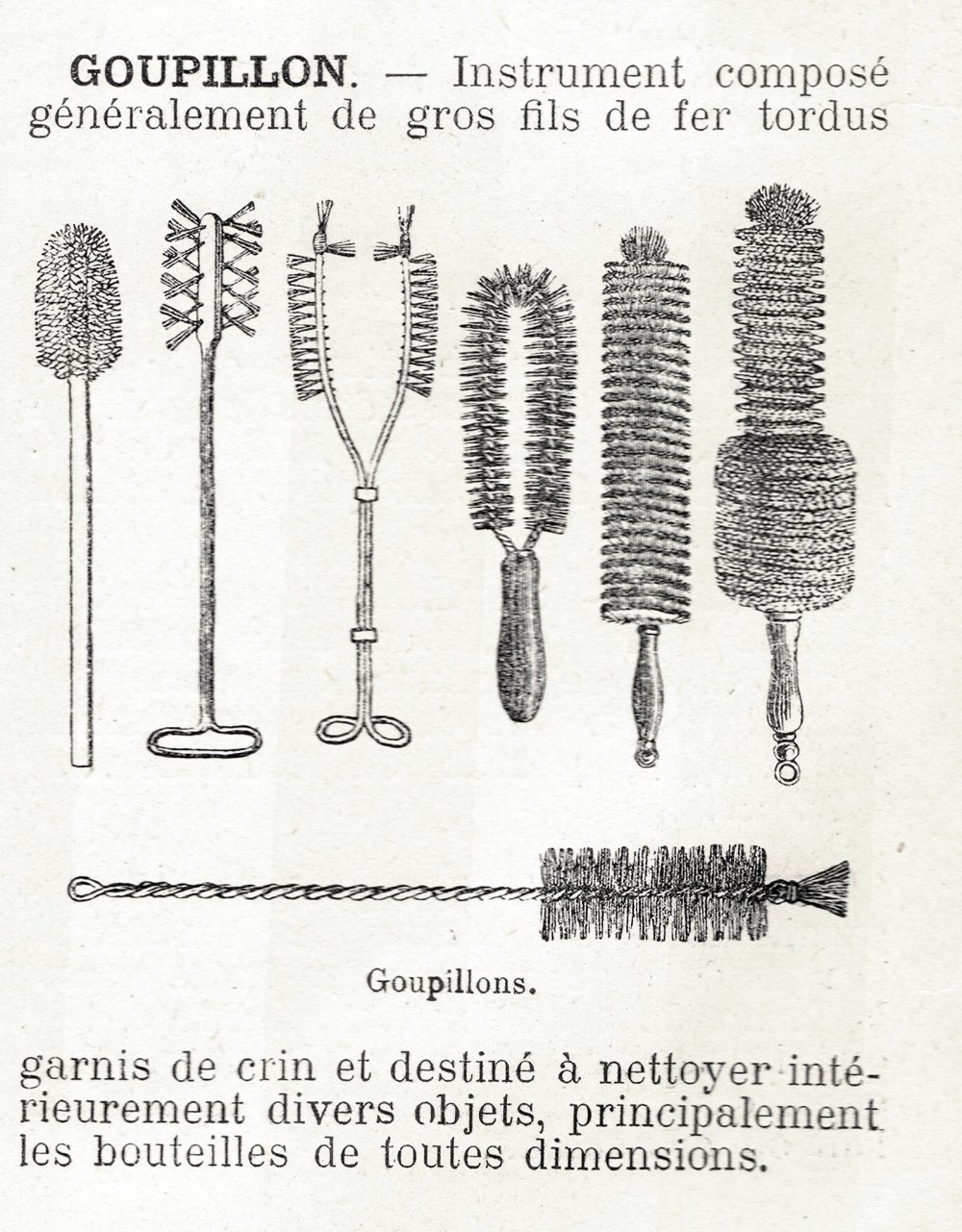
Illustration showing bottle brushes, the eponym of the plant

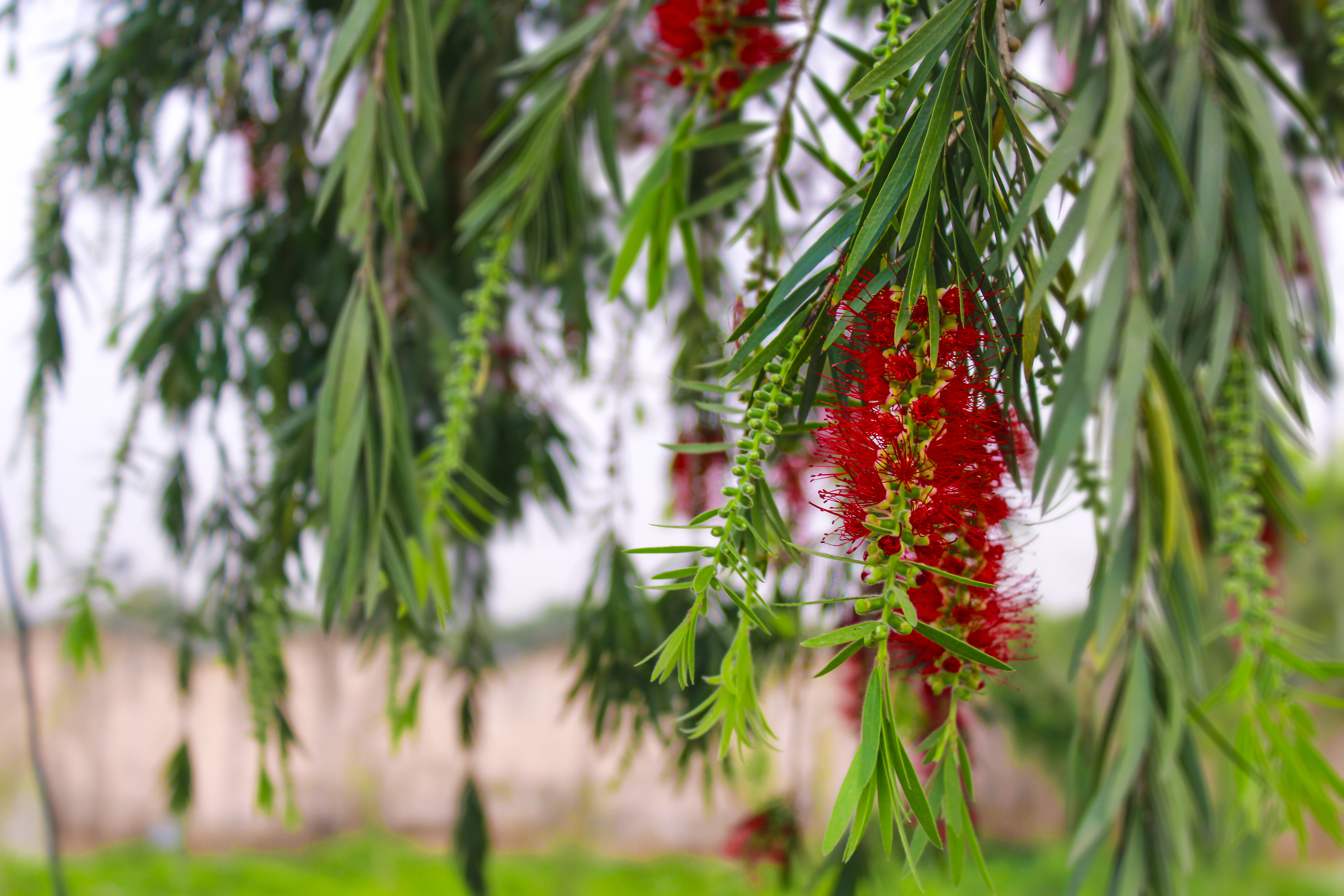
Callistemon Bottlebrush

== See also ==
- List of Callistemon cultivars
