= Scarlet bottlebrush =

Scarlet bottlebrush is a common name for several plants and may refer to:

- Callistemon brachyandrus
- Callistemon rugulosus, endemic to South Australia and Victoria
