= Melaleuca lazaridis =

Scientific classification
- Kingdom: Plantae
- Clade: Tracheophytes
- Clade: Angiosperms
- Clade: Eudicots
- Clade: Rosids
- Order: Myrtales
- Family: Myrtaceae
- Genus: Melaleuca
- Species: M. lazaridis

Binomial name
- Melaleuca lazaridis Craven

Synonyms
- Callistemon lazaridis (Craven) Udovicic & R.D.Spencer

Species of flowering plant

Melaleuca lazaridis is a plant in the myrtle family, Myrtaceae and is endemic to the Blackdown Tableland National Park in Queensland. (Some Australian state herbaria use the name Callistemon lazaridis). It is a shrub with dark green leaves and red flowers spikes tipped with yellow.

== Description ==
Melaleuca lazaridis is a shrub growing to 4 m (10 ft) tall with hard, fibrous bark. Its leaves are arranged alternately and are 43–119 mm (2–5 in) long, 4.5–17 mm (0.2–0.7 in) wide, flat, mostly narrow egg-shaped with a mid-vein and 9 to 29 branching veins.

The flowers are arranged in spikes on the ends of branches that continue to grow after flowering and also on the sides of the branches. The spikes are 35–60 mm (1–2 in) in diameter with 25 to 60 individual flowers. The petals are 4.5–6.5 mm (0.18–0.26 in) long and fall off as the flower ages. There are 48-59 stamens in each flower with red to deep pink filaments and yellow anthers. Flowering occurs from June to September and is followed by fruit that are woody capsules, 4.5–5.7 mm (0.18–0.22 in) long.

== Taxonomy and naming ==
Melaleuca lazaridis was first formally described in 2006 by Lyndley Craven in Novon. The specific epithet (lazaridis) honours Michael Lazarides, an Australian botanical collector, agrostologist and co-collector of the type specimen.

Callistemon lazaridis is regarded as a synonym of Melaleuca lazaridis by Plants of the World Online.

== Distribution and habitat ==
This melaleuca only occurs in the Blackdown Tableland National Park, where it grows in a range of habitats but often near sandstone in open forest and along creeks.
