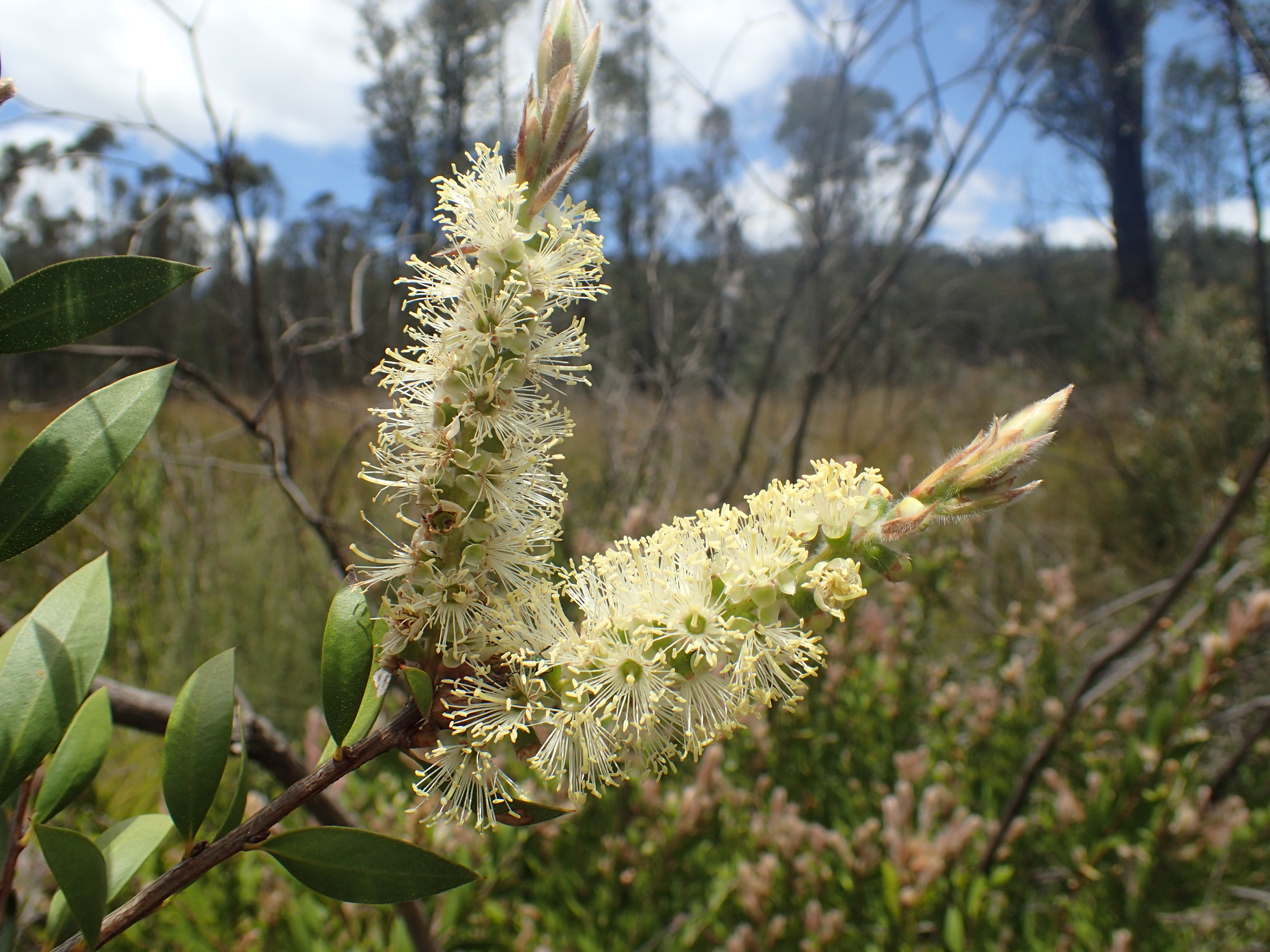

Scientific classification
- Kingdom: Plantae
- Clade: Tracheophytes
- Clade: Angiosperms
- Clade: Eudicots
- Clade: Rosids
- Order: Myrtales
- Family: Myrtaceae
- Genus: Melaleuca
- Species: M. pallida

Binomial name
- Melaleuca pallida (Bonpl.) Craven

Synonyms
- Callistemon pallidus (Bonpl.) DC.; Metrosideros pallida Bonpl.

= Melaleuca pallida =

Lemon bottlebrush

Species of flowering plant

Melaleuca pallida, commonly known as lemon bottlebrush, is a plant in the myrtle family, Myrtaceae and is endemic to eastern Australia. (Some Australian state herbaria use the name Callistemon pallidus.) It is an upright shrub with thin, spreading branches, silvery new growth and pale yellow, sometimes pinkish bottlebrush flowers.

== Description ==
Melaleuca pallida is a shrub or tree growing to 8 m (30 ft) tall, with fibrous or papery bark. Its leaves are arranged alternately and are 20–79 mm (0.8–3 in) long, 4–17 mm (0.2–0.7 in) wide, flat or broadly v-shaped, narrow elliptic to egg-shaped with the narrow end towards the base and with a small point at the end. There is a distinct mid-vein, 6-16 indistinct side veins and many distinct oil glands.

The flowers are a shade of cream to yellow, occasionally pinkish-red and are arranged in spikes on the ends of branches that continue to grow after flowering and sometimes also on the sides of the branches. The spikes are 20–45 mm (0.8–2 in) in diameter with 15 to 50 individual flowers. The petals are 2.9–6 mm (0.1–0.2 in) long and fall off as the flower ages and there are 34–70 stamens in each flower. Flowering occurs from October to February and is followed by fruit that are woody, cup-shaped capsules, 3.9–6.6 mm (0.2–0.3 in) long.

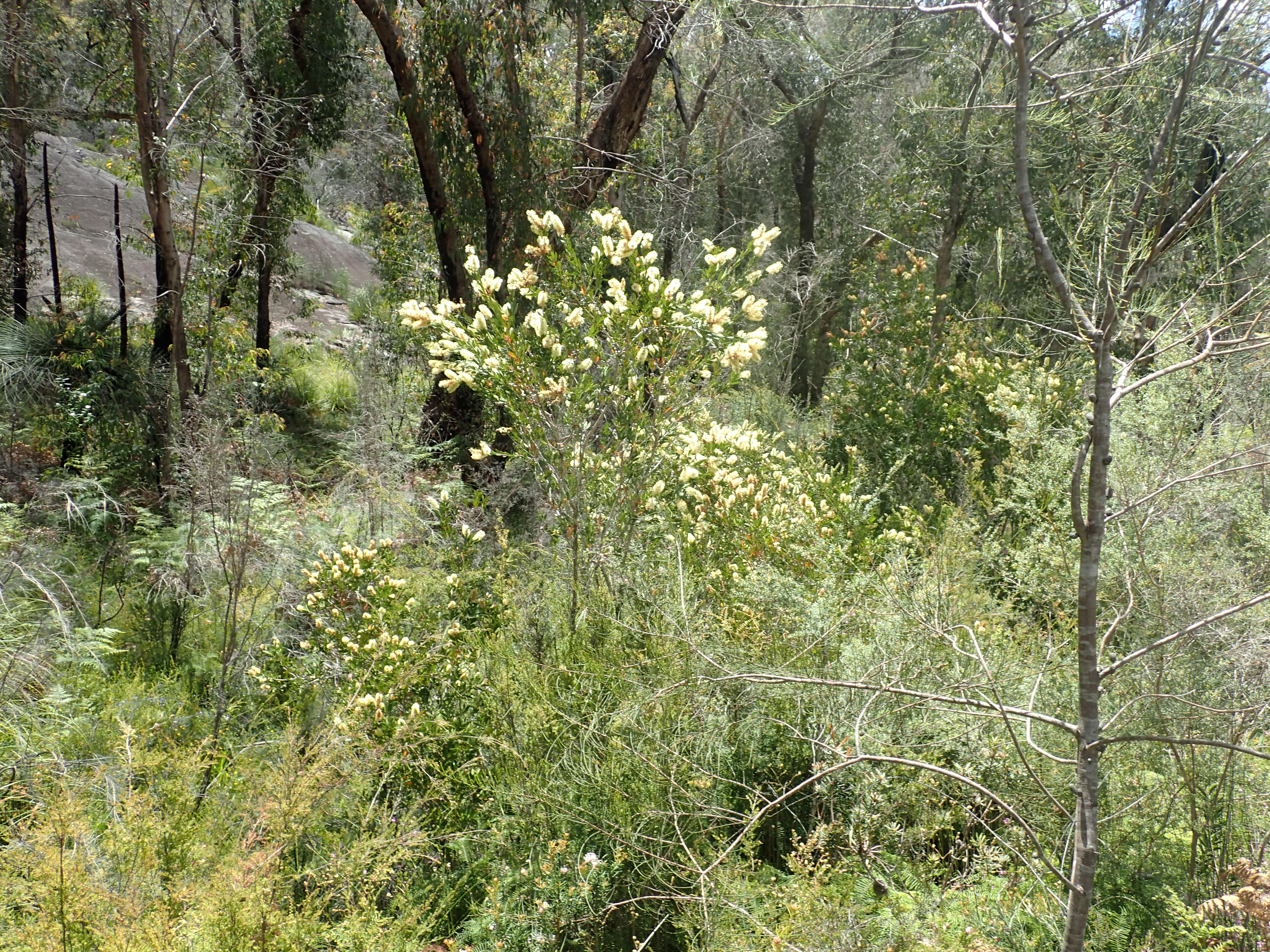
Habit in the Gibraltar Range National Park

== Taxonomy and naming ==
The lemon bottlebrush was first formally described in 1816 by Aimé Bonpland, who gave it the name Metrosideros pallida and published the description in Description des plantes rares cultivées à Malmaison et à Navarre. In 1828, de Candolle changed the name to Callistemon pallidus and in 2006 Lyndley Craven changed the name to Melaleuca pallida. The specific epithet (pallida) is a Latin word meaning "pale" referring to the pale flower colour.

Callistemon pallidus is regarded as a synonym of Melaleuca pallida by Plants of the World Online.

== Distribution and habitat ==
Melaleuca pallida occurs from the Border Ranges area in far south eastern Queensland, through the ranges and slopes of New South Wales to eastern Victoria. It is also present in all but the far west of Tasmania and on some Bass Strait islands. It grows in streams and wet, rocky slopes.

== Use in horticulture ==
Melaleuca pallida is sometimes cultivated as Callistemon pallidus. It is a hardy plant, adaptable to many soils but needs full sun.

== Gallery ==
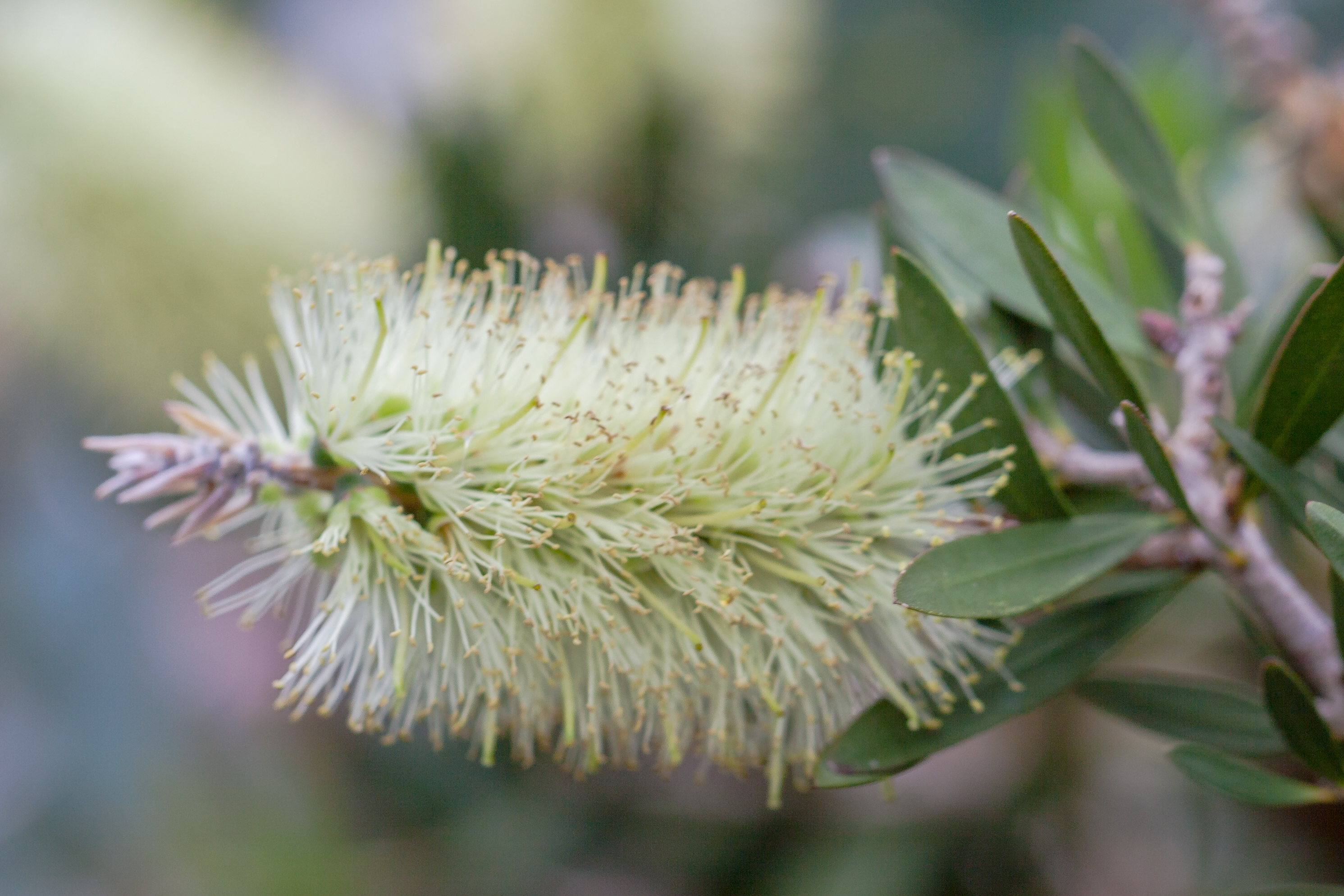
In the Munich Botanic Garden as Callistemon pallidus

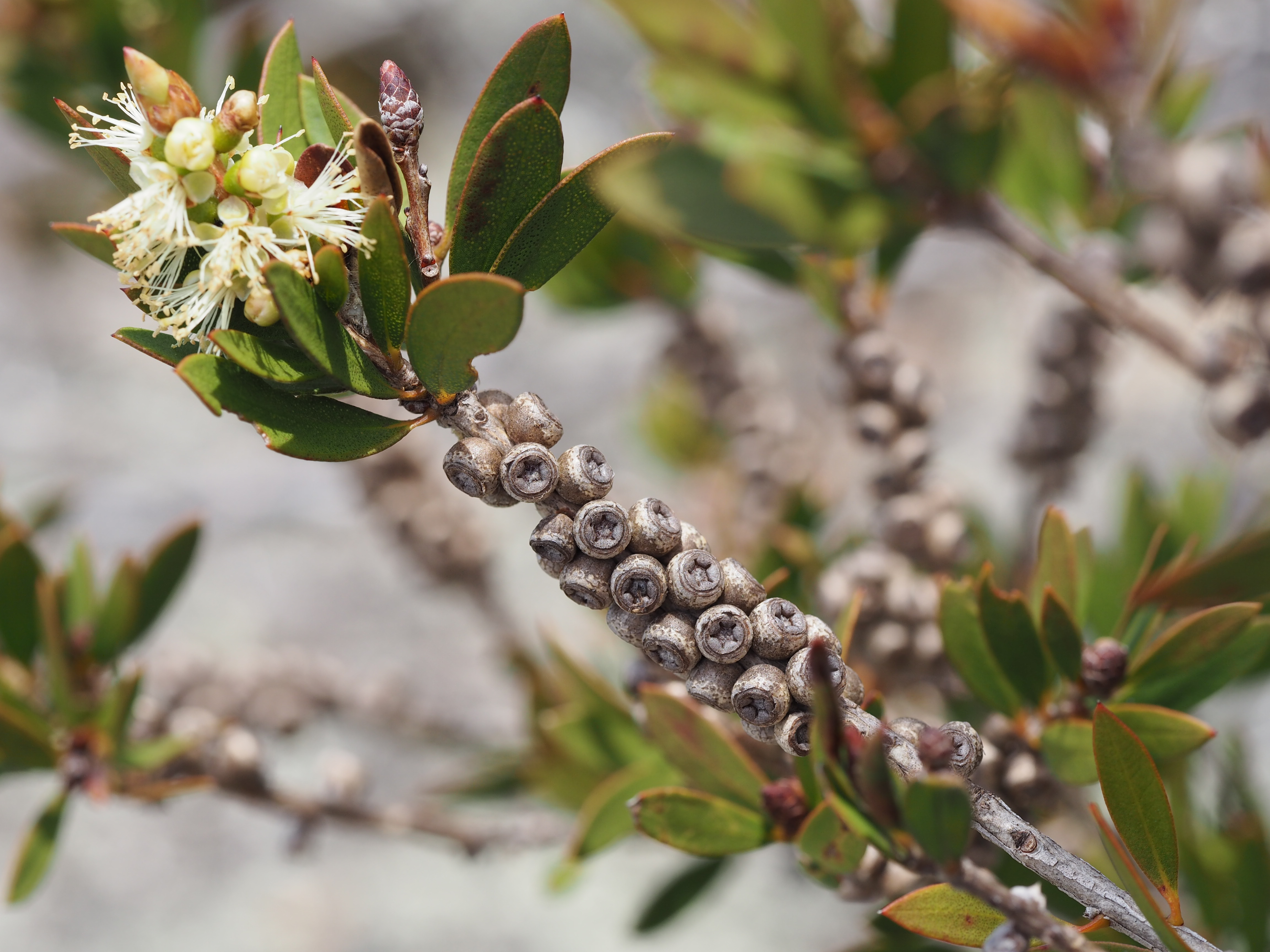
Leaves and fruit

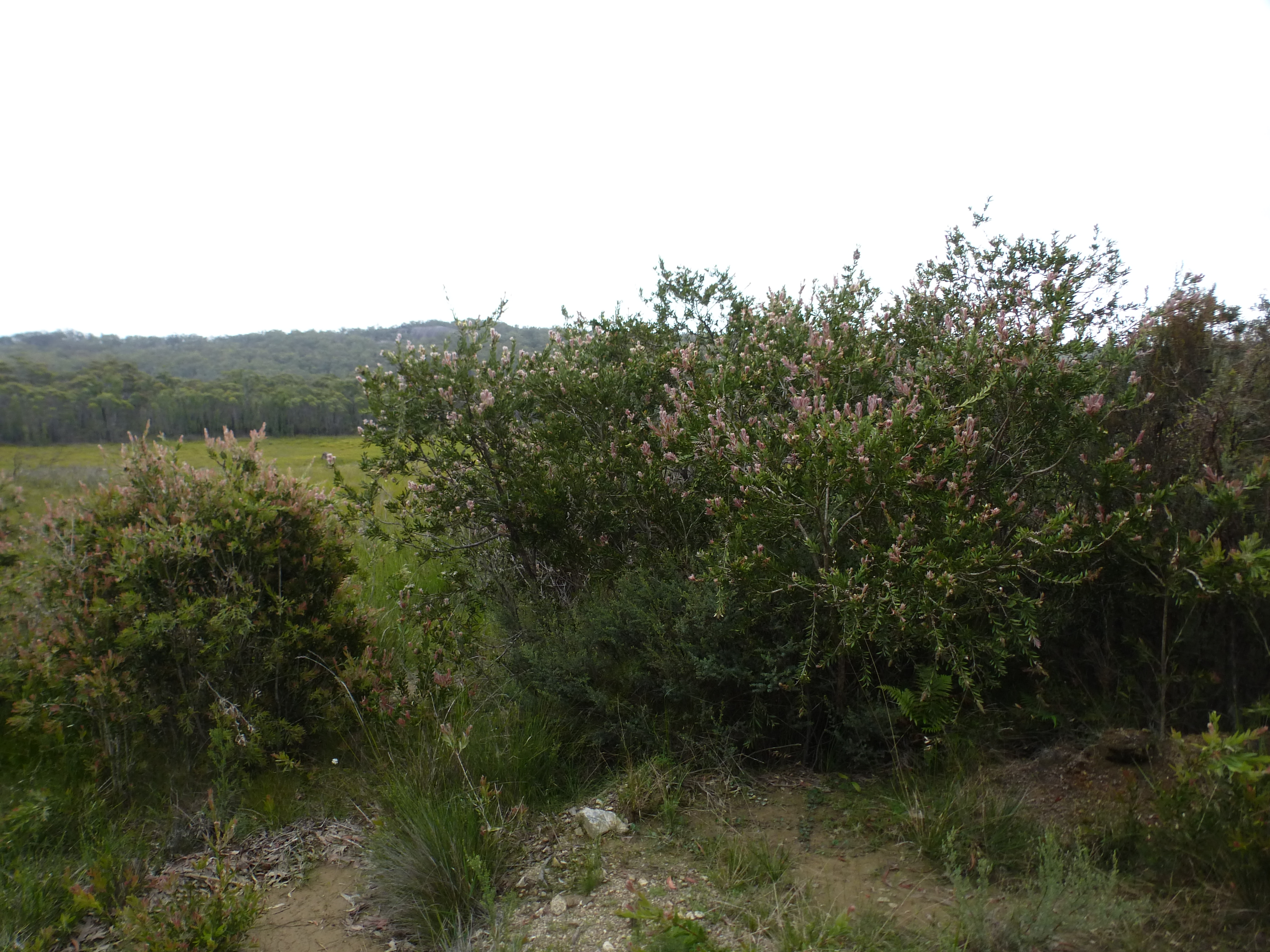
Near wet heath in the Gibraltar Range

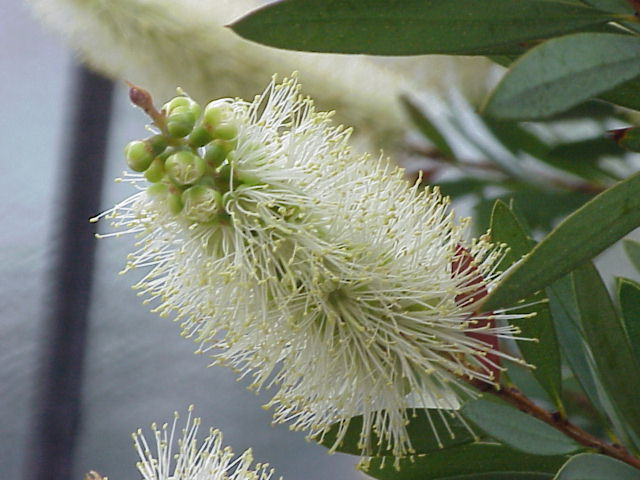
Pale bottlebrush (Callistemon pallidus) in bloom
