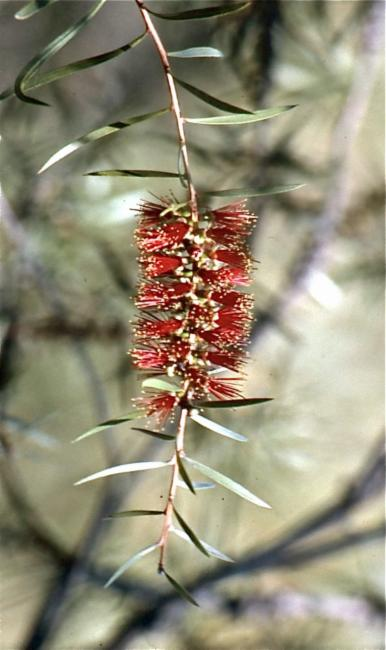
- In White Mountains National Park

Scientific classification
- Kingdom: Plantae
- Clade: Tracheophytes
- Clade: Angiosperms
- Clade: Eudicots
- Clade: Rosids
- Order: Myrtales
- Family: Myrtaceae
- Genus: Melaleuca
- Species: M. chisholmii

Binomial name
- Melaleuca chisholmii (Cheel) Craven

Synonyms
- Callistemon chisholmi Cheel

= Melaleuca chisholmii =

Burra bottlebrush

Species of shrub

Melaleuca chisholmii commonly known as Burra bottlebrush is a plant in the myrtle family, Myrtaceae and is endemic to Queensland. It is a shrub with rough bark, an open habit and spiky foliage but in winter has bright red flower spikes tipped with yellow.

== Description ==
Melaleuca chisholmii is a shrub growing to 3–4 m (9.8–13.1 ft) tall with rough, dark grey or fibrous brown bark. Its leaves are arranged alternately and are 25–100 mm (0.98–3.94 in) long, 1–7 mm (0.039–0.276 in) wide, flat, linear to narrow egg-shaped with the narrower end near the base and with the end tapering to a sharp point.

The flowers are arranged in spikes on the ends of branches that continue to grow after flowering. The spikes are up to 4–50 mm (0.16–1.97 in) in diameter and 60–80 mm (2.4–3.1 in) long with ten to thirty individual flowers. The petals are 3.1–5.6 mm (0.12–0.22 in) long and fall off as the flower ages. There are 25 to 57 stamens in each flower, with red filaments red yellow anthers. Flowering occurs from May to August and is followed by fruit that are woody capsules, 3.7–6.1 mm (0.15–0.24 in) long in cylindrical spikes that remain on the stem for a lengthy period.

== Taxonomy and naming ==
Burra bottlebrush was first formally described in 1925 by Edwin Cheel, who gave it the name Callistemon chisholmii in the Proceedings of the Linnean Society of New South Wales from a specimen collected on the "western watershed, Thompson River Fall, North Queensland". In 2006 Lyndley Craven changed the name to Melaleuca chisholmii in the journal Novon. (Cheel gave the incorrect spelling Callistemon chisholmi.) The specific epithet (chisholmii) honours J.R. Chisholm (1855-1927), a botanical collector who collected the type specimen of this species.

Some Australian state herbaria continue to use the name Callistemon chisholmii, but Melaleuca chisholmii is the accepted name in Queensland. Callistemon chisholmii is regarded as a synonym of Melaleuca chisholmii by the Royal Botanic Gardens, Kew.

== Distribution and habitat ==
This melaleuca occurs in higher areas of central Queensland in woodland and forest near watercourses.

== Conservation status ==
Burra bottlebrush is listed as of least concern under the Queensland Government Nature Conservation Act 1992.

== Use in horticulture ==
Melaleuca chisholmii is a hardy plant from dry inland areas but has been grown successfully in Townsville.
