= Roger David Spencer =

Roger David Spencer (born 6 October 1945) is a British-Australian horticultural botanist who was born at Alfreton, Derbyshire. He has an honours degree in botany from the University College of Wales, Aberystwyth, a master's degree and doctorate from the University of Melbourne (in phycology) and a technical certificate in gardening and turf maintenance from Oakleigh Technical College, Melbourne. He is currently horticultural botanist at the Royal Botanic Gardens Melbourne where he works in the Plant Identification Service, contributing locally and internationally to the study of cultivated plant taxonomy.

He has written popular articles on horticultural taxonomy for various journals and newspapers and has a regular column on plant names for Australian Horticulture. He has also written books on topics including landscape conservation, elms and silver foliage plants. Between 1995 and 2005 he compiled the five-volume Horticultural Flora of South-eastern Australia. He is the co-author of the book Sustainable Gardens and an international third edition of the booklet Plant Names. He has contributed to the Australian native floras of Victoria, New South Wales and South Australia, and was for several years chairman of the Australian Cultivar Registration Authority.

== Selection of Publications ==
- Spencer, R.D. 1987. Growing Silver, Grey and Blue Foliage Plants. Kangaroo Press, Kenthurst. ISBN 0-86417-108-0.
- Spencer, R.D., Hawker, J. & Lumley, P. F. 1991. Elms in Australia. Ornamental Plants 3. Royal Botanic Gardens, Melbourne. ISBN 0-7241-9962-4.
- Spencer, R.D. 1995-2005. A Horticultural Flora of South-eastern Australia. Volumes 1-5. Univ. NSW Press, Sydney.
- Spencer, R.D., Cross, R.J. Lumley, P.F. 2007. Plant Names, A Guide To Botanical Nomenclature. Edition 3. CSIRO Publishing, Collingwood. ISBN 0-643-09440-7.
- Cross, R. & Spencer, R. 2009. Sustainable Gardens. CSIRO Publishing, Collingwood. ISBN 0-643-09422-9.
- Spencer, R.D. & Cross, R.G. 2007. "The cultigen". Taxon 56(3):938-940
- Spencer, R.D. & Lumley, P.F. 1986. Two new species of Callistemon R.Br. Muelleria 6:293-298
- Lumley, P.F. & Spencer, R.D. 1990. Two new species of Callistemon R.Br. (Myrtaceae). Muelleria 7(2):253-258
- Spencer, R.D. 1999. "Cultivated Plants and the Codes Of Nomenclature – Towards The Resolution of a Demarcation Dispute". In: S. Andrews, A.C. Leslie and C. Alexander (eds). Taxonomy of Cultivated Plants: Third International Symposium, pp. 171–181. Royal Botanic Gardens, Kew.

== See also ==
- List of botanists

== Bibliography ==
- Aitken, Richard & Looker, Michael (2002). The Oxford Companion to Australian Gardens. Melbourne: Oxford University Press. ISBN 0-19-553644-4.
