= Bolivia, New South Wales =

Bolivia
- Town
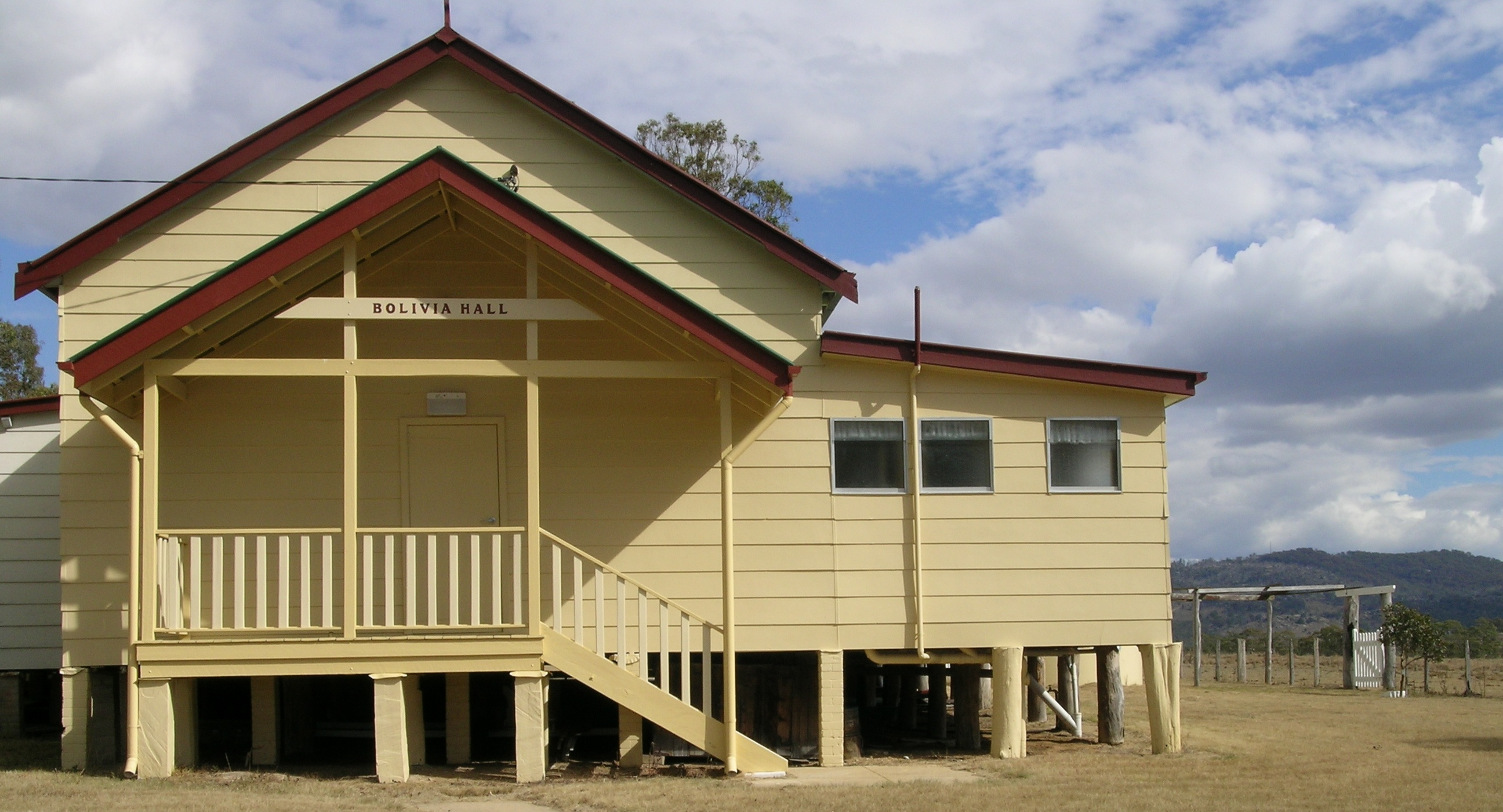
- Bolivia Hall with Bolivia Hill in the background

- Coordinates: 29°18′S 151°57′E
- Country: Australia
- State: New South Wales
- LGA: Tenterfield Shire
- Location: 665 km (413 mi) N of Sydney; 306 km (190 mi) SW of Brisbane; 159 km (99 mi) N of Armidale; 61 km (38 mi) N of Glen Innes; 18 km (11 mi) NE of Deepwater

Government
  - State electorate: Lismore
  - Federal division: New England
- Elevation: 830 m (2,720 ft)

Population
  - Total: 66 (2016)
- Postcode: 2372
- County: Clive County

Bolivia is a locality on the Northern Tablelands in the New England region of New South Wales, Australia. The remains of the settlement comprises the former Bolivia Hotel, a disused post office, a disused railway siding and a community hall.

== History ==
The area where Bolivia was established is the territory of the Ngarabal people. In the Ngarabal language, the area is known as Bilba, meaning big bushes. This area has continued to remain significant to Ngarabal people since European settlement, containing significant sacred sites and ceremony grounds. There are records of 300 Aboriginal people taking part in a corroboree there in the 1870s.

The first European settlement was in 1840, with the establishment of a sheep station owned by a squatter named Edward Hurry. Hurry had previously spent some years in Bolivia in South America, and chose this name for the land around his property. Hurry's sheep contracted catarrh and he sold Bolivia to Sir Stuart Donaldson who then held the property until 1843.

During the 1840s, Bolivia was bought by Edward Irby. There was fierce Ngarabal resistance to Irby's incursion into their traditional territory, culminating in numerous expeditions led by Irby, together with Thomas Windeyer and his servants, Connor and Weaving, seeking retaliation against Ngarabal killings of men associated with their land holdings. Irby's memoirs record that on one of these expeditions, in 1842, they "routed" around 100 Aboriginal people, burning their camp and all of their property. On another, on October 17, 1844, Irby recounts that he and the men "punish(ed) severely" a group of Aboriginal people hiding in the rocks who they held responsible for the killing of one of their men.

During the 1880s a township developed towards the foot of Bolivia Hill as the railway was extended through the area. The town supported two bakeries, two butchers, two general stores, a produce store, a post and telegraph office and the railway offices, workshop and stables etc. The first school opened in 1883 and closed in 1886. Several other schools opened later and one was operating up until November 1966. Bolivia Post Office opened on 30 April 1883 and closed in 1982.

In 1981 the name Bolivia was assigned to the region covered by the various farms comprising Hurry's original estate, and is now an address locality for the farming properties scattered to the north and northeast of Deepwater.

The former Bolivia Hotel on the New England Highway has been listed on the Register of the National Estate. This building was constructed c. 1840-1860 as a Cobb & Co. coach changing station and was later used as a post office and boarding house. Coach horses required regular changing about every 10 to 25 km in order to provide quick transport. These hotels were known as a "Changing Station" and here passengers and horses could have something to eat or stay overnight.

The Bolivia School of Arts building was erected 1914 on land donated by A.M. White of Bolivia Station. Many minerals have been mined in the region including bismuth, gold, tin, silver, high quality silica and arsenic.

The Bolivia Cemetery was dedicated in July 1884 and officially closed in February 1986. This and the Bolivia Station Cemetery were used regularly until c.1900 but have had little use since then. No headstones remain and a few plants and depressions in the ground are the only indication of the cemetery there.

== Geography ==
Bolivia occupies land to the north of Deepwater Creek and along both sides of Splitters Swamp Creek. A series of rough granite outcrops dominate the landscape on either side of the creek beds. Little Bolivia Hill rises approximately eighty metres above Deepwater Creek on the southern boundary of the locality.

== Flora ==
Bolivia Hill and the adjacent nature reserve are the only recorded locations of the endangered Bolivia Hill Boronia (Boronia boliviensis), Bolivia Homoranthus (Homoranthus croftianus), Bolivia Stringybark (Eucalyptus boliviana), the shrub Bolivia Hill Pimelea (Pimelea venosa) and the vulnerable Bolivia wattle (Acacia pycnostachya).

== Sports ==
Tennis, cricket, pigeon shooting, polo and horse racing were among the popular sports that were held at Bolivia.

== Industries ==
Local industries include wine growing and beef cattle farms. In May 2001 a Red Angus bull from Bolivia was sold for an Australian record price of $17,500.

== Bolivia railway station ==
Preceding station	Former services	Following station
Sandy Flat towards Wallangarra	Main Northern Line	Deepwater towards Sydney
