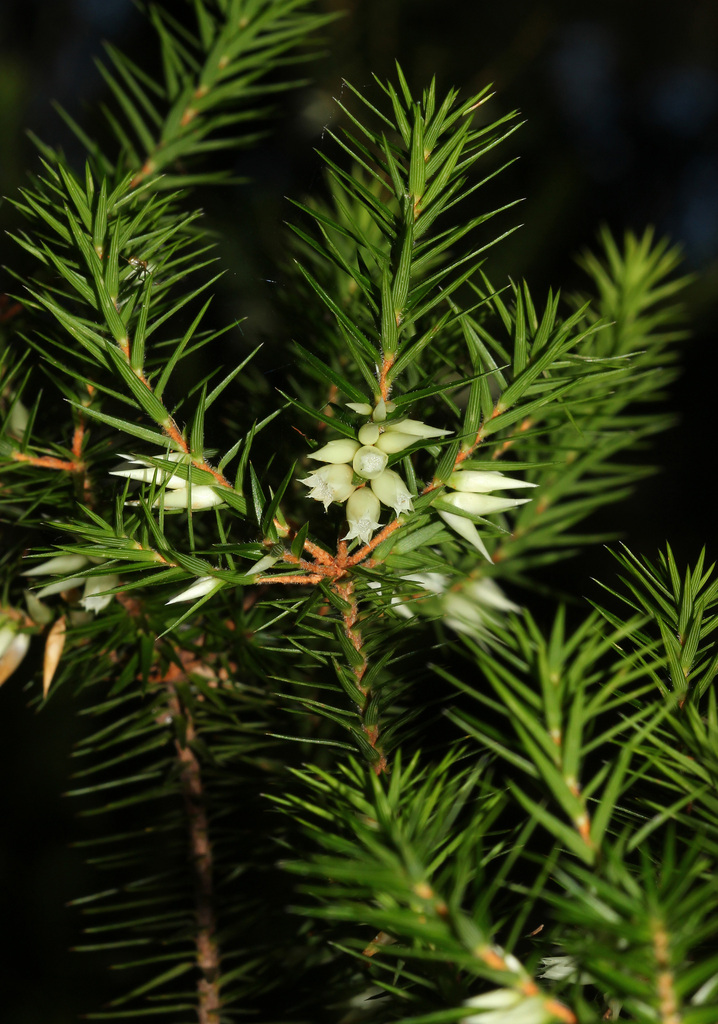

Conservation status
- Critically endangered (EPBC Act)

Scientific classification
- Kingdom: Plantae
- Clade: Tracheophytes
- Clade: Angiosperms
- Clade: Eudicots
- Clade: Asterids
- Order: Ericales
- Family: Ericaceae
- Genus: Melichrus
- Species: M. gibberagee

Binomial name
- Melichrus gibberagee J.B.Williams ex H.T.Kenn. & J.J.Bruhl

Synonyms
- Melichrus sp. Gibberagee (A.S.Benwell & J.B.Williams 97239); Melichrus sp. Gibberagee (Benwell 97239) NSW Herbarium

= Melichrus gibberagee =

Species of flowering plant

Melichrus gibberagee, commonly known as narrow-leaf melichrus, is a species of flowering plant in the family Ericaceae and is endemic to a restricted part of eastern Australia. It is a small shrub with compact, narrow, more or less erect, sharply-pointed leaves, white or yellowish flowers and more or less spherical, red drupes.

== Description ==
Melichrus gibberagee is a small, erect shrub that typically grows to a height of 30–120 cm (12–47 in). Its leaves are more or less glabrous, trowel-shaped or lance-shaped, sharply-pointed, 12.5–19.1 mm (0.49–0.75 in) long and 1.1–2.0 mm (0.043–0.079 in) wide on a petiole 0.5–0.9 mm (0.020–0.035 in) wide, with 9 to 11 obvious, parallel veins. The flowers are arranged singly in leaf axils, with eight to ten overlapping green to cream-coloured bracts up to 3.9–6.7 mm (0.15–0.26 in) long. The five sepals are papery, egg-shaped to lance-shaped, 6.4–8 mm (0.25–0.31 in) long, cream-coloured and translucent. The petals form a narrowly urn-shaped tube 2–3 mm (0.079–0.118 in) long and wide with egg-shaped to lance-shaped lobes 4.0–5.2 mm (0.16–0.20 in) long and 1.7–1.9 mm (0.067–0.075 in) wide. Flowering occurs from March to August, and the fruit is a reddish-brown, elliptic drupe 4.8–5.1 mm (0.19–0.20 in) long and smooth.

== Taxonomy and naming ==
Melichrus gibberagee was first formally described in 2020 by Helen T. Kennedy and Jeremy James Bruhl in the journal Telopea from an unpublished description by John Beaumont Williams. The specific epithet (gibberagee) is a local area name, "likely rooted in the Bundjalung language".

== Distribution and habitat ==
This species of Melichrus grows in tall open forest on gentle slopes in the Gibberagee area, about 50 km (31 mi) south of Casino.

== Conservation status ==
Melichrus gibberagee is listed as "critically endangered" under the Australian Government Environment Protection and Biodiversity Conservation Act 1999, and as "endangered" under the New South Wales Government Biodiversity Conservation Act 2016.
