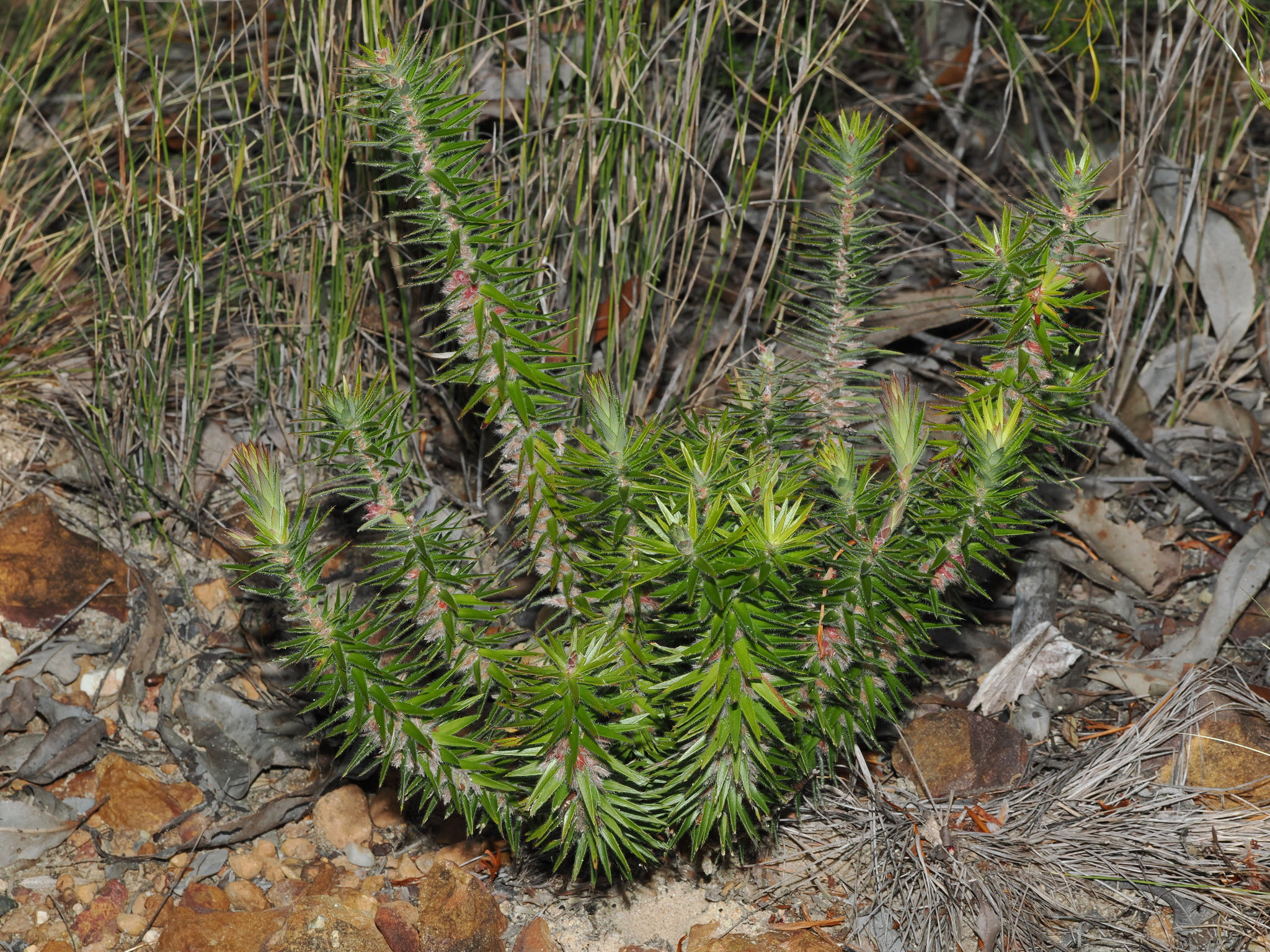

Conservation status
- Endangered (EPBC Act)

Scientific classification
- Kingdom: Plantae
- Clade: Tracheophytes
- Clade: Angiosperms
- Clade: Eudicots
- Clade: Asterids
- Order: Ericales
- Family: Ericaceae
- Genus: Melichrus
- Species: M. hirsutus

Binomial name
- Melichrus hirsutus J.B.Williams ex H.T.Kenn. & I.Telford

= Melichrus hirsutus =

Species of flowering plant

Melichrus hirsutus, commonly known as hairy melichrus, is a species of flowering plant in the family Ericaceae and is endemic to a restricted part of eastern Australia. It is a shrub with many stems at the base, ascending, lance-shaped, hairy, sharply-pointed leaves, pink, tube-shaped flowers and fleshy, spherical, reddish-purple drupes.

== Description ==
Melichrus hirsutus is a shrub with many stems at its base, and that typically grows to a height of 20–70 cm (7.9–27.6 in). Its leaves are ascending, lance-shaped, hairy, sharply-pointed, mostly 16.9–22.5 mm (0.67–0.89 in) long and 2.0–3.5 mm (0.079–0.138 in) wide on a broad, compressed petiole 0.5–1.1 mm (0.020–0.043 in) wide, with 9 to 11 obvious, parallel veins. The flowers are arranged singly in leaf axils, with nine to eleven strongly overlapping green and pinkish bracts up to 4.2–4.9 mm (0.17–0.19 in) long. The five sepals are papery, overlapping, lance-shaped, 6–7 mm (0.24–0.28 in) long, green and pink. The petals are red and pink, form a cup-shaped tube 2.8–3.0 mm (0.11–0.12 in) long and 3.8–4.0 mm (0.15–0.16 in) wide with widely egg-shaped lobes 2.5–2.8 mm (0.098–0.110 in) long and 2.0–2.3 mm (0.079–0.091 in) wide. Flowering occurs from March to August, and the fruit is a fleshy, reddish-purple, spherical drupe 3.8–8 mm (0.15–0.31 in) in diameter.

== Taxonomy and naming ==
Melichrus hirsutus was first formally described in 2020 by Helen T. Kennedy and Ian Telford in the journal Telopea from an unpublished description by John Beaumont Williams. The specific epithet (hirsutus) means covered with fairly coarse and stiff, long, erect, or ascending straight hairs.

== Distribution and habitat ==
This species of Melichrus grows in forest on poor, sandy soils, in three nature reserves, north of Glenreagh in eastern New South Wales.

== Conservation status ==
Melichrus hirsutus is listed as "endangered" under the Australian Government Environment Protection and Biodiversity Conservation Act 1999, and as "endangered" under the New South Wales Government Biodiversity Conservation Act 2016.
