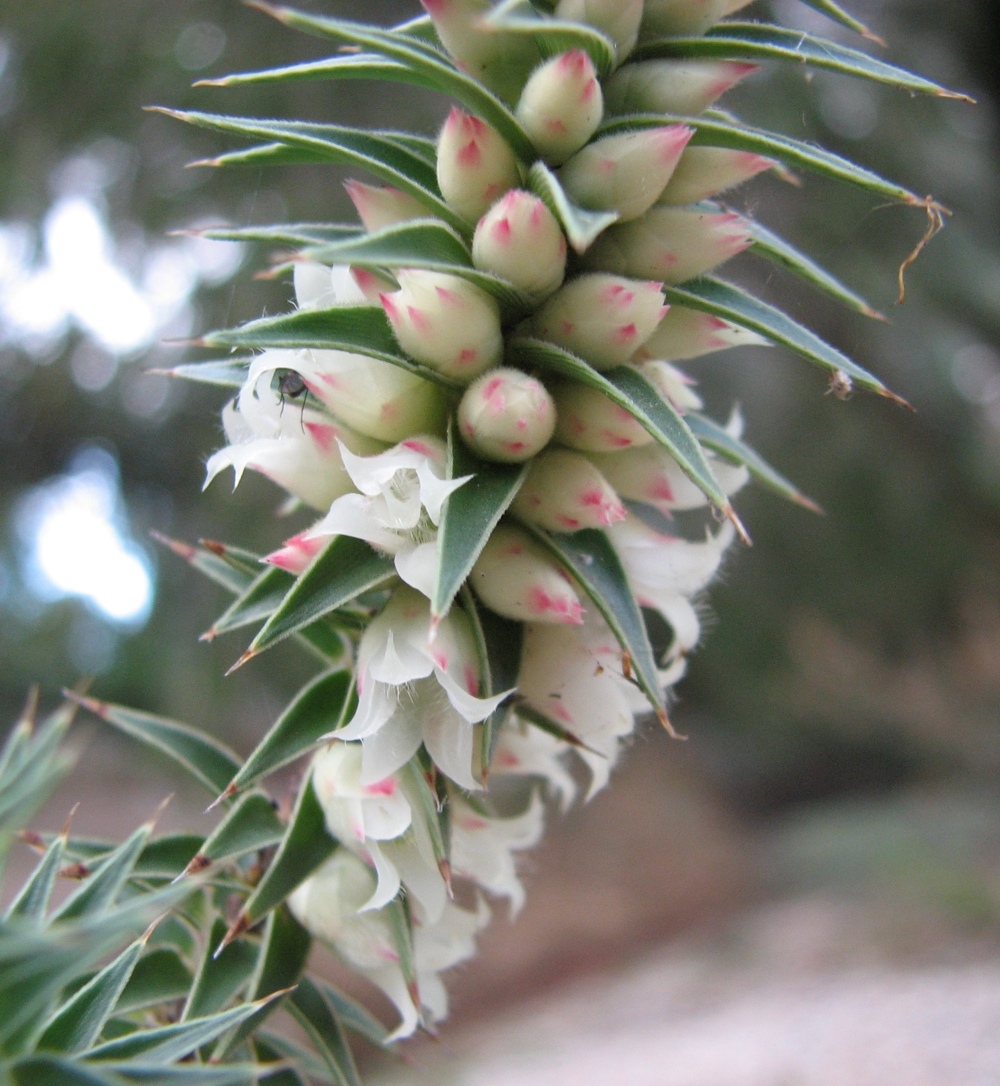
- Melichrus urceolatus

Scientific classification
- Kingdom: Plantae
- Clade: Tracheophytes
- Clade: Angiosperms
- Clade: Eudicots
- Clade: Asterids
- Order: Ericales
- Family: Ericaceae
- Subfamily: Epacridoideae
- Tribe: Styphelieae
- Genus: Melichrus; R.Br.

= Melichrus =

Genus of flowering plants

Melichrus is a genus of flowering plants in the family Ericaceae, and is endemic to eastern Australia. Plants in the genus Melichrus are shrubs with narrowly egg-shaped leaves crowded at the ends of branches and bell-shaped or urn-shaped flowers arranged singly in leaf bases, the fruit a drupe.

== Description ==
Plants in the genus Melichrus are low-lying to erect shrubs with branchlets covered with soft hairs and prominent leaf scars. The leaves are narrowly egg-shaped, more or less sessile and crowded at the ends of branches with parallel striations on the lower surface. The flowers are arranged singly in leaf axils and are more or less sessile, with bracts grading to larger egg-shaped or circular bracteoles. The sepals are egg-shaped with hairy edges and the petals are fleshy and form a bell-shaped or urn-shaped tube, with 5 tufts of glandular hairs near the base, the lobes egg-shaped and hairy. The ovary has four to six locules with one ovule per locule and the fruit is a drupe with a slightly mesocarp and a hard endocarp.

== Taxonomy ==
The genus Melichrus was first formally described in 1810 by Robert Brown in his Prodromus Florae Novae Hollandiae et Insulae Van Diemen. The genus name (Melichrus) means "honey-coloured", but the reason for the name was not explained by Brown.

=== Species list ===
The following species are accepted by the Australian Plant Census as at November 2024:

- Melichrus adpressus A.Cunn. ex DC. - large nectar-heath (Qld., N.S.W.)
- Melichrus erubescens A.Cunn. ex DC. - ruby urn-heath (Qld., N.S.W.)
- Melichrus gibberagee J.B.Williams ex H.T.Kenn. & J.J.Bruhl – narrow-leaf melichrus (N.S.W.)
- Melichrus hirsutus J.B.Williams ex H.T.Kenn. & I.Telford – hairy melichrus (N.S.W.)
- Melichrus procumbens (Cav.) Druce - jam tarts (N.S.W., Qld.)
- Melichrus urceolatus R.Br. (Qld, N.S.W., A.C.T., Vic.)

The following specimen names are accepted by the Australian Plant Census, but the species have not been formally described, as at November 2024:

- Melichrus sp. Bruce Rock (J.Buegge D36) WA Herbarium
- Melichrus sp. Bungalbin Hill (F.H. & M.P.Mollemans 3069) WA Herbarium
- Melichrus sp. Coolgardie (K.R.Newbey 8698) WA Herbarium
- Melichrus sp. Inglewood (A.R.Bean 1652) Qld Herbarium
- Melichrus sp. Isla Gorge (P.Sharpe+ 601) Qld Herbarium
- Melichrus sp. Tara (D.Halford Q2259) Qld Herbarium
