= Gentiana wingecarribiensis var. wissmannii =

Scientific classification
- Kingdom: Plantae
- Clade: Tracheophytes
- Clade: Angiosperms
- Clade: Eudicots
- Clade: Asterids
- Order: Gentianales
- Family: Gentianaceae
- Genus: Gentiana
- Species: G. wingecarribiensis
- Variety: G. w. var. wissmannii

Trinomial name
- Gentiana wingecarribiensis var. wissmannii (J.B.Williams) Halda

Synonyms
- Gentiana wissmannii J.B.Williams

Species of plant

Gentiana wingecarribiensis var. wissmannii, commonly known as New England gentian, is a variety of flowering plant in the family Gentianaceae that is endemic to New South Wales, Australia. It is a small, upright annual herb with blue flowers.

== Description ==
Gentiana wingecarribiensis var. wissmannii is an upright, smooth, annual herb, 3–8 cm (1.2–3.1 in) high with simple or with 2-4 short, slender branches. The stem leaves are in pairs of 3-10, sessile, ovate to oblong-ovate, wider toward the stem, 4–10 mm (0.16–0.39 in) long, rough on the margins and sharp or rounded at the apex. The flowers are in clusters of 1-8, bell-shaped, slender, blue inside, greenish externally, tube 6–12 mm (0.24–0.47 in) long, lobes spreading 2–2.5 mm (0.079–0.098 in) long, translucent, jagged or pleated, and pointed or tapering to a point. The 4 or 5 sepals and petals are 8–15 mm (0.31–0.59 in) long, calyx lobes are lance to oblong-egg-shaped, 3–4 mm (0.12–0.16 in) long, pointed and faintly veined. Flowering occurs from September to November and the fruit is an egg-shaped capsule 5–6 mm (0.20–0.24 in) long.

== Taxonomy and naming ==
Gentiana wingecarribiensis var. wissmannii was first formally described as a separate species in 1988 by John Beaumont Williams. The specific epithet (wissmannii) is in honour of Hans Wissmann. Currently, it is classified as a variety of Gentiana wingecarribiensis.

== Distribution and habitat ==
This variety has a restricted distribution, growing on the edges of swamps near Ebor in New South Wales.

== Conservation status ==
Gentiana wingecarribiensis var. wissmannii is classified as "vulnerable" under the New South Wales Environment Protection and Biodiversity Conservation Act.
