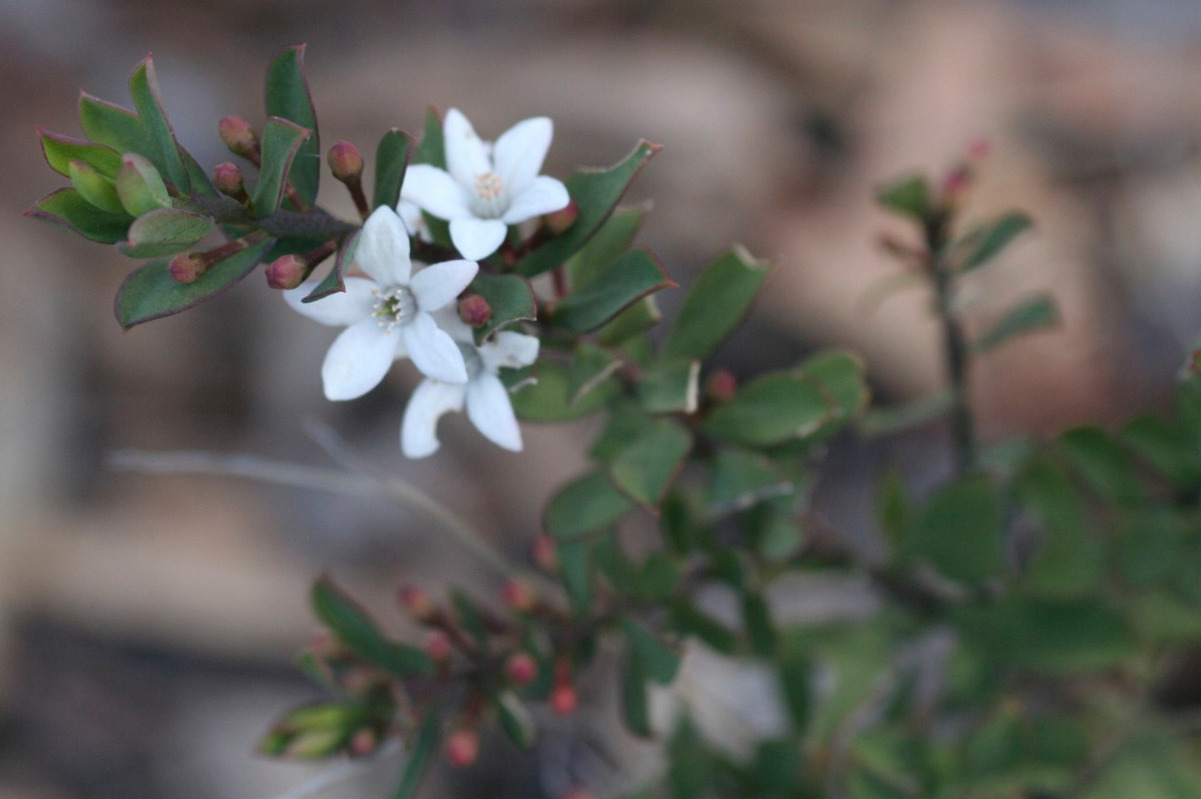
- In Girraween National Park

Scientific classification
- Kingdom: Plantae
- Clade: Embryophytes
- Clade: Tracheophytes
- Clade: Angiosperms
- Clade: Eudicots
- Clade: Rosids
- Order: Sapindales
- Family: Rutaceae
- Genus: Philotheca
- Species: P. epilosa

Binomial name
- Philotheca epilosa (Paul G.Wilson) P.I.Forst.

Synonyms
- Eriostemon myoporoides subsp. epilosus Paul G.Wilson; Philotheca myoporoides subsp. epilosa (Paul G.Wilson) Bayly

= Philotheca epilosa =

Species of plant

Philotheca epilosa is a species of flowering plant in the family Rutaceae and is endemic to eastern Australia. It is a shrub with egg-shaped to lance-shaped leaves with the narrower end toward the base and crowded near the ends of the glandular-warty branchlets, and white flowers usually arranged singly on the ends of the branchlets.

== Description ==
Philotheca epilosa is a shrub that grows to a height of about 1 m (3 ft 3 in) and has glandular-warty branchlets. The leaves are more or less clustered near the ends of the branchlets and are glandular-warty, egg-shaped to lance-shaped with the narrower end towards the base and a pronounced point on the tip, 4–30 mm (0.16–1.18 in) long and 2–10 mm (0.079–0.394 in) wide. The flowers are usually arranged singly on the ends of the branchlets on a peduncle 1–3 mm (0.039–0.118 in) long, each flower on a pedicel 2–5 mm (0.079–0.197 in) long. There are round sepals about 1 mm (0.039 in) long with a fleshy centre, five oblong white petals about 5–8 mm (0.20–0.31 in) long and 2–3.5 mm (0.079–0.138 in) wide and ten hairy stamens. Flowering occurs from August to September and the fruit is 5–7 mm (0.20–0.28 in) long and prominently beaked.

== Taxonomy and naming ==
This species was first formally described in 1970 by Paul G. Wilson who gave it the name Eriostemon myoporoides subsp. epilosus and published the description in the journal Nuytsia, from specimens collected by S.L. Boorman near Wallangarra in 1906. In 2005 Paul Irwin Forster raised the subspecies to species status as Philotheca epilosa in the journal Austrobaileya.

== Distribution and habitat ==
Philotheca epilosa grows in heath and forest among granite boulders north from Deepwater and Torrington in northern New South Wales and near Stanthorpe in south-eastern Queensland.
