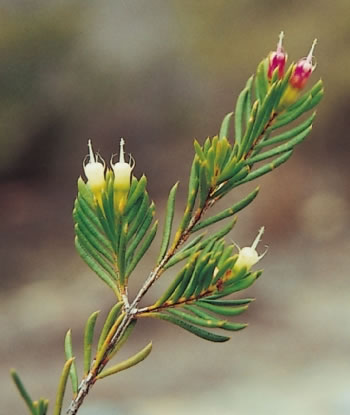

Scientific classification
- Kingdom: Plantae
- Clade: Tracheophytes
- Clade: Angiosperms
- Clade: Eudicots
- Clade: Rosids
- Order: Myrtales
- Family: Myrtaceae
- Genus: Homoranthus
- Species: H. croftianus

Binomial name
- Homoranthus croftianus J.T.Hunter
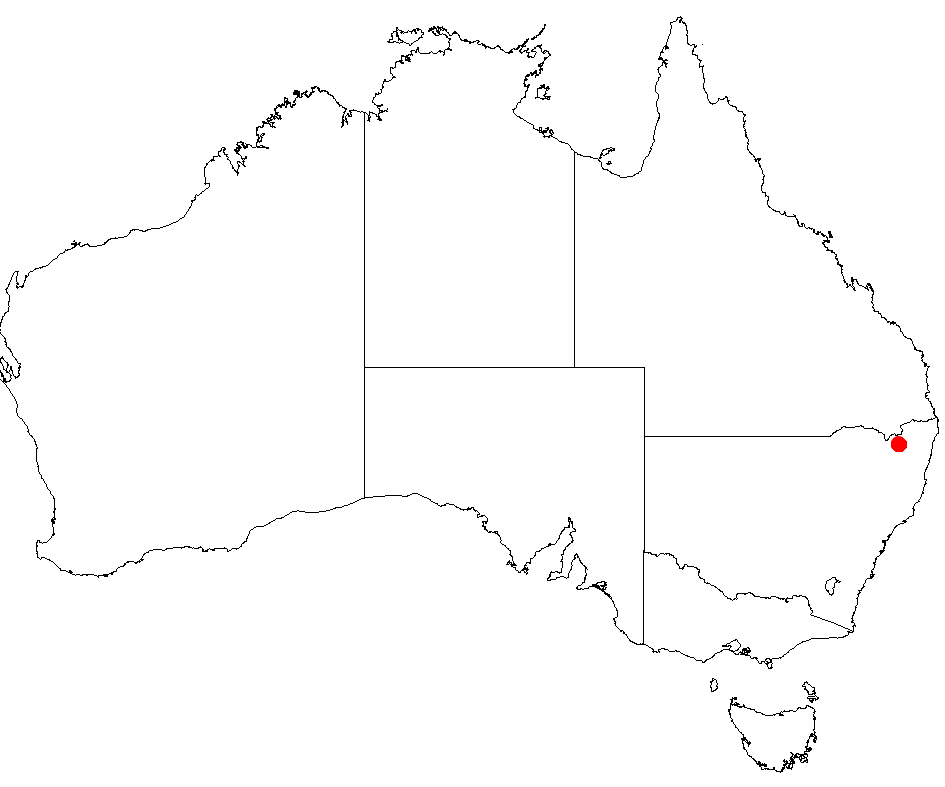
- Occurrence data from AVH

= Homoranthus croftianus =

Bolivia homoranthus

Species of flowering plant

Homoranthus croftianus, commonly known as Bolivia homoranthus, is a plant in the myrtle family Myrtaceae and is endemic to a small area near Bolivia in northern New South Wales. It is an upright shrub with pointed leaves arranged in alternating opposite pairs so they form four rows along the branchlets. Single greenish to cream-coloured flowers are borne in leaf axils.

== Description ==
Flowers and fruits sporadically throughout the year, primarily in October-January.

== Taxonomy and naming ==
Homoranthus croftianus was first formally described in 1998 by John Hunter from a specimen collected in the Bolivia Range. The description was published in Telopea. The specific epithet (croftianus) honours Peter Croft, a National Parks and Wildlife Service ranger.

== Distribution and habitat ==
Endemic to Bolivia Hill Nature Reserve, 40km southerly direction from Tenterfield New South Wales. It grows on shallow sandy soils in heath and shrubby woodland on or adjacent to granite outcrops.

== Conservation status ==
Highly restricted distribution. A ROTAP conservation code of 2VCit appropriate using Briggs and Leigh (1996) criteria. IUCN (2010) considered vulnerable.
