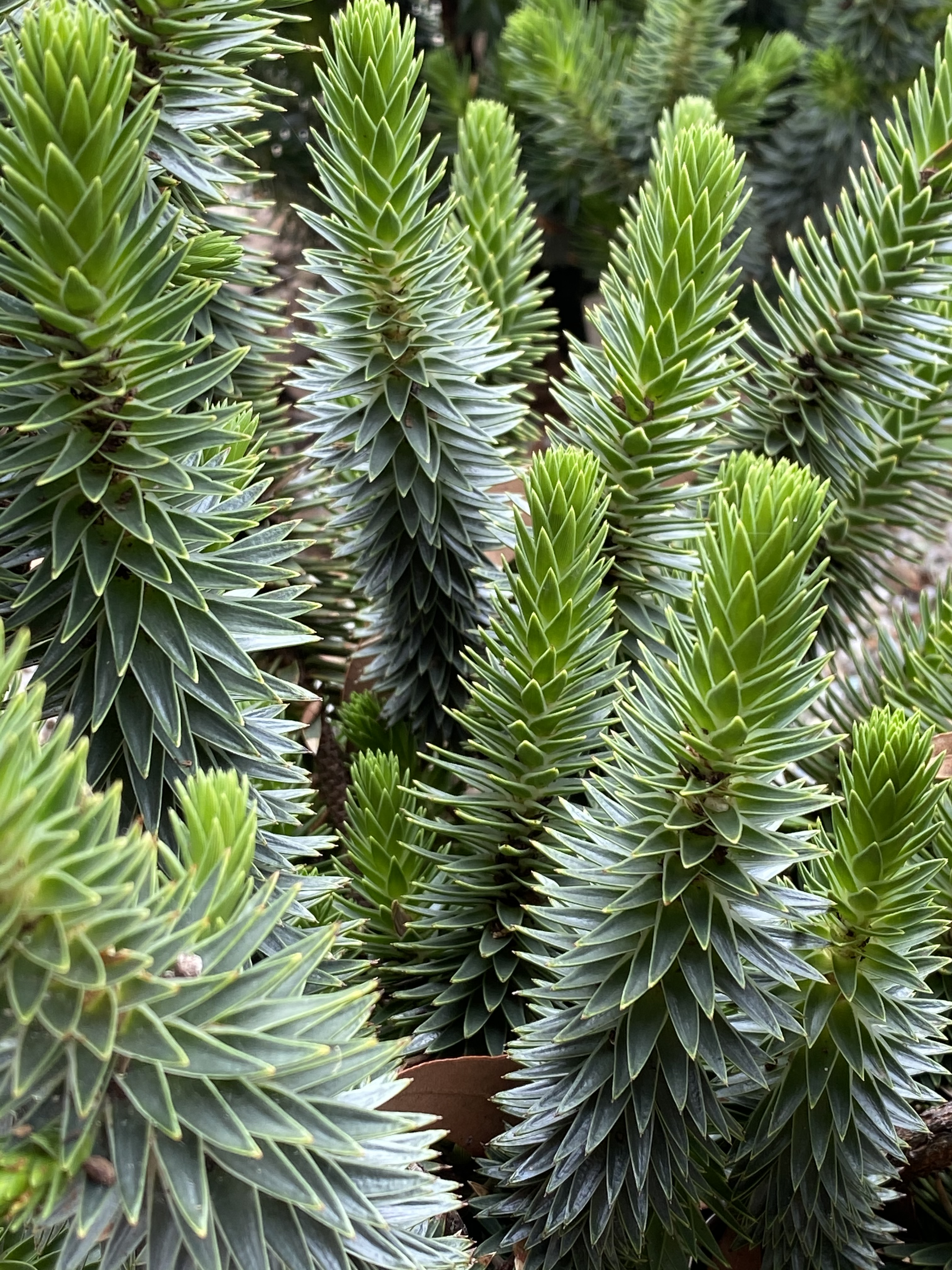
- Melichrus adpressus

Scientific classification
- Kingdom: Plantae
- Clade: Tracheophytes
- Clade: Angiosperms
- Clade: Eudicots
- Clade: Asterids
- Order: Ericales
- Family: Ericaceae
- Genus: Melichrus
- Species: M. adpressus

Binomial name
- Melichrus adpressus A.Cunn. ex DC.

= Melichrus adpressus =

Large nectar-heath

Species of flowering plant

Melichrus adpressus, commonly known as large nectar-heath, is a flowering plant in the family Ericaceae. It is an upright small shrub with whitish-green flowers.

== Description ==
Melichrus adpressus is an upright shrub 30–150 cm (12–59 in) high with upwardly, over-lapping, appressed leaves over most of the branch, occasionally toward the base. The leaves are smooth, 15–32 mm (0.59–1.26 in) long, 2.5–5.6 mm (0.098–0.220 in) wide, ribbed on the lower surface, sometimes reddish coloured at the base, margins translucent near the petiole. The cream or yellowish-green flowers are more or less hidden amongst the leaves, corolla more or less cylindrical, 3.8–4 mm (0.15–0.16 in) long, lobes upright, occasional hairs and 2.6–2.8 mm (0.10–0.11 in) long. Flowering occurs from July to September and the fruit is more or less spherical-shaped, about 4 mm (0.16 in) long, green, finely ribbed underneath and smooth at the end.

== Taxonomy and naming ==
Melichrus adpressus was first formally described in 1839 by Augustin Pyramus de Candolle from an unpublished description by Allan Cunningham and the description was published in Prodromus Systematis Naturalis Regni Vegetabilis.

== Distribution and habitat ==
Large nectar-heath grows in heath, sandy soils and coastal scrub north of Angourie Point in New South Wales and in Queensland.
