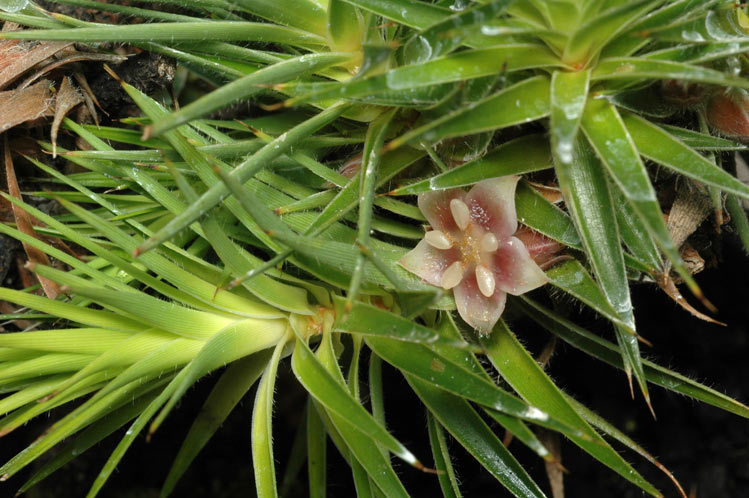
- In the ANBG

Scientific classification
- Kingdom: Plantae
- Clade: Tracheophytes
- Clade: Angiosperms
- Clade: Eudicots
- Clade: Asterids
- Order: Ericales
- Family: Ericaceae
- Genus: Melichrus
- Species: M. procumbens

Binomial name
- Melichrus procumbens (Cav.) Druce

= Melichrus procumbens =

Jam tarts

Species of flowering plant

Melichrus procumbens, commonly known as jam tarts, is a flowering plant in the family Ericaceae and is endemic to eastern Australia. It is a low-lying shrub, often forming mats, with hairy, lance-shaped leaves, fragrant, cream-coloured flowers and flattened spherical, green to red drupes.

== Description ==
Melichrus procumbens is a low-lying shrub that sometimes forms mats or grows to a height of 20 cm (8 in). Its leaves are erect or pressed against the stem near the ends of branches or spreading lower down, 11–28 mm (0.43–1.10 in) long and 1.2–4.0 mm (0.05–0.16 in) wide on a petiole 0.5 mm (0.02 in) wide, with 10 to 14 ribs on the lower surface. The flowers are borne on the underside of branches, cream-coloured to pale green with a pink tinge. The bracteoles are 3.0–5.5 mm (0.12–0.22 in) long and the sepals are 5.0–7.5 mm (0.2–0.3 in) long and greenish with silky hairs. The petals form a saucer-shaped tube 2.0–2.5 mm (0.08–0.10 in) long with spreading lobes 3.0–3.5 mm (0.12–0.14 in) long. Flowering occurs from February to July to September, and the fruit is a green to red, smooth, flattened spherical drupe 2–4 mm (0.08–0.16 in) long .

== Taxonomy and naming ==
This species was first formally described in 1797 by Antonio José Cavanilles who gave it the name Ventenatia procumbens in his Icones et Descriptiones Plantarum from specimens collected at Port Jackson. In 1917, George Claridge Druce transferred the species to Melichrus as M. procumbens in a supplement to The Botanical Exchange Club and Society of the British Isles Report for 1916.

== Distribution and habitat ==
Jam tarts grows in heath and forest on sandstone or granite from south-eastern Queensland to the coast and Hornsby Plateau near Sydney.

== Ecology ==
The flowers of Melichrus procumbens face downwards, close to the ground, suggesting pollination by ground-crawling insects such as ants. The common name (jam tarts) comes from the peculiar shape of the open flower and the large amount of nectar present.

== Conservation status ==
Melichrus procumbens is listed as of Least Concern under the Queensland Government Nature Conservation Act 1992.
