= Gentiana wingecarribiensis =

Scientific classification
- Kingdom: Plantae
- Clade: Tracheophytes
- Clade: Angiosperms
- Clade: Eudicots
- Clade: Asterids
- Order: Gentianales
- Family: Gentianaceae
- Genus: Gentiana
- Species: G. wingecarribiensis

Binomial name
- Gentiana wingecarribiensis L.G.Adams

Species of plant

Gentiana wingecarribiensis is a flowering plant in the family Gentianaceae and is endemic to New South Wales. It is a small, upright or decumbent annual herb with blue to mauve flowers.

== Description ==
Gentiana wingecarribiensis is a small, smooth, upright or decumbent annual herb, 2.5–12 cm (0.98–4.72 in) high, and is quick growing but short-lived. The stems may be simple or sparingly branched, occasionally up to nine branches each with a single flower, upper surface finely rough, lower surface often with a red or purple tinge. The dark green leaves are cauline in opposite pairs of 4-7, wide to oblong egg-shaped, 2–9 mm (0.079–0.354 in) long and 2.5–6 mm (0.098–0.236 in) wide. The flowers are borne singly at the end of branches, between 1 and 9 on each plant. The corolla is narrowly bell-shaped, 10–17 mm (0.39–0.67 in) long, about 4–11 mm (0.16–0.43 in) in diameter, blue on the interior, ribbed and greenish on outer surface. The flowers open in response to sunshine and warm temperatures. Flowering occurs mainly from September to November and the fruit is an upright capsule, egg-shaped, 4–6 mm (0.16–0.24 in) long, flared at the apex and contains several hundred light brown seeds.

== Taxonomy and naming ==
Gentiana wingecarribiensis was first formally described in 1988 by Laurence George Adams and the description was published in Telopea. The specific epithet (wingecarribiensis) is in reference to the swamp where it was originally found.

=== Infraspecies ===
The following varieties are recognised:

- G. w. var. wingecarribiensis L.G.Adams
- G. w. var. wissmannii (J.B.Williams) Halda - New England gentian

== Distribution and habitat ==
This gentiana is only known from two locations in the Southern Highlands of New South Wales, it grows in peatland swamps, grasslands and swamp margins.

== Conservation status ==
Gentiana wingecarribiensis is classified as "critically endangered" under the New South Wales Environment Protection and Biodiversity Conservation Act.
