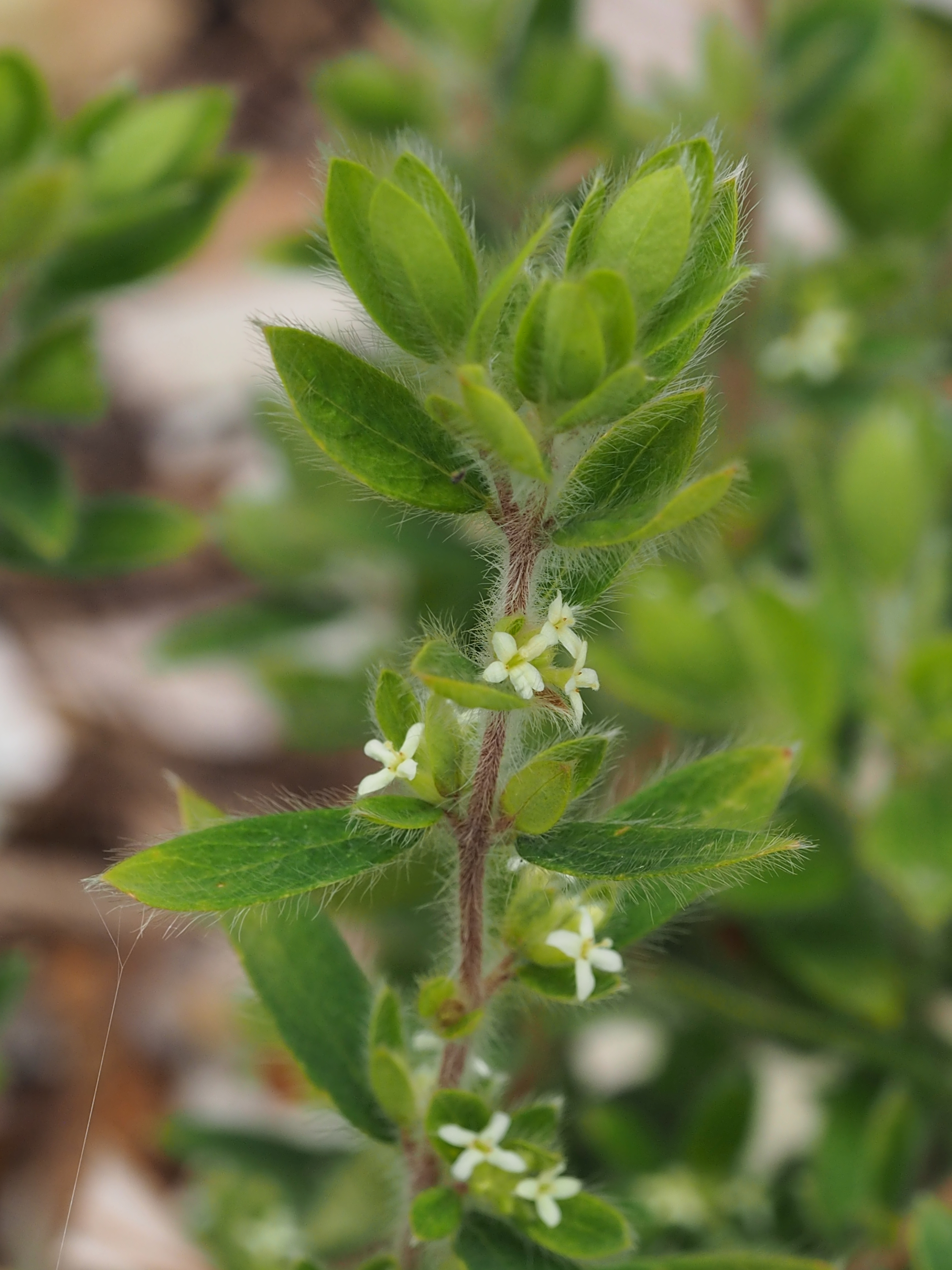
- Cultivated specimen

Conservation status
- Endangered (EPBC Act)

Scientific classification
- Kingdom: Plantae
- Clade: Tracheophytes
- Clade: Angiosperms
- Clade: Eudicots
- Clade: Rosids
- Order: Malvales
- Family: Thymelaeaceae
- Genus: Pimelea
- Species: P. venosa

Binomial name
- Pimelea venosa Threlfall

= Pimelea venosa =

Bolivia Hill rice-flower

Species of plant

Pimelea venosa, commonly known as Bolivia Hill rice-flower, is a flowering plant in the family Thymelaeaceae and is endemic to a restricted area of New South Wales. It is an erect shrub with densely long-hairy stems and leaves, elliptic to lance-shaped leaves and small groups of white flowers.

== Description ==
Pimelea venosa is an erect shrub that typically grows to a height of 1.5 m (4 ft 11 in) with its stems and leaves densely covered with long, soft, whitish hairs. The leaves are elliptic to lance-shaped with the narrower end towards the base, 10–15 mm (0.39–0.59 in) long and 4–6 mm (0.16–0.24 in) wide. The flowers are bisexual, white, arranged in groups of three to six with between two and six small, leaf-like bracts at the base. The fruit is oval, green and about 4 mm (0.16 in) long.

== Taxonomy and naming ==
Pimelea venosa was first formally described in 1983 by S. Threlfall in the journal Brunonia, from a specimen collected by Ernst Betche near Bolivia in 1886.

== Distribution and habitat ==
Bolivia Hill rice-flower is only known from near Bolivia on the Northern Tablelands of New South Wales but was previously recorded near Tenterfield and 100 km (62 mi) east of this region. Surveys in 1999 and after a bushfire in 2012 found no plants in known sites but after a low intensity fire in late 2019, about 200 seedlings were found.

== Conservation status ==
This rice-flower is listed as "endangered" under the Australian Government Environment Protection and Biodiversity Conservation Act 1999. The main threats to the species include habitat disturbance, browsing by feral goats, inappropriate fire regimes and its restricted distribution.
