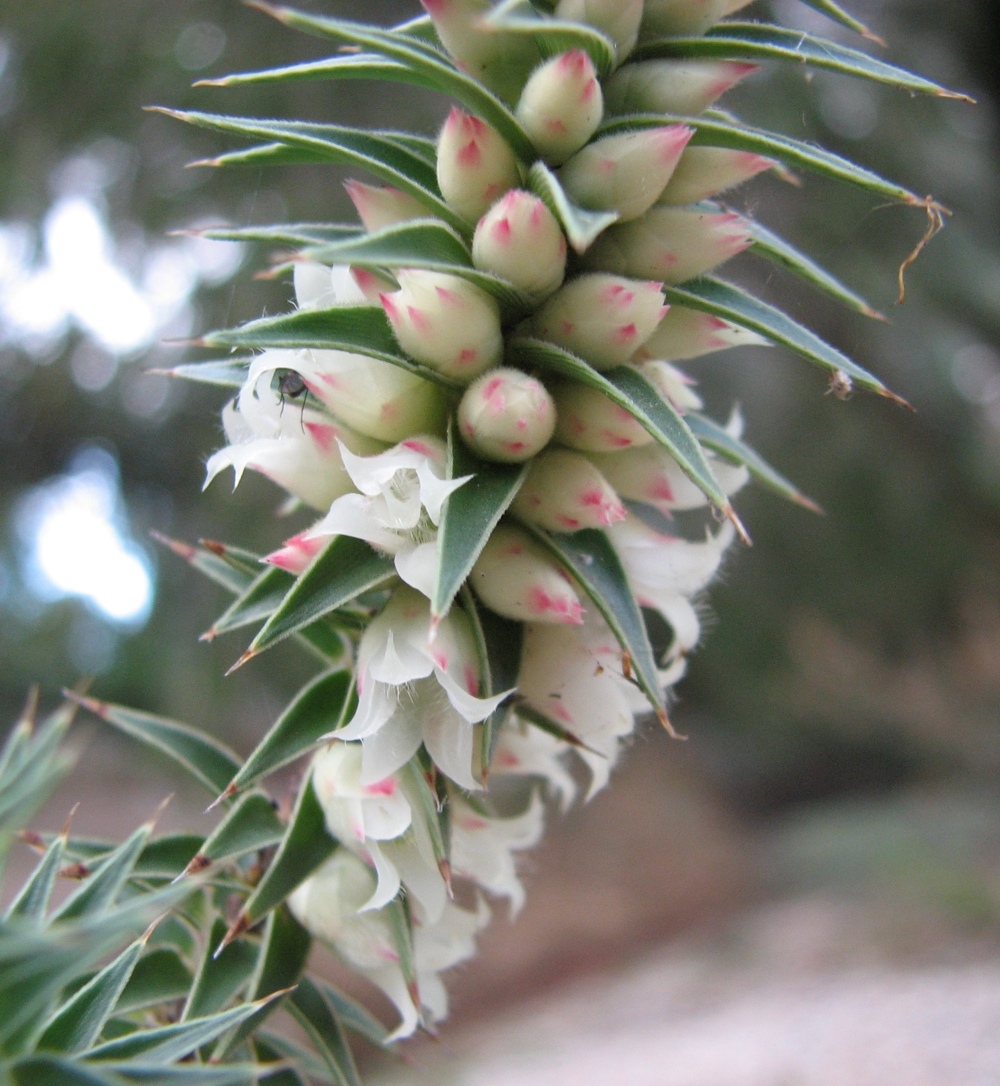
- In Maranoa Gardens

Scientific classification
- Kingdom: Plantae
- Clade: Tracheophytes
- Clade: Angiosperms
- Clade: Eudicots
- Clade: Asterids
- Order: Ericales
- Family: Ericaceae
- Genus: Melichrus
- Species: M. urceolatus

Binomial name
- Melichrus urceolatus R.Br.

Synonyms
- Melichrus medius A.Cunn.; Styphelia urceolata (R.Br.) F.Muell.

= Melichrus urceolatus =

Species of flowering plant

Melichrus urceolatus, commonly known as urn heath, honey gorse or cream urn-heath, is a species of flowering plant in the family Ericaceae and is endemic to eastern Australia. It is an erect shrub with narrowly lance-shaped leaves with deep grooves on the lower surface, white, cream-coloured or yellowish-green flowers, sometimes with a red or rose-pink tinge, and spherical greenish-white or purplish-brown fruit.

== Description ==
Melichrus urceolatus is an erect, stiffly-branched shrub that typically grows to a height of 0.2–1.5 m (7.9 in – 4 ft 11.1 in), forms a lignotuber and has branchlets with soft hairs. The leaves are narrowly lance-shaped, 8–25 mm (0.31–0.98 in) long and 1.5–4.2 mm (0.059–0.165 in) wide, with a prominent mid-vein and deep grooves on the lower surface. The flowers are more or less sessile or on a short peduncle with five to eight egg-shaped bracts, and bracteoles 2.5–4.0 mm (0.098–0.157 in) long. The sepals are egg-shaped to elliptic, 4.5–6 mm (0.18–0.24 in) long and the petals are usually cream-coloured or yellowish-green flowers, sometimes with a red or rose-pink tinge, forming a tube 2.0–3.5 mm (0.079–0.138 in) long with slightly hairy lobes 3–4 mm (0.12–0.16 in) long. It flowers from March to November and the fruit is a flattened spherical, greenish-white or purplish-brown drupe about 4 mm (0.16 in) long.

== Taxonomy ==
Melichrus urceolatus was first formally described in 1810 by botanist Robert Brown in his Prodromus Florae Novae Hollandiae. The specific epithet (urceolatus) means 'urn-shaped'.

== Distribution and habitat ==
This species of Melichrus is found in Queensland, New South Wales and Victoria, where it grows in forest, woodland and mallee scrub. In Queensland it is found along the coast and inland to north of Cairns, it is widespread in the eastern half of New South Wales, and in Victoria it occurs mainly north of the Great Dividing Range.
