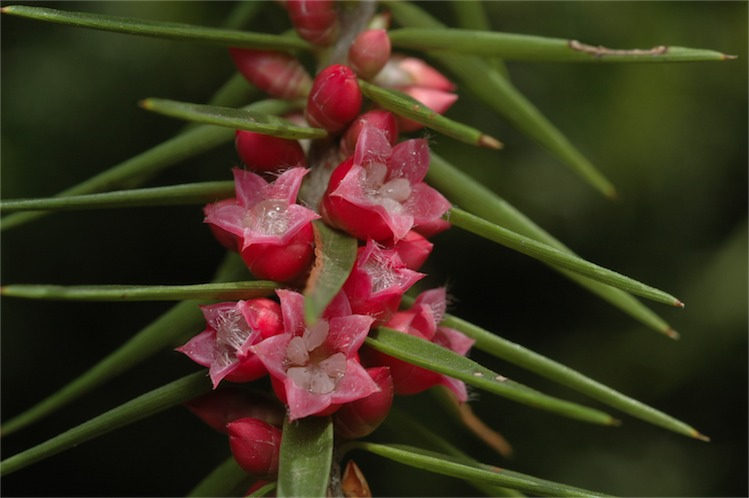

Scientific classification
- Kingdom: Plantae
- Clade: Tracheophytes
- Clade: Angiosperms
- Clade: Eudicots
- Clade: Asterids
- Order: Ericales
- Family: Ericaceae
- Genus: Melichrus
- Species: M. erubescens

Binomial name
- Melichrus erubescens A.Cunn. ex DC.

= Melichrus erubescens =

Ruby urn-heath

Species of flowering plant

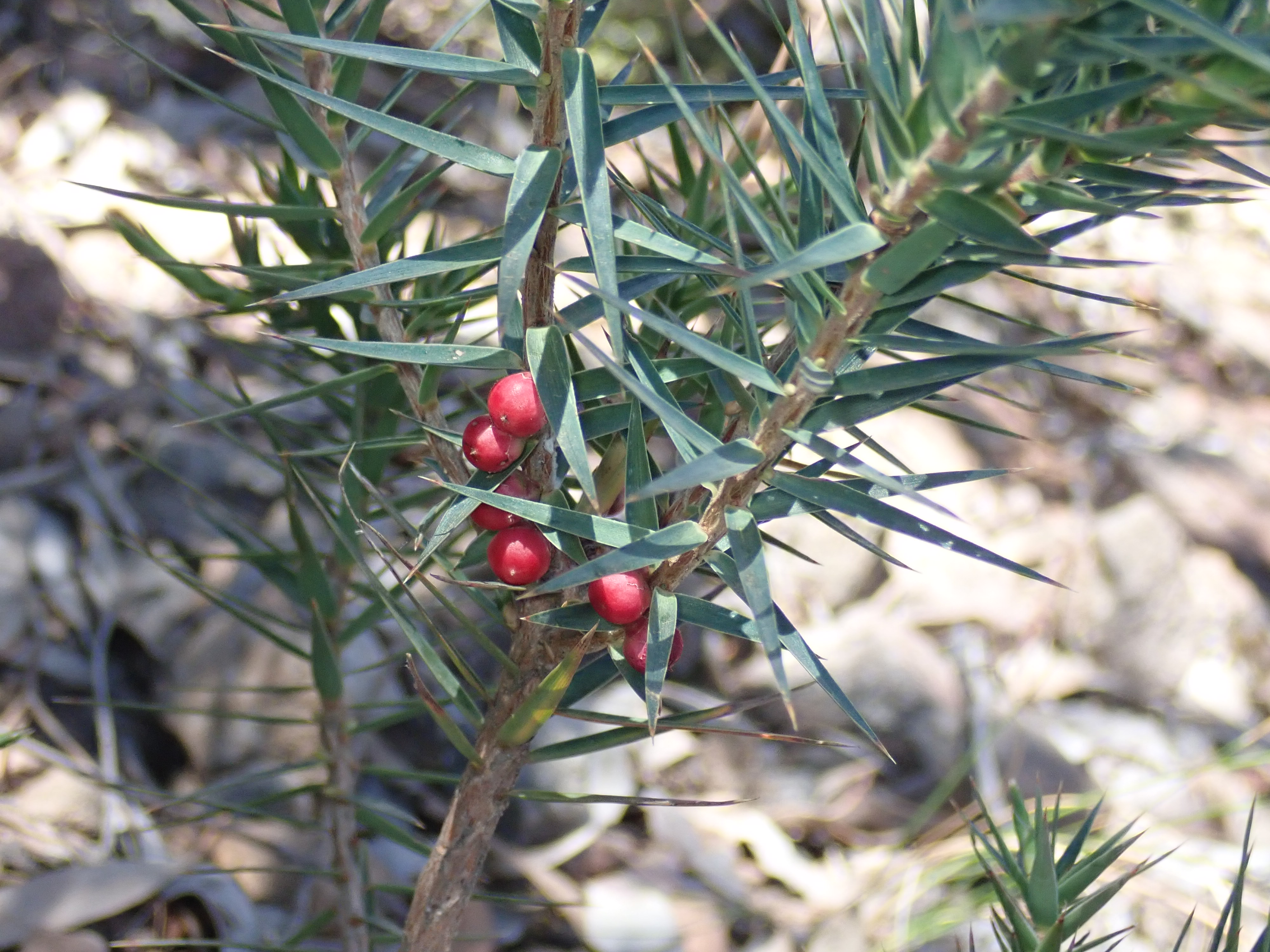
Fruit in Warrumbungle National Park

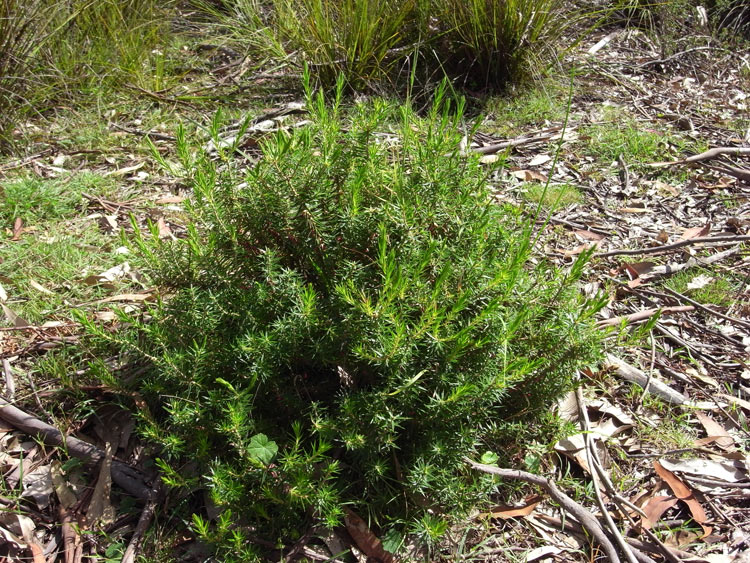
Habit in Goobang National Park

Melichrus erubescens, commonly known as ruby urn-heath, is a flowering plant in the family Ericaceae and is endemic to eastern Australia. It is a slender to compact, bushy shrub with mainly erect, glabrous leaves, pink to deep red flowers and more or less spherical, red drupes.

== Description ==
Melichrus erubescens is a slender to compact, bushy shrub that typically grows to a height of 30–120 cm (12–47 in). Its leaves are more or less erect, glabrous, 11–30 mm (0.43–1.18 in) long and 1.4–4.2 mm (0.055–0.165 in) wide on a petiole 0.8–1.7 mm (0.031–0.067 in) wide, with 8 to 16 deep ribs on the lower surface. The flowers are more or less hidden amongst the leaves, pink to deep red with bracteoles 3–4 mm (0.12–0.16 in) long. The sepals are 3.8–4.5 mm (0.15–0.18 in) long and reddish and the petals form a cup-shaped tube 2.5–3.8 mm (0.098–0.150 in) long with spreading lobes 1.5–2.2 mm (0.059–0.087 in) long. Flowering occurs from February to October, but mainly in September, and the fruit is a red, more or less spherical drupe 4–5 mm (0.16–0.20 in) long and finely ribbed.

== Taxonomy and naming ==
Melichrus erubescens was first formally described in 1839 by Augustin Pyramus de Candolle in his in Prodromus Systematis Naturalis Regni Vegetabilis from an unpublished description by Allan Cunningham.

== Distribution and habitat ==
Ruby urn-heath grows in forest, woodland and scrub on ridge tops and rocky outcrops between the Warrumbungle National Park Grenfell and Cowra in New South Wales and in south-eastern Queensland.

== Conservation status ==
Melichrus erubescens is listed as of "least concern" under the Queensland Government Nature Conservation Act 1992.
