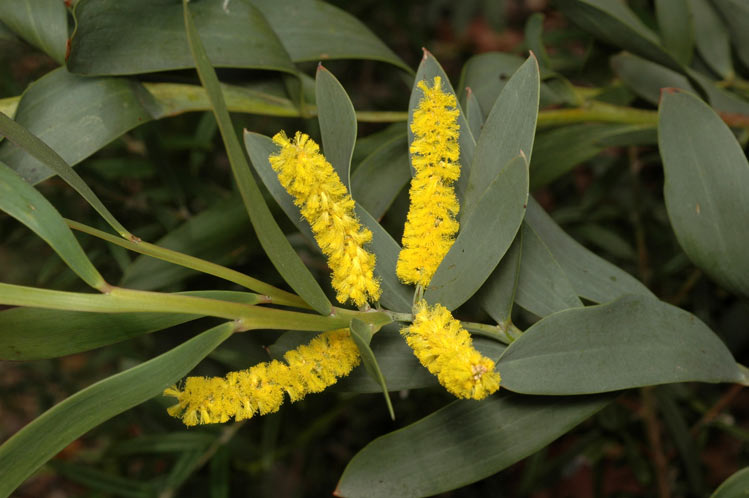

Scientific classification
- Kingdom: Plantae
- Clade: Embryophytes
- Clade: Tracheophytes
- Clade: Spermatophytes
- Clade: Angiosperms
- Clade: Eudicots
- Clade: Rosids
- Order: Fabales
- Family: Fabaceae
- Subfamily: Caesalpinioideae
- Clade: Mimosoid clade
- Genus: Acacia
- Species: A. pycnostachya

Binomial name
- Acacia pycnostachya F.Muell. ex. Benth.
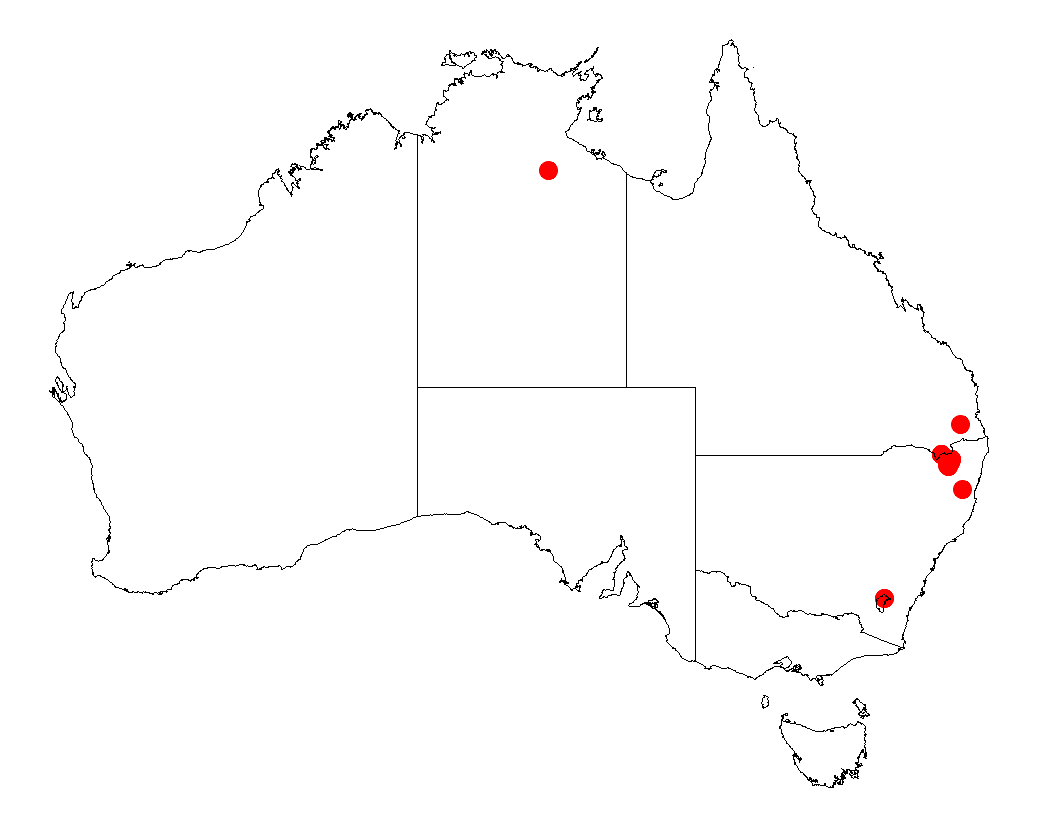
- Occurrence data from AVH

= Acacia pycnostachya =

Bolivia wattle

Species of legume

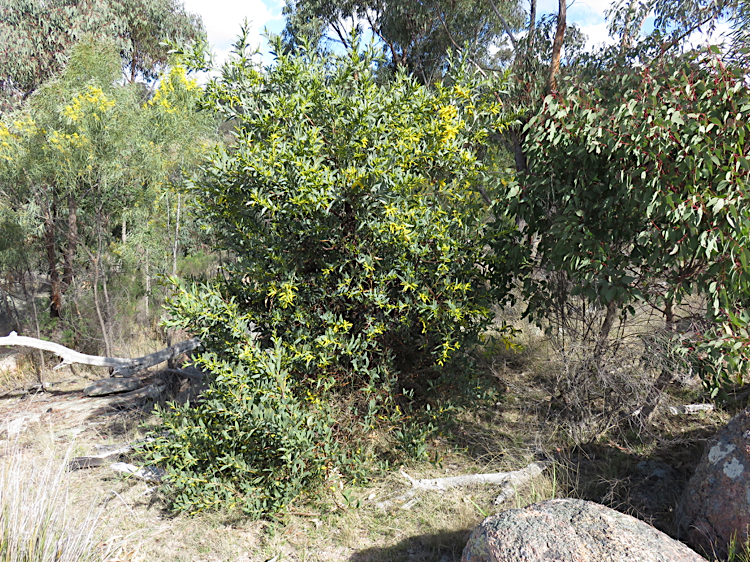
On Bolivia Hill

Acacia pycnostachya, also known as Bolivia wattle, is a shrub or tree belonging to the genus Acacia and the subgenus Juliflorae that is native to eastern Australia.

== Description ==
The shrub or tree typically grows to a maximum height of 7 m (23 ft) and is usually covered with a fine white powder. The coarse and flattened branchlets are 3.5 to 11 mm (0.14 to 0.43 in) in width and have a purplish, brown-orange or tan colour and covered with a fine white powder. Like most species of Acacia it has phyllodes rather than true leaves. The glabrous, rigid and coriaceous phyllodes have a narrowly lanceolate-elliptic to ovate-elliptic shape with a length of 6 to 11.5 cm (2.4 to 4.5 in) and a width of 10 to 27 mm (0.39 to 1.06 in) and have three nerves that are more prominent than the rest. It blooms between August and October producing golden flowers. The subsessile flower-spikes are 2.5 to 7.5 cm (0.98 to 2.95 in) in length that are densely packed with dark yellow flowers. The seed pods that form after flowering have linear shape and are constricted between the seeds with a length of 8 to 12 cm (3.1 to 4.7 in) and a width of 2 to 4.5 mm (0.079 to 0.177 in). The pods are wrinkled longitudinally with pale coloured margins. The black seeds inside are arranged longitudinally inside the pods and have an oblong-elliptic shape with a length of 4 to 6 mm (0.16 to 0.24 in).

== Distribution ==
It is endemic to the north eastern corner of New South Wales in the Bolivia Range in the northern tablelands on the border with Queensland where it is found on granite slopes amongst boulders growing in sandy soil as a part of dry heath and Eucalyptus and Callitris woodland communities.

== See also ==
- List of Acacia species
