= Deepwater railway station =

Former railway station in New South Wales, Australia

Deepwater
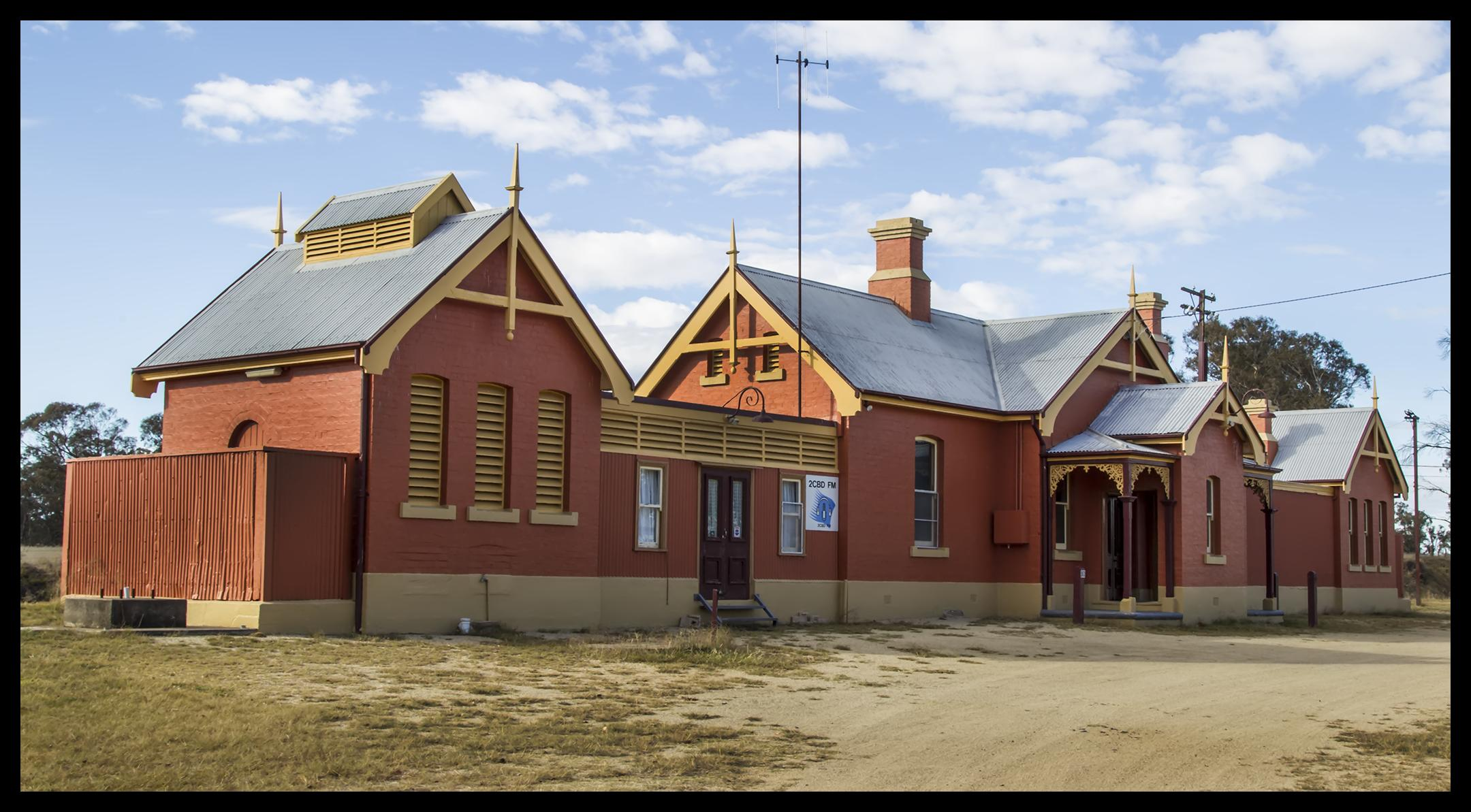
- The disused station buildings from the entrance in May 2014

General information
- Location: Gough Street, Deepwater; New South Wales; Australia
- Coordinates: 29°26′26″S 151°51′05″E
- Operator: State Rail Authority
- Line: Main North
- Distance: 718.431 km (446.412 mi) from Central
- Platforms: 1 (1 side)
- Tracks: 1

Construction
- Structure type: Ground

Other information
- Status: Disused

History
- Opened: 1 September 1886 (139 years ago)
- Closed: 22 October 1989 (36 years ago)

Services
Preceding station	Former services	Following station
Bolivia towards Wallangarra	Main Northern Line	Dundee towards Sydney
Location

Deepwater railway station is a former regional railway station located on the Main North line, serving the New England town of Deepwater.

== History ==
Deepwater station was opened on 1 September 1886 when the Main North railway line was extended to Tenterfield, from its previous terminus at Glen Innes.

The station was important for the local mining industry, which relied on freight services to transport resources and equipment from Deepwater to Newcastle or Sydney. A 20-ton crane was installed to handle loads of machinery for transportation, as well as a smaller 5-ton crane located close to the goods loading bank but which was permanently removed due to disrepair in 1923.

In the early 1900s, special excursion trains would be run for the annual racing meeting held by the Deepwater Jockey Club, with hundreds of attendees utilising the special services.

A railway line between Deepwater and Inverell via Emmaville was proposed in 1908, with the intention to support the dairy industry which was experiencing major growth in the local area. However this line was never constructed. In 1920, a railway line between Deepwater and Ashford via Emmaville was proposed. No survey of the line or report had been made by September 1922. The route for the proposed line was finally surveyed in February 1923, but was found to have too many difficult grades for steam trains. A new and flatter route was then decided upon, though by March a railway line to Ashford from Inverell was preferred. The line from Inverell was authorised to be constructed in 1927 at an estimated cost of £262,000, but was never built.

The Deepwater station buildings closed to the public on 8 January 1979. The last railway service to operate through the station ran on 22 October 1989, after which it was formally closed. Scheduled stopping passenger services had already ceased the year prior.

After closure the station buildings were leased to a pottery and arts club, followed by the local radio station, but have been vacant since the 2000s when the radio station moved to Glen Innes.

== Description ==
The station itself consisted of a single brick platform with gravelled surface, located on the western side of the line, with a large collection of station buildings on the platform. An iron watertank and water column were constructed at the northern end of the platform, with two jib cranes used for double headed steam services.

As well as the main line, another track ran through the station, acting as a passing loop. A siding was also located at the northern end, ending behind the platform. The cranes and watertank as well as a coal bin were all located on the siding. A goods platform was located further north along the siding, with connections between the siding and main line constructed to allow through-running services to load goods.

Another tank was located at the southern end of the platform, and directly south of the station were the station master's residence, a ganger's house and gate house. The gate house was constructed for the gate master who controlled a level crossing from Simpson Street.

The station platform and buildings, the station master's residence and the watertank and jib cranes are all that remain at Deepwater.

== Gallery ==
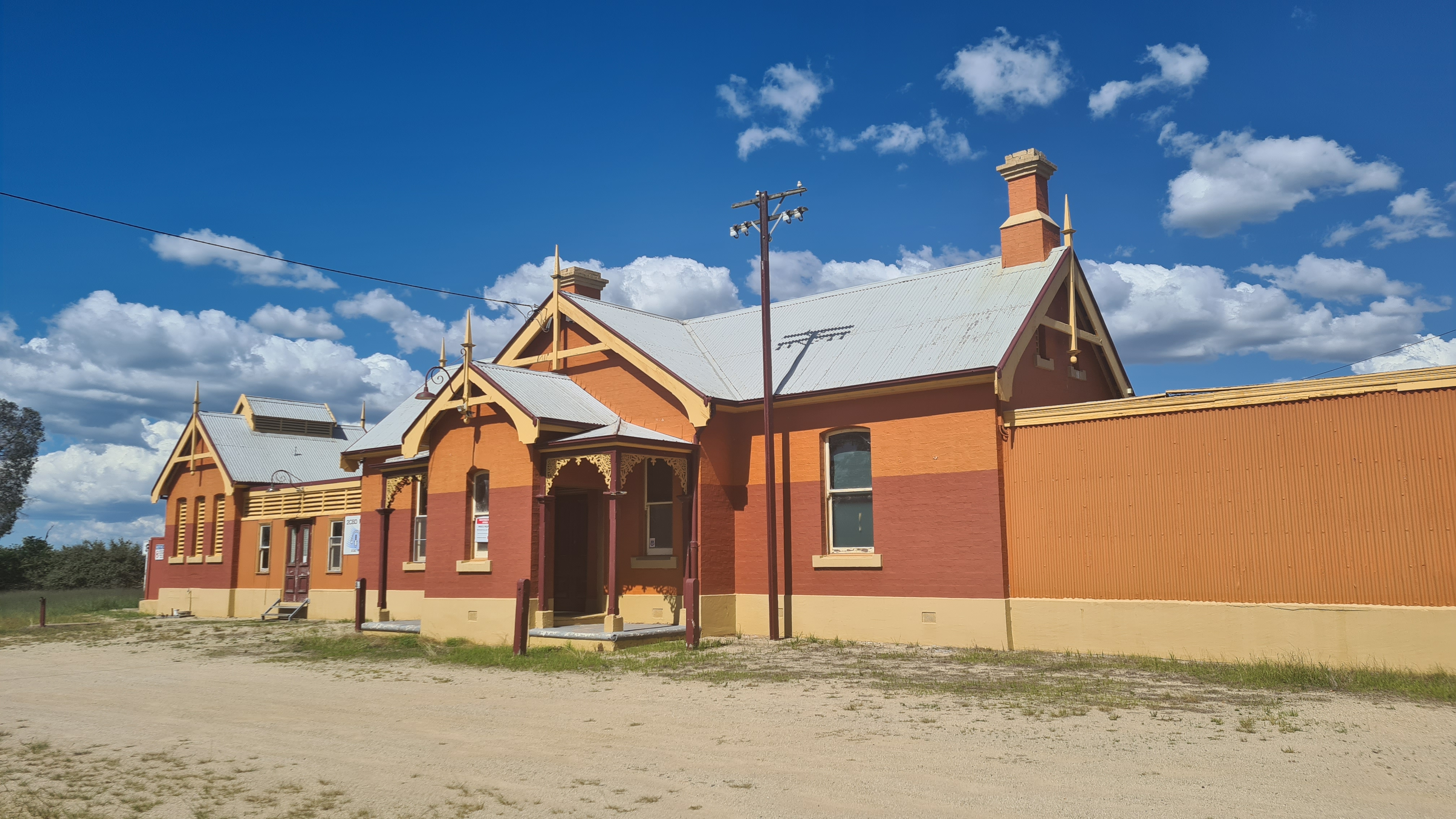
The disused station buildings in January 2021

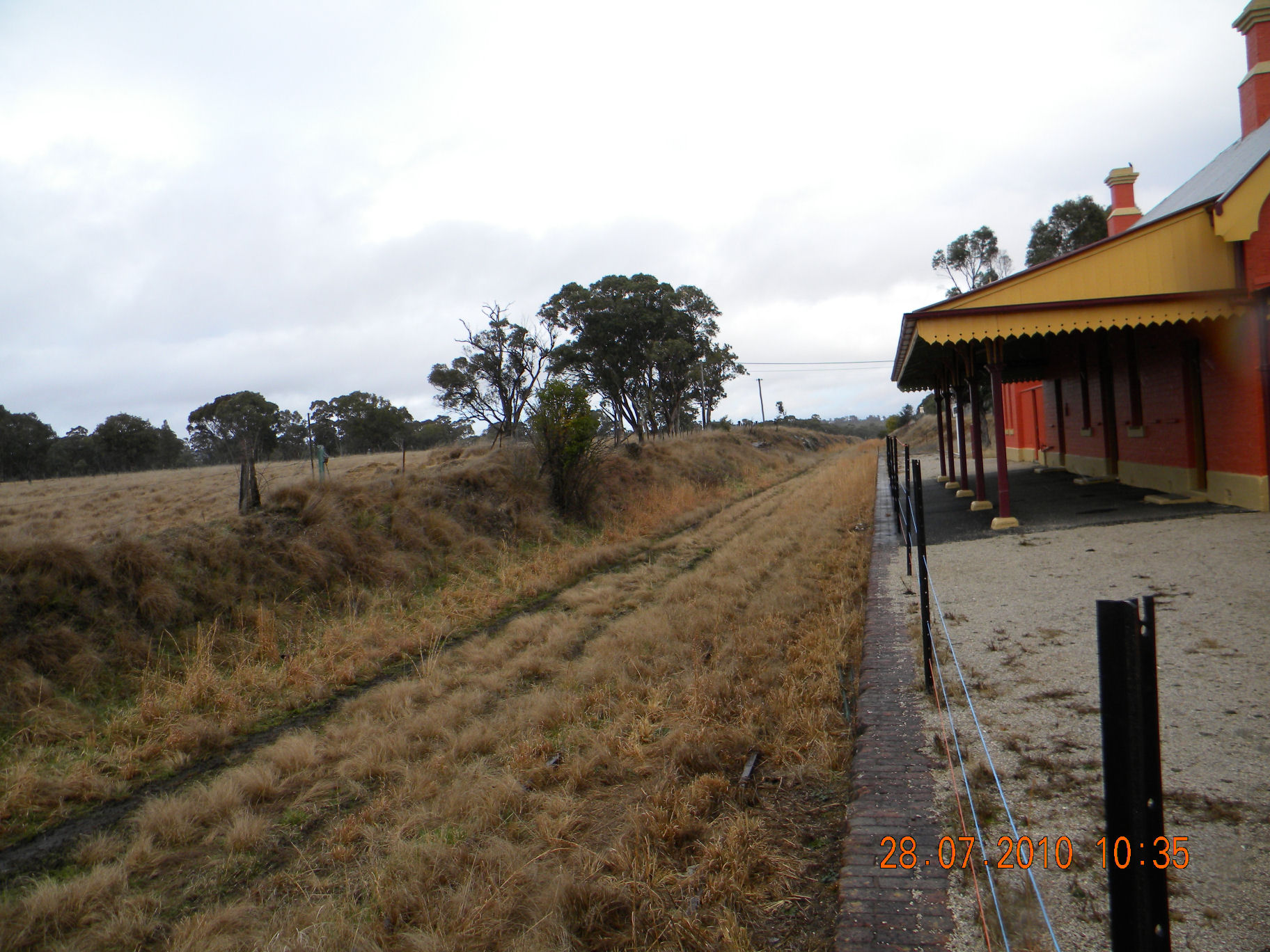
Southbound view from the platform in July 2010

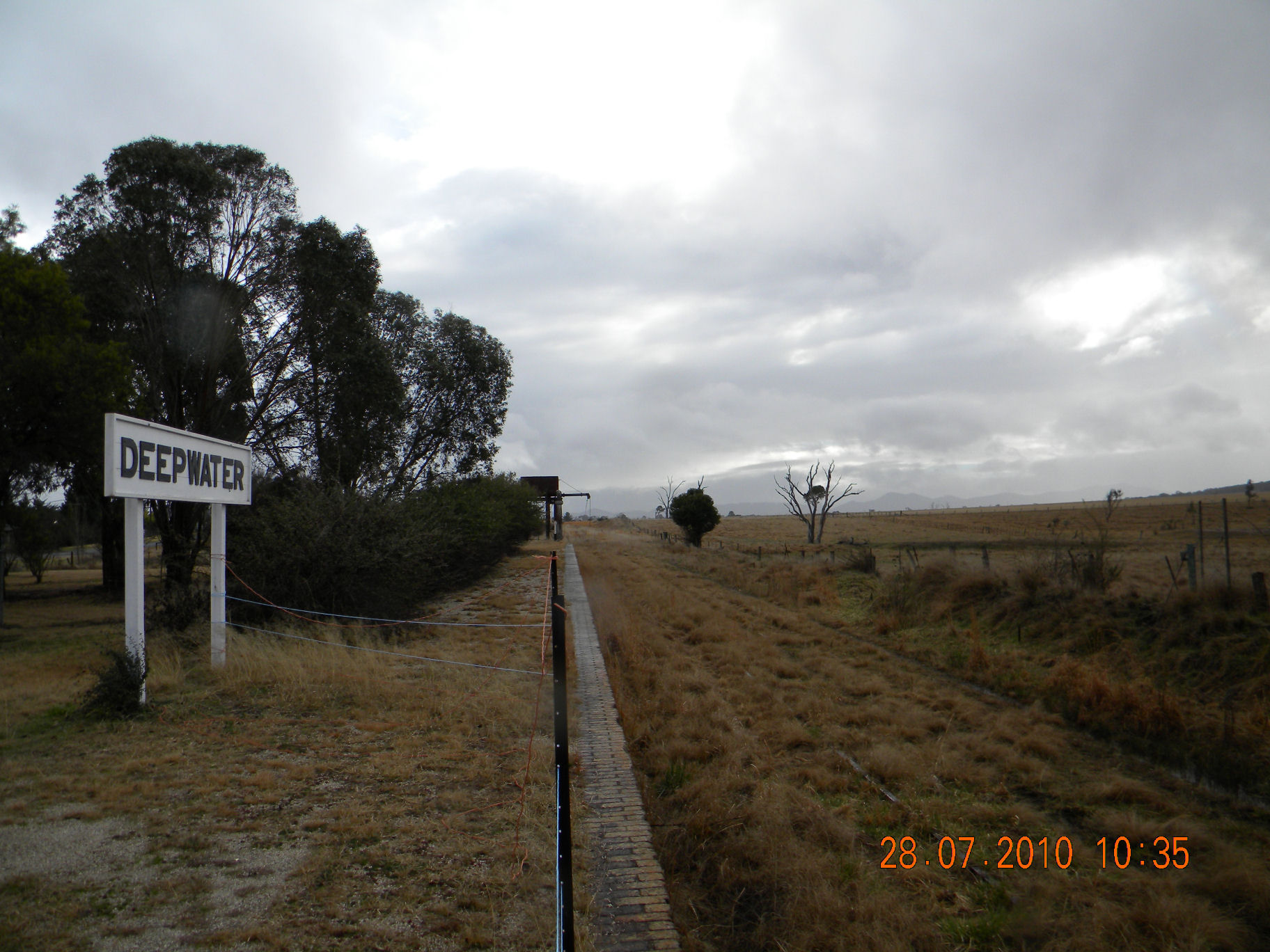
Northbound view from the platform in July 2010

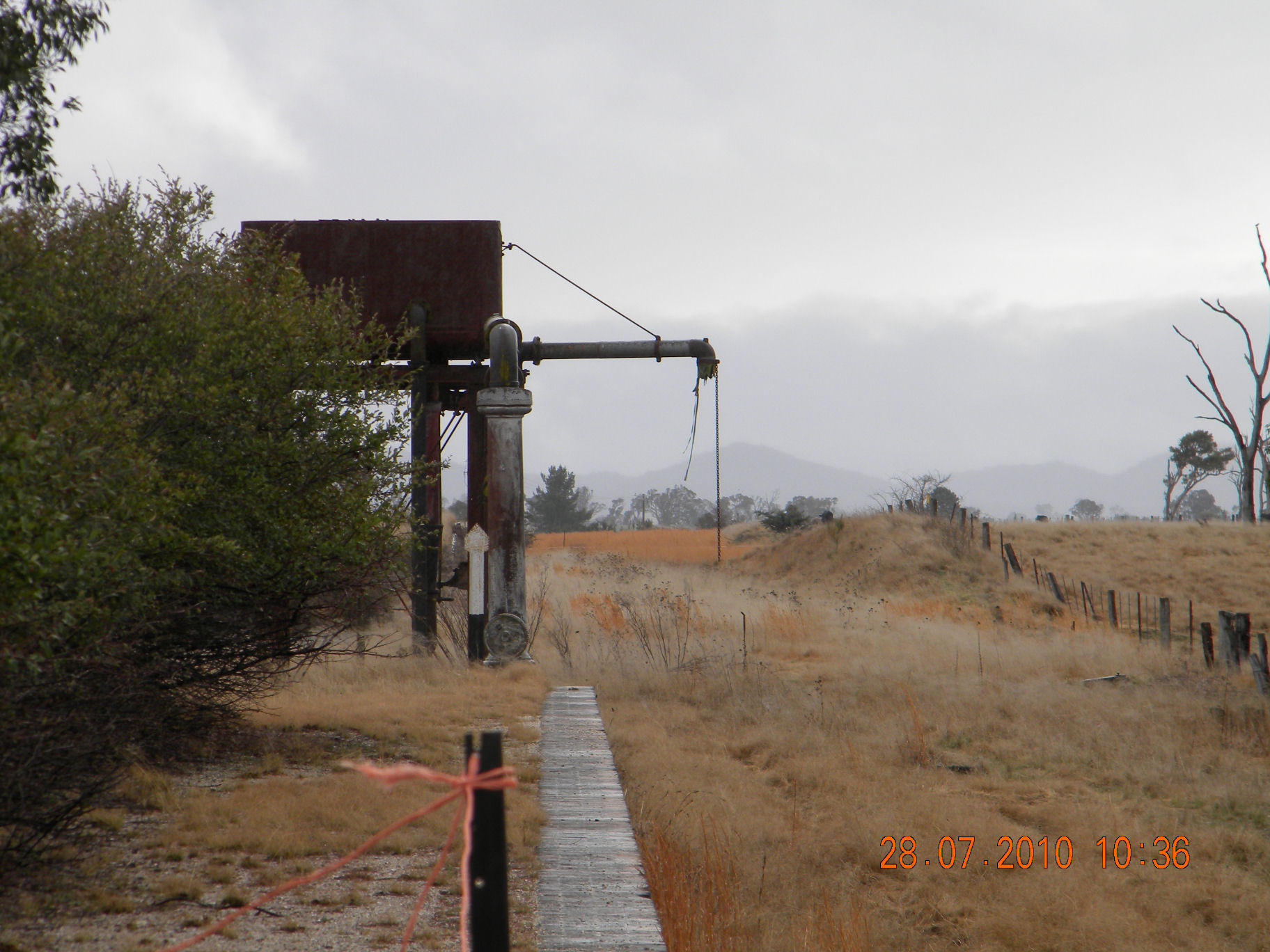
The remains of the water tank and column in July 2010
