= Peter Hope Lumley =

English model agent and public relations consultant (1920–2004)

- Born: 30 March 1920; Chelsea, London
- Died: 11 June 2004 (aged 84)
- Occupation: Model agent

Peter Hope Lumley (30 March 1920 – 11 June 2004) was an English model agent and public relations consultant.

== Early life and family ==
Peter Lumley was born in Chelsea, London, on 30 March 1920 to Charles Hope Lumley and his wife Kathleen. He was educated at Ottershaw College, Surrey, after which he studied German art and literature at the Ludwig-Maximilians-Universität München.

Lumley served in the 8th Battalion, The Buffs, and then the Intelligence Corps, during the Second World War. He declined to be commissioned and was demobilised as a sergeant major. He was mentioned in despatches.

In 1947, Lumley married Priscilla Kincaid-Smith with whom he had a son and a daughter. After that marriage was dissolved, he married Charlotte Warren-Davis in 1965 with whom he had three daughters. That marriage also ended in divorce.

== Career ==
In 1947, Lumley set himself up as a public relations consultant. Among his first clients were the designer Hardy Amies, Nicholas ("Miki") Sekers, and the shoe magnate Edward Rayne.

In 1955, Lumley branched out as a model agent. Among the models on his books were Bronwen Pugh (later Viscountess Astor) and Sally Croker-Poole who married the Aga Khan.

== Death ==
Lumley died on 11 June 2004.
