= Deepwater, New South Wales =

Deepwater
- Town
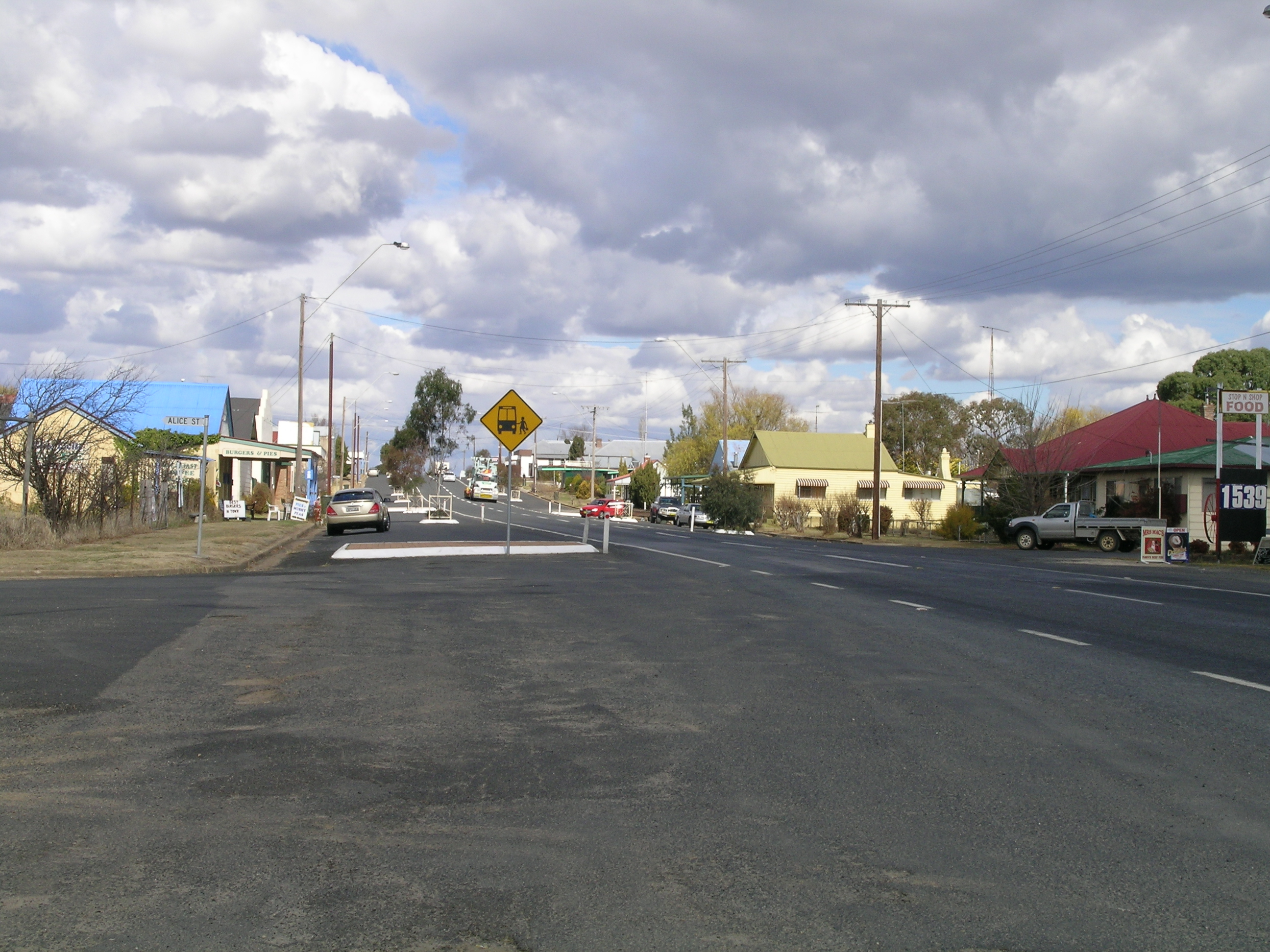
- New England Highway, Deepwater, NSW

- Coordinates: 29°26′0″S 151°51′0″E
- Country: Australia
- State: New South Wales
- LGA: Glen Innes Severn Council
- Location: 644 km (400 mi) N of Sydney; 327 km (203 mi) SW of Brisbane; 139 km (86 mi) N of Armidale; 40 km (25 mi) N of Glen Innes; 53 km (33 mi) S of Tenterfield

Government
  - Federal division: New England
- Elevation: 974 m (3,196 ft)

Population
  - Total: 456 (2016 census)
- Postcode: 2371
- County: Gough

Deepwater is a parish and small town 40 kilometres north of Glen Innes on the Northern Tablelands, New South Wales, Australia. At the 2021 census, Deepwater had a population of 456.

Deepwater is located on the New England Highway and the Main North railway line (now closed). The village is on the northern bank of the Deepwater River which is a tributary of the Mole River. Deepwater is a popular tourist destination for people who enjoy outdoor activities such as fishing, hiking, bird watching, motorbike riding and Gem fossicking. The town has two hotels with accommodation, a bed and breakfast, a craft brewery, antique shop, Diner, Roadhouse, bakery, Supermarket and other speciality stores.

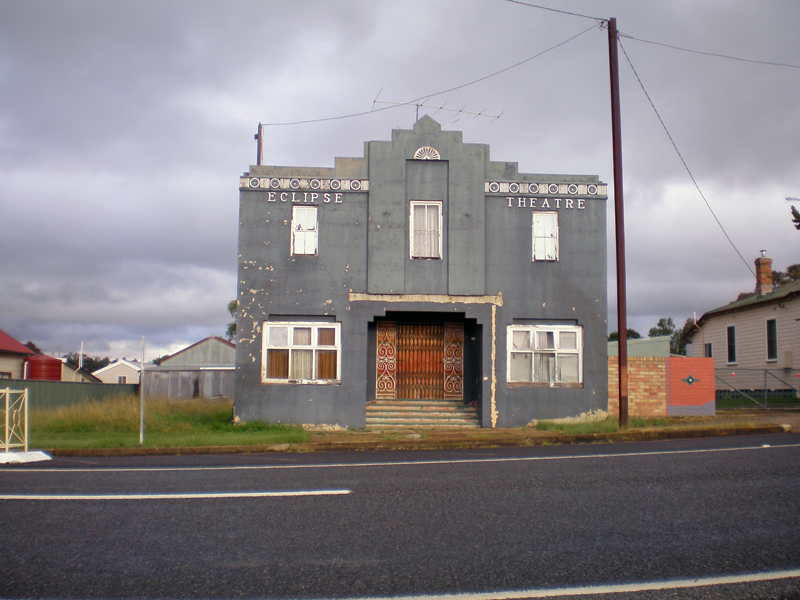
An architectural gem, Deepwater's Art Deco Eclipse Theatre.

== History ==
The land where Deepwater was established is the territory of the Ngarabal people, who had occupied and carefully cultivated the country for thousands of years. The Ngarabal name for Deepwater is Talgambuun, meaning dry country with many dead trees.

The Deepwater run was occupied in 1839 by William Collins for the Windeyer brothers. In 1848 their run covered 60,000 acres (240 km^{2}). The Windeyers had a close relationship with Edward Irby, who took up Bolivia Station further north. There was strong Ngarabal resistance to Irby and Windeyer's incursions into Ngarabal country, including the killings of shepherds. Irby's memoirs record that Windeyer joined him in pursuing and killing groups of Aboriginal people in retaliation for these acts. The principal incident of this was on 17 October 1844, when Irby records that he and Windeyer "gave it to them severely" near Bolivia. In addition, Commissioner for Crown Lands from the Clarence district, Oliver Fry and his assigned troopers, shot a group of Aboriginal people from further east into Ngarabal country at Deepwater, murdering five children, four women and seven men on 15 April 1845.

Deepwater railway station was opened in 1886, and served the town until closure in 1989. The Deepwater Public School was established in 1894. Some of the old buildings still in existence are the Deepwater Inn (currently being restored after a fire), Picture Theatre, Court House, Post Office, School of Arts, General Store and the Deepwater Public School.

Deepwater has an Apex Park, Bakery, School, The Top pub and the Bottom pub, Post Office, CRT, Roadhouse, Antique Store and Foodworks Supermarket. An annual race meeting is held in January at the Deepwater Racecourse located behind the Deepwater Golf Course. It also has service organisations that include the Country Women's Association, Red Cross, Far West and Apex Club, SES and Rural Fire Service, pre-school and some other community organisations.

The district is an agricultural area with the main pursuits being wool, fat lamb and beef cattle production. In the past dairying, tin mining and timber were industries that contributed to the economy of the district.

== Media ==
Local news coverage is provided by Glen Innes News which publishes online as well as in print.

Deepwater is served by community radio station 2CBD FM which broadcasts from studios in Glen Innes

== Notable people ==
- Alex Cameron
- Michael Burge: journalist, author, publisher and artist
