= John Beaumont Williams =

Australian botanist

- Born: 12 February 1932; Sydney, New South Wales, Australia
- Died: July 31, 2005 (aged 73); Armidale, New South Wales, Australia
- Education: University of Sydney
- Scientific career
- Fields: Botany
- Workplaces: University of New England
- Doctoral advisor: Noel Beadle
- Author abbrev. (botany): J.B.Williams

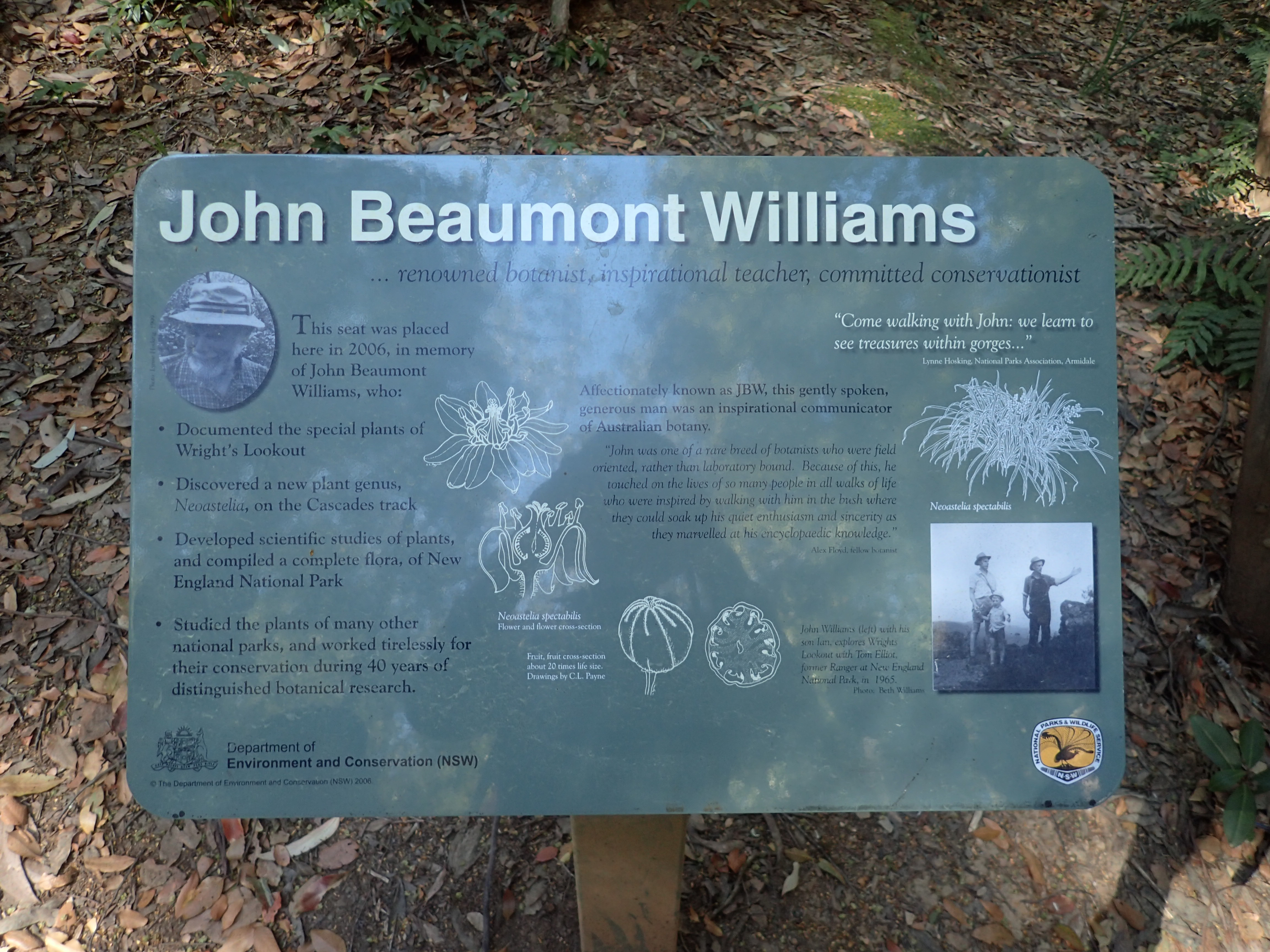
Memorial to Williams in the New England National Park

John Beaumont Williams (12 February 1932 – 31 July 2005) was an Australian botanist who spent most of his working life, from 1957 until 1992 as a lecturer in taxonomy, anatomy and ecology at the University of New England. He graduated Bachelor of Science from Sydney University in 1953 and commenced a PhD under the supervision of Noel Beadle. When Beadle was appointed Chair of Botany at the University of New England, Williams followed to take up a lecturing position at the same institution and to complete his PhD. For the next few years he concentrated on teaching, fieldwork and producing plant lists for north-eastern New South Wales as well as spending time studying in the Jodrell Laboratory at Royal Botanic Gardens, Kew working on the family Haemodoraceae.

As well as his work at the University of New England, Williams was member, secretary and chairman of the New England National Park Trust, a member of the New England and Dorrigo National Park Advisory Committee and was a leader in the university's continuing education Ecofest schools. He contributed to an understanding of the botany and ecology of north-eastern New South Wales, to the conservation and protection of rainforest areas such as Terania Creek in the Nightcap National Park and to the genera Eucalyptus and Parsonsia. During the years 1975 to 1990, Williams travelled extensively, collecting herbarium specimens in many parts of Australia and contributed about 11,500 specimens to the N.C.W. Beadle Herbarium at UNE which now holds more than 73,000 plant specimens.

In 1993, Williams retired and in the following year was appointed a Fellow of the UNE. He continued to work on botanical projects, including to the 1984 edition of "Rainforest Trees and Shrubs". He is the author of 36 papers on members of the genera Parsonsia and Neoastelia but also on the rare Boronia boliviensis, Eucalyptus boliviana and others. The lichen species Menegazzia williamsii is named in his honour, as is the plant Melaleuca williamsii.
