= Biodiversity park, Hyderabad =

Park in Hyderabad, India

Biodiversity Park
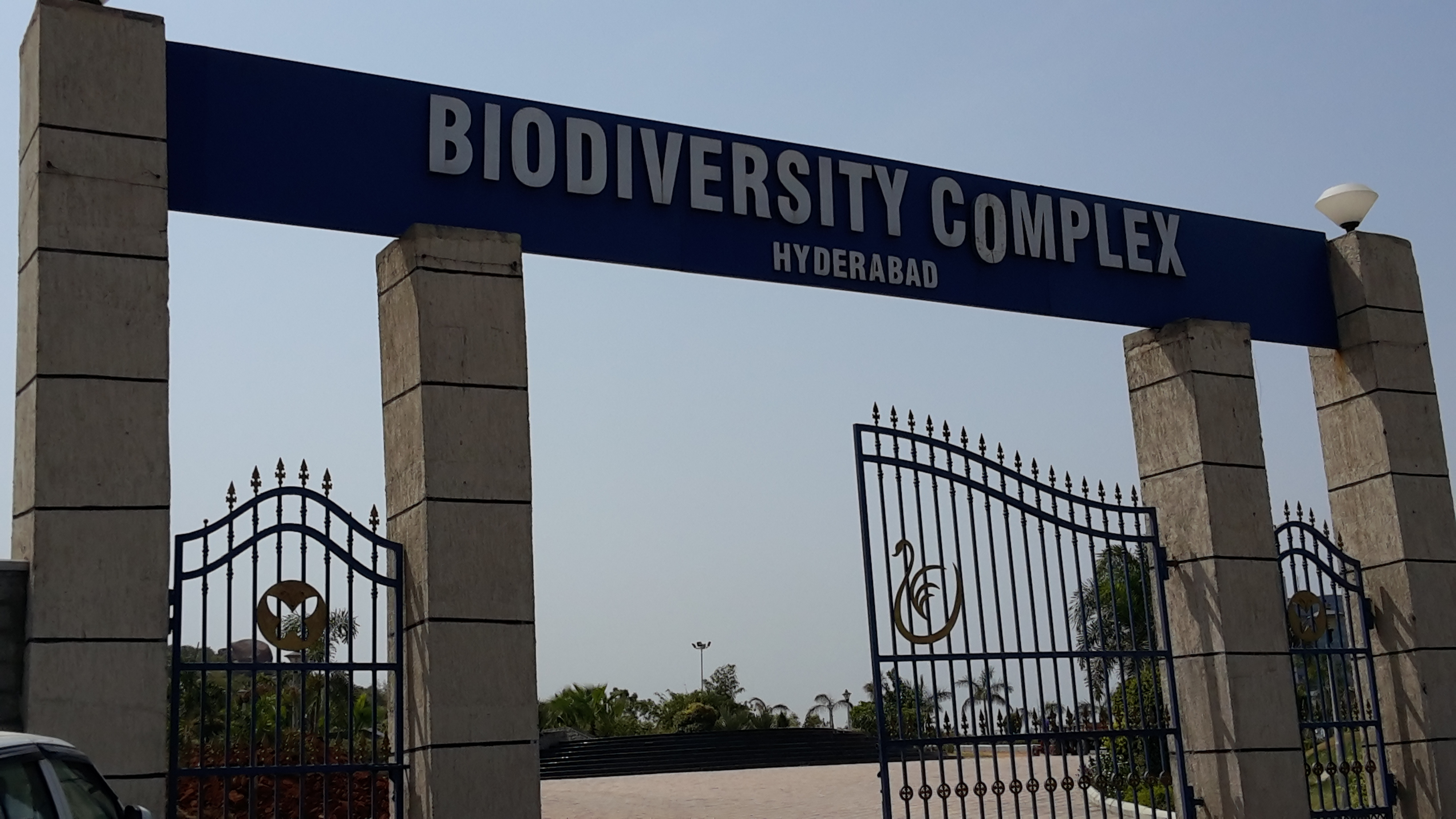
- Main entrance to the park.
- Interactive map of Biodiversity Park
- Type: Public park
- Location: Gachibowli, Hyderabad, India
- Coordinates: 17.4286°N 78.3752°E
- Status: Open all year

The Biodiversity Park in Gachibowli, Hyderabad was established during the Convention on Biological Diversity held in 2012. It was inaugurated along with a commemorative pylon by the Prime Minister of India, Manmohan Singh. It was thrown open to the public on 19 January 2015. The park was set up within the Telangana State Industrial Infrastructure Corporation (TSIIC) Layout at a cost of Rs. 2 crores. It is 1.6 km from Raidurg metro station.

== The pylon ==
The commemorative pylon is an artistic expression of the great mystery of life on earth and its creation. It is a 32-foot-high elliptical structure made of limestone depicting the evolution of species, starting from an atom, evolving to become molecules, proteins, various life forms and the intelligent human being. The base of the pylon is composed of concentric circles representing nature's five elements – Earth, Air, Water, Fire and Ether. The circular pathway of black granite is engraved with the names of different species. A fire ring is depicted by red granite and yellow limestone. The lower "ether" ring displays a world map with blue ocean waters. At the top of the pylon stands a double helix representing DNA.

== The park ==
The biodiversity park covers an area of 13 acres and is divided into four sectors, containing more than 200 different species of plant. Each of them is represented by a UNO-member country and planted by a scientist who participated in the convention, the Convention on Biological Diversity. It is currently taken care of by the Telangana Forest Department.

=== Plant species in the park ===
Serial No.	Name of the Country	Species	Common name
1.	India	Ficus benghalensis	Banyan tree
2.	Afghanistan	Bauhinia blakeana	Red flowered Bauhinia
3.	Albania	Pterospermum acerifolium	Dinner plate tree
4.	Algeria	Cassia fistula	Indian Laburnum tree
5.	Angola	Conocarpus erectus	Green Buttonwood
6.	Antigua and Barbuda	Pterygota alata	Buddhas's coconut
7.	Argentina	Filicium decipiens	Fern leaf tree
8.	Armenia	Swietenia macrophylla	Large-leaved Mahogany
9.	Australia	Caryota urens	Fish-tail palm
10.	Austria	Bucida buceras	Spainy black olive
11.	Azerbaijan	Colvillea racemosa	Colville's glory
12.	Bahamas	Putranjiva roxburghii	Child-life tree
13.	Bahrain	Pseudobombax grandiflorum	Shaving brush tree
14.	Bangladesh	Citharexylum spinosum	Fiddlewood
15.	Barbados	Parkia biglandulosa	Badminton ball tree
16.	Belarus	Alstonia scholaris	Devil's tree
17.	Belgium	Mimusops elengi/Lagerstroemia speciosa	
18.	Belize	Elaeocarpus serratus	Rudraksha
19.	Benin	Erythrina variegata	Indian coral tree
20.	Bhutan	Grevillea robusta	Silver oak tree
21.	Bolivia	Phyllanthus emblica	Indian gooseberry tree
22.	Bosnia and Herzegovina	Cananga odorata	Ylang-ylang tree
23.	Botswana	Agathis robusta	Queensland Kauri
24.	Brazil	Kigelia africana	Sausage tree
25.	Brunei	Adansonia digitata	Monkey-bread tree
26.	Bulgaria	Terminalia arjuna	Arjuna tree
27.	Burkina Faso	Neolamarckia cadamba	Kadamba tree
28.	Burundi	Ficus benghalensis	Banyam tree
29.	Cambodia	Dysoxylum alliaceum	Lambu
30.	Cameroon	Tabebuia aurea	Caribbean Trumpet tree
31.	Canada	Annona reticulata	Bullock's Heart tree
32.	Cape Verde	Ficus virens	White Fig tree
33.	Central African Republic	Ficus elastica	Indian Rubber tree
34.	Chad	Callistemon polandii	Gold-tipped Bottlebrush
35.	Chile	Ficus benjamina	Weeping fig tree
36.	China	Terminalia catappa	Indian Almond tree
37.	Colombia	Artocarpus heterophyllus	Jackfruit tree
38.	Comoros	Handroanthus impetiginosus	Pink Trumpet tree
39.	Congo	Schleichera oleosa	Lac tree
40.	Cook Islands	Callistemon citrinus	Weeping Bottlebrush
41.	Costa Rica	Calliandra haematocephala	Red Powder Puff
42.	Cote D'ivoire	Albizia lebbeck	East Indian Walnut, Siris
43.	Croatia	Albizia chinensis	Stipulate Albizia
44.	Cuba	Filicium decipiens	Fern Leaf tree
45.	Cyprus	Calophyllum inophyllum	Alexandrian Laurel
46.	Czech Republic	Cordia sebestena	Sebastan Plum
47.	Democratic People's Republic of Korea	Mangifera indica	Mango tree
48.	Democratic Republic of Congo	Barringtonia asiatica	Queen of Seashore
49.	Denmark	Heptapleurum actinophyllum	Queensland Umbrella tree
50.	Djibouti	Ficus virens	White Fig tree
51.	Dominica	Ficus lyrata	Fiddleleaf Fig tree
52.	Dominican Republic	Mimusops elengi	Indian Medlar, Bakul
53.	Ecuador	Dalbergia latifolia	East Indian Rosewood
54.	Egypt	Pterospermum canescens	Small leaved Muchkund
55.	El Salvador	Pithecellobium dulce	Monkeypod, Jangle Jalebi
56.	Equatorial Guinea	Callistemon pollandii	Gold-tipped Bottlebrush
57.	Eritrea	Dillenia indica	Elephant Apple tree
58.	Estonia	Simarouba amara	Paradise tree
59.	Ethiopia	Chukrasia tubularis var velutina	Chickrassy
60.	European Union	Mimusops elengi	Indian Medlar, Bakul
61.	Fiji	Mesua ferrea	Iron Wood
62.	Finland	Adonidia merrillii	Christian Palm
63.	France	Muntingia calabura	Singapore Cherry
64.	Gabon	Artocarpus altilis	Bread Fruit tree
65.	Gambia	Nyctanthes arbor-tristis	Coral Jasmina
66.	Georgia	Syzygium jambos	Rose Apple
67.	Germany	Albizia lebbeck	East Indian Walnut, Siris
68.	Ghana	Cochlospermum religiosum	Yellow Silk-Cotton
69.	Greece	Clusia rosea	Autograph tree
70.	Grenada	Mesua ferrea	Iron Wood
71.	Guatemala	Chloroleucon tortum	Brazilian Rain tree
72.	Guinea	Azadirachta indica	Margosa, Neem
73.	Guinea Bissau	Vitex megapotamica	Cuban Pink Trumpet tree
74.	Guyana	Couroupita guianensis	Cannon Ball tree
75.	Haiti	Kavalama urens	Gum Karaya tree
76.	Honduras	Peltophorum pterocarpum	Copper-pod tree
77.	Hungary	Soymida febrifuga	Indian Redwood
78.	Iceland	Terminalia belerica	Belleric Myrobolan tree
79.	Indonesia	Hibiscus tiliaceus	Coast Cotton tree

== Gallery ==
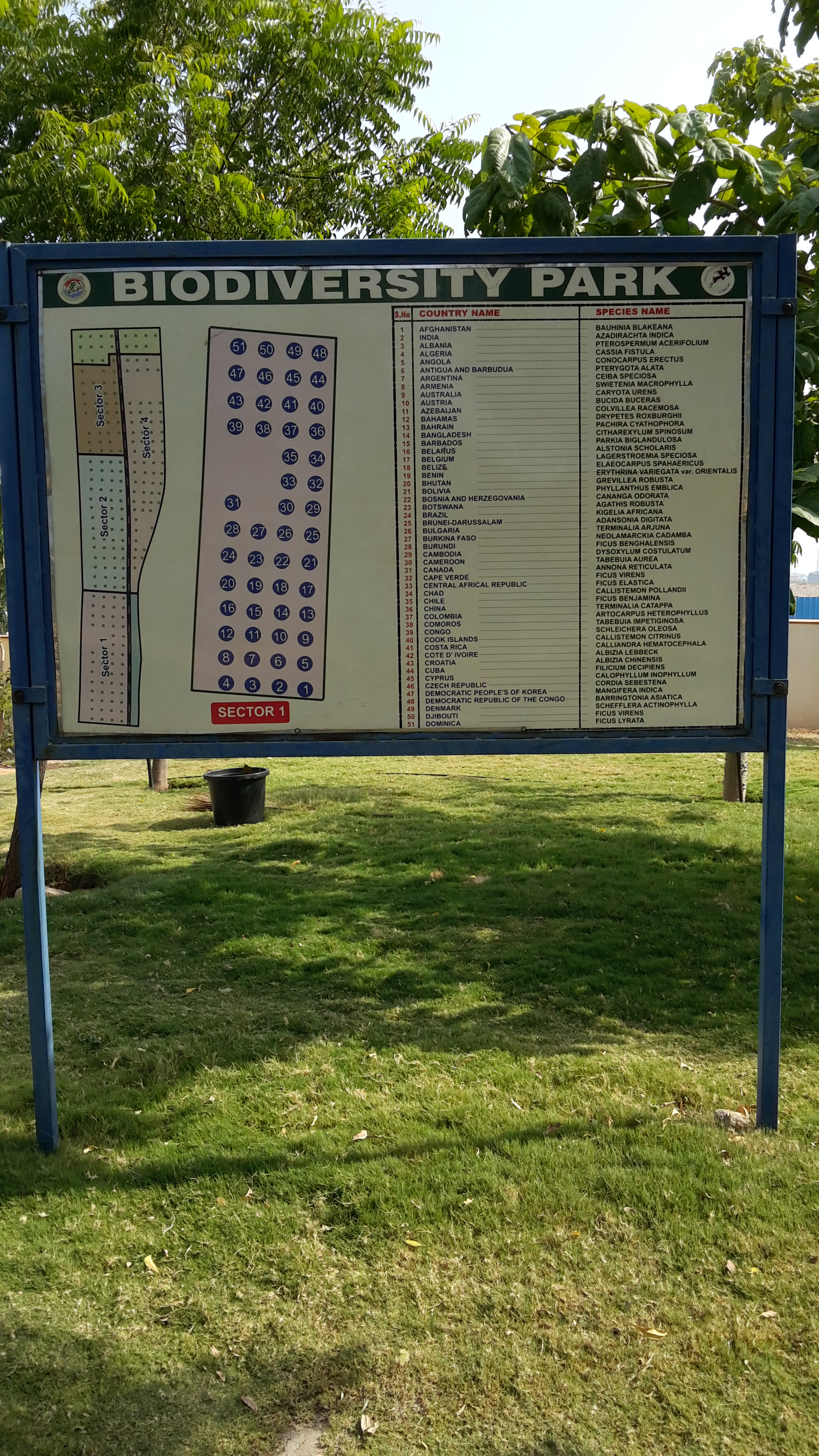
Park layout, sector 1

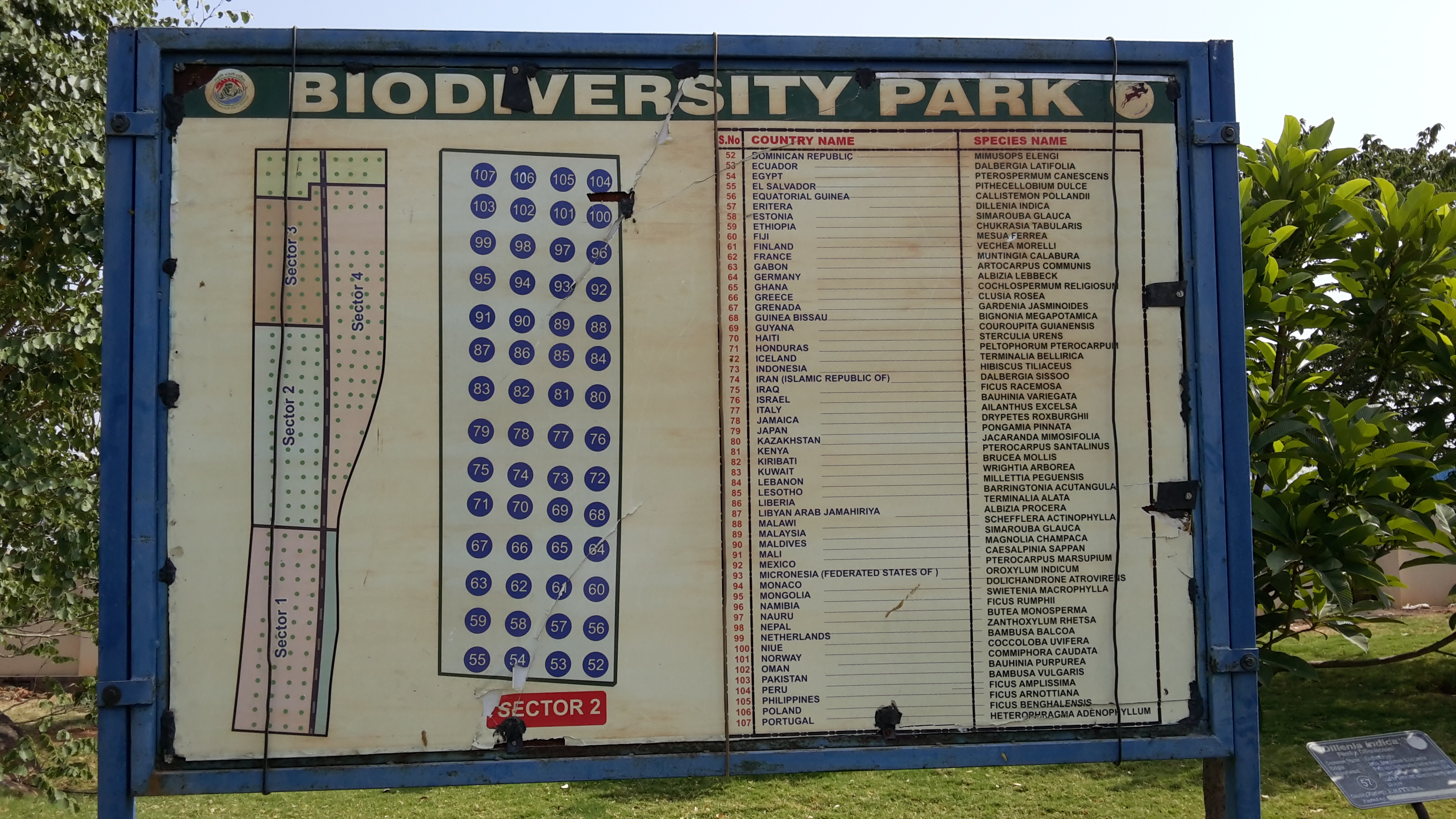
Park layout, sector 2

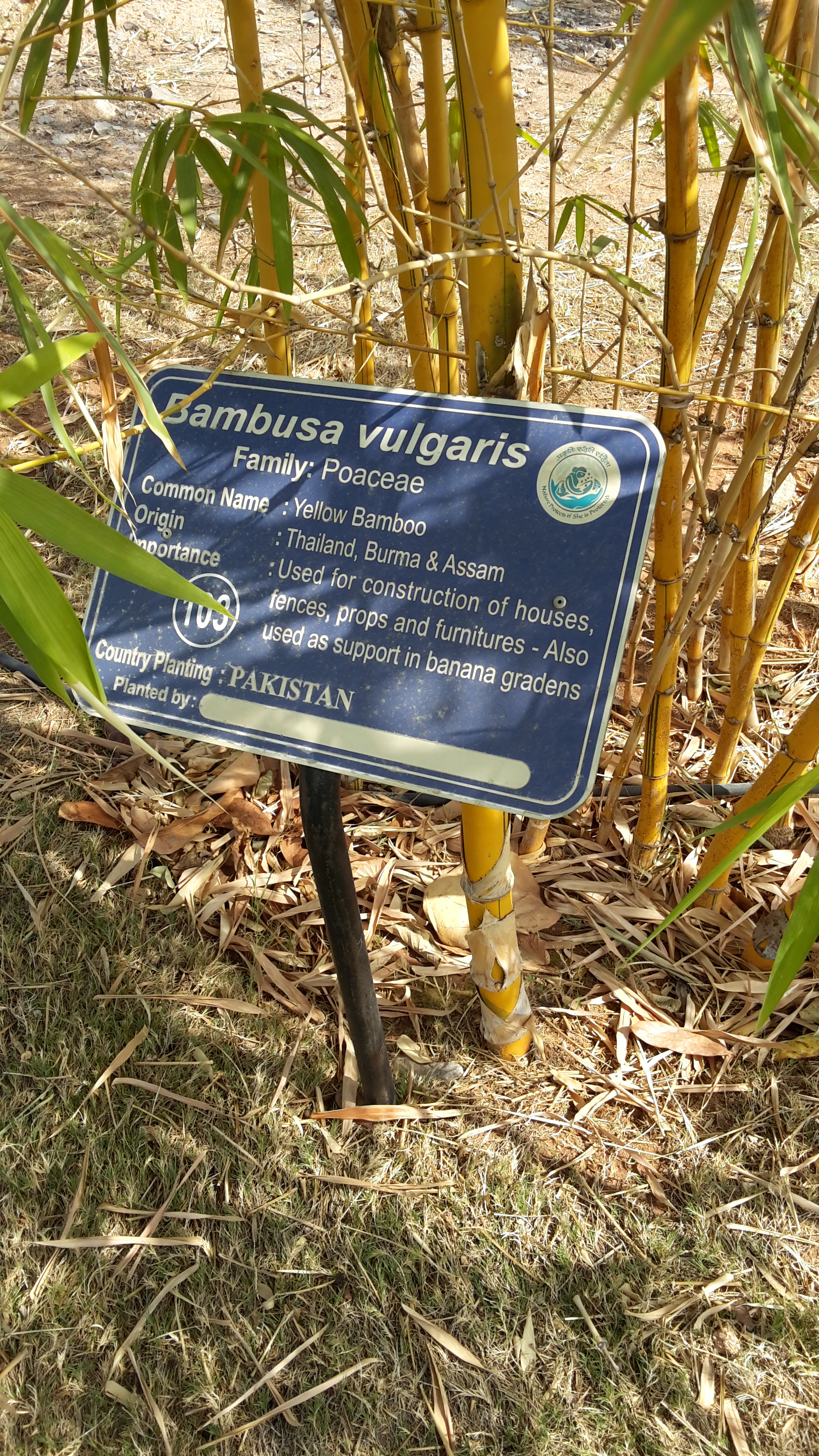
Yellow Bamboo at the park

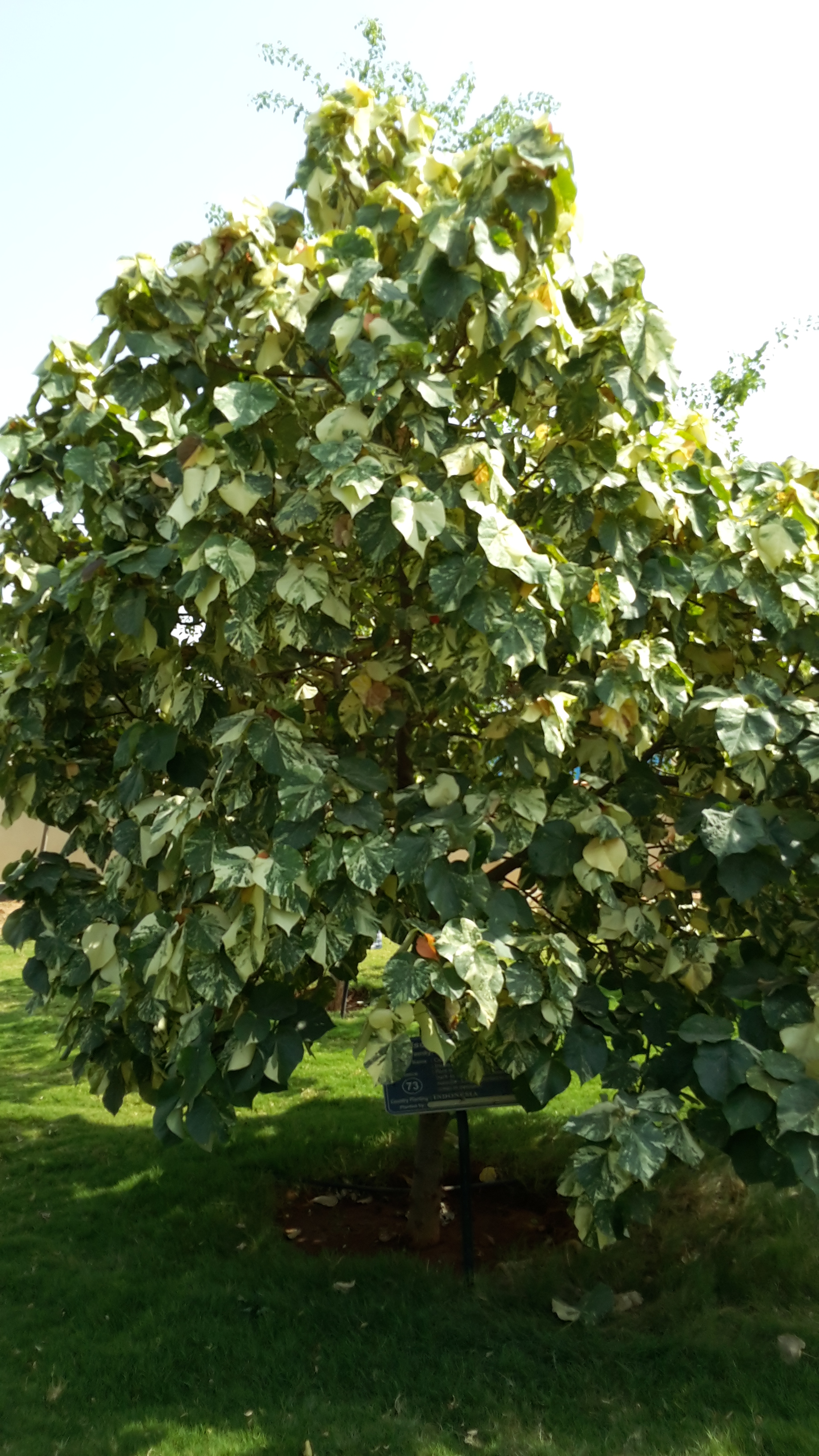
Hibiscus tiliaceus in the park

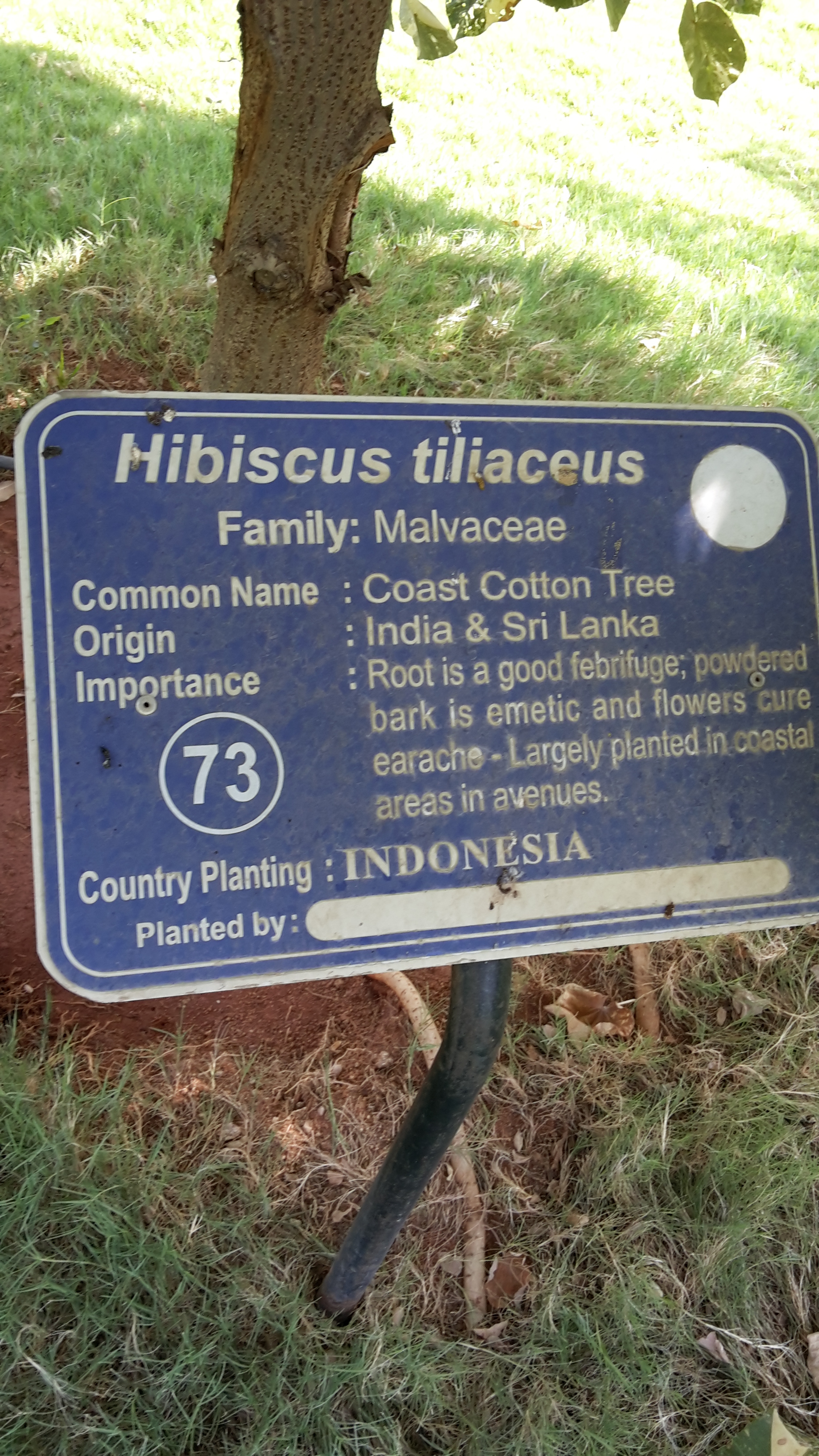
Hibiscus tiliaceus description plate

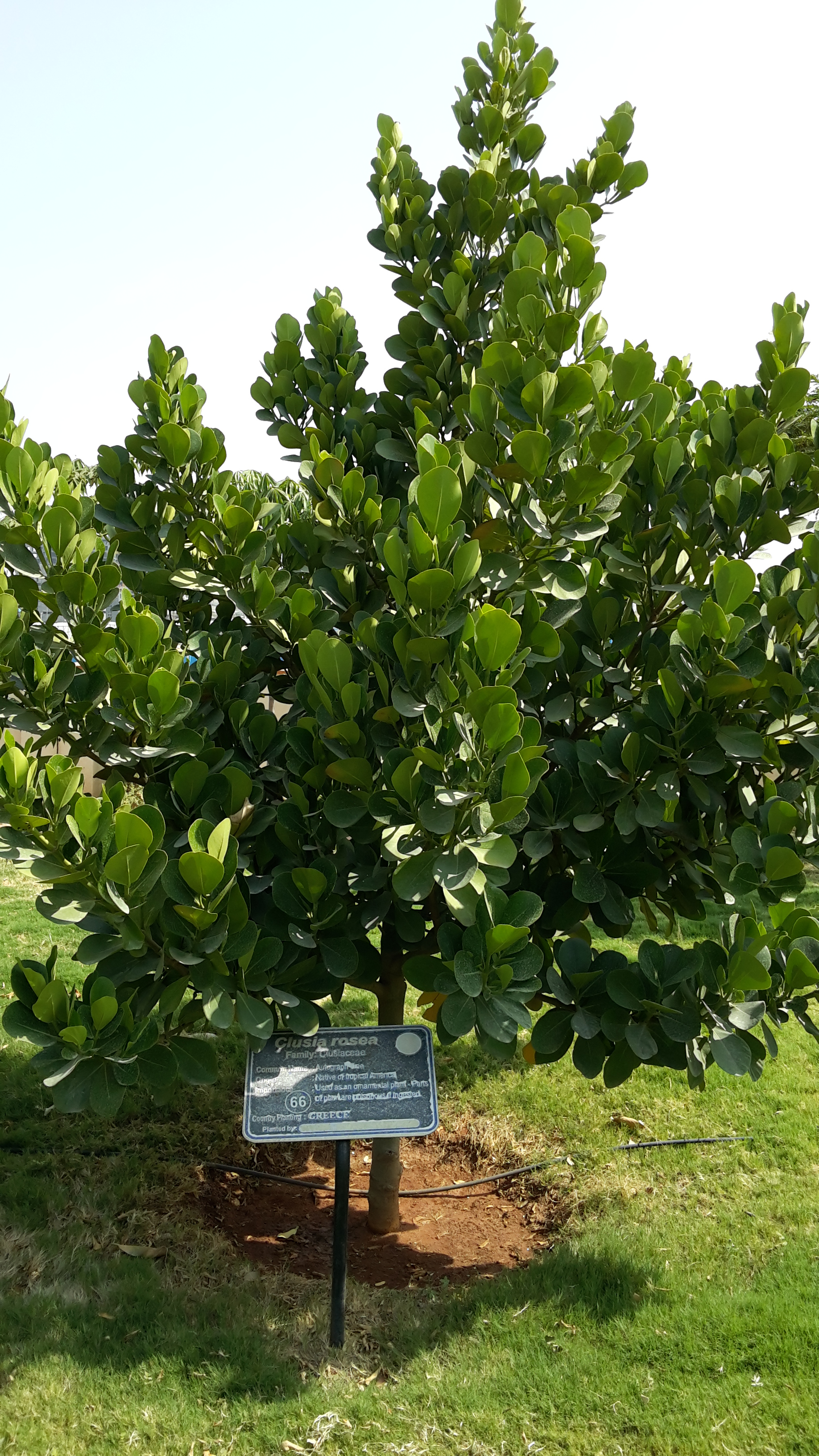
Clusia rosea tree in the park.

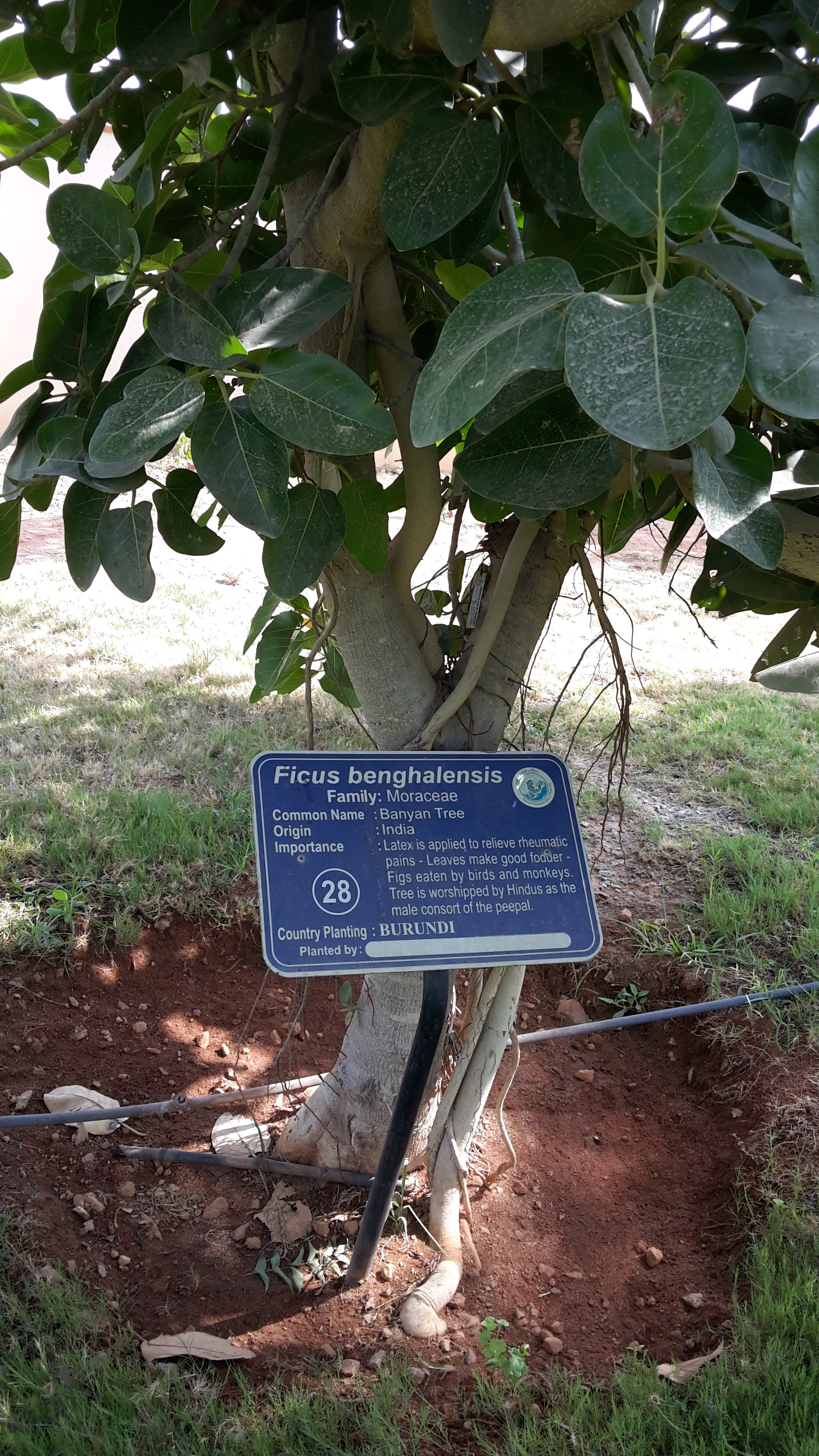
Ficus benghalensis tree in the park.

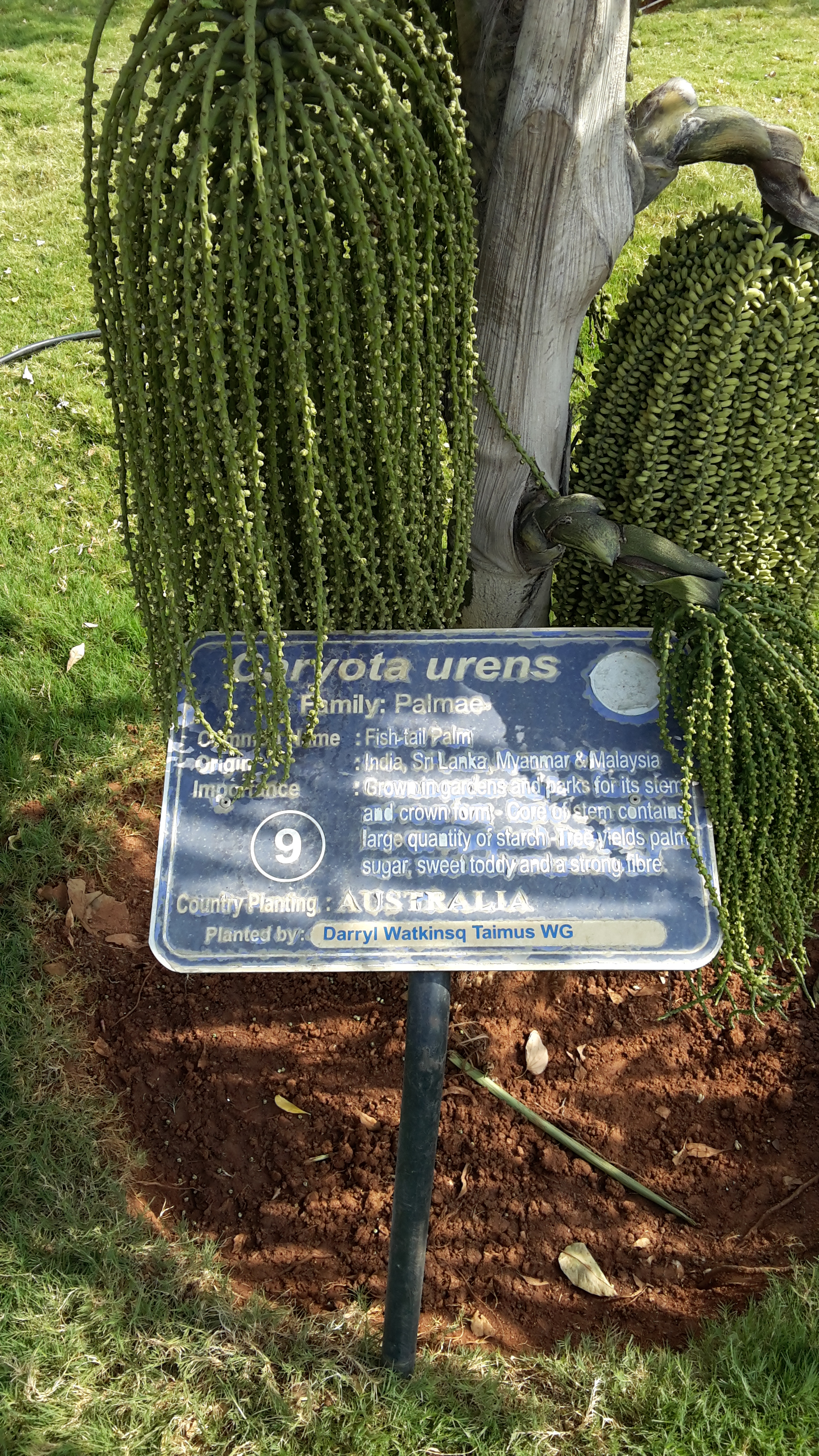
Caryota urens tree in the park.

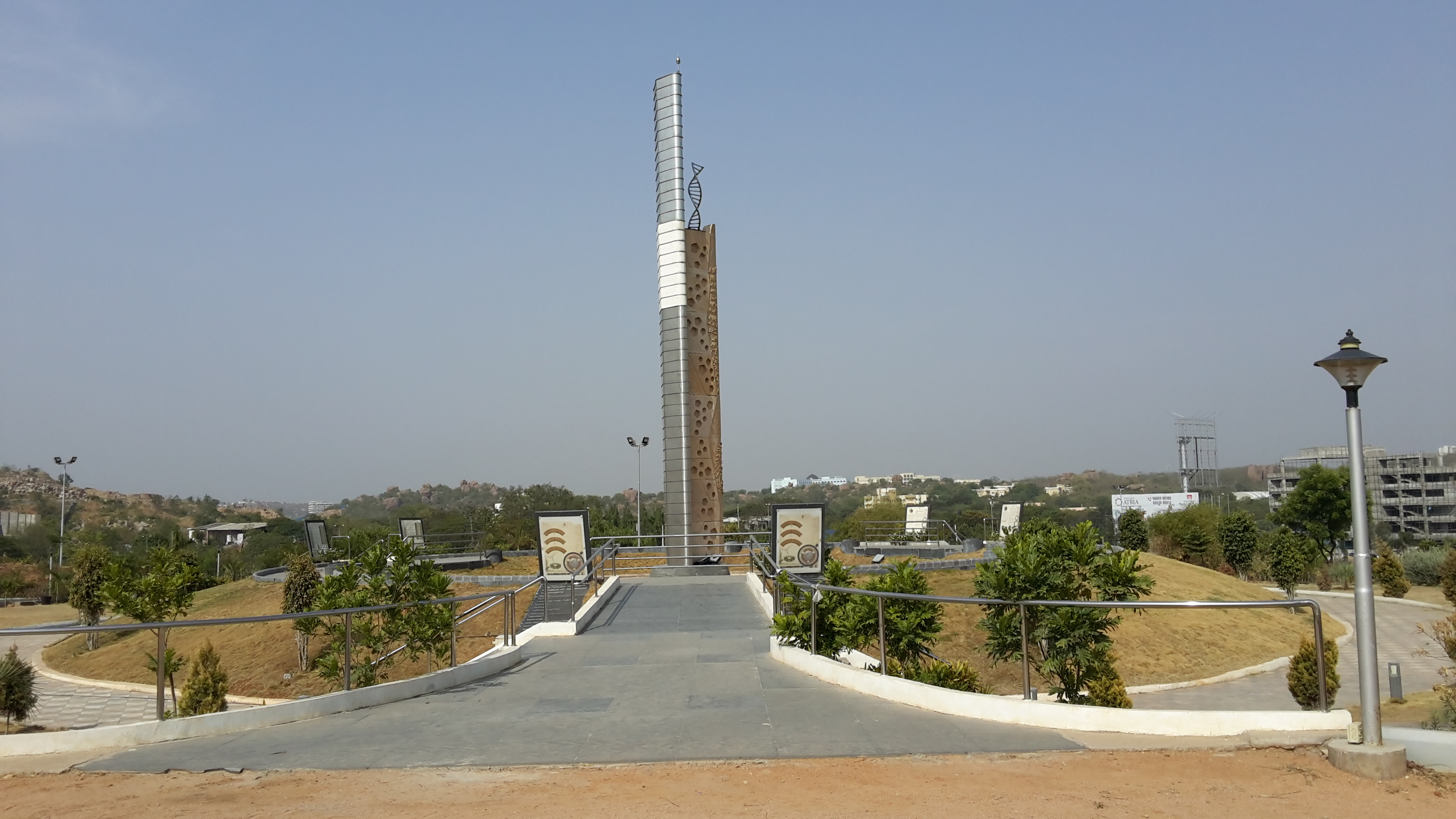
Commemorative pilon

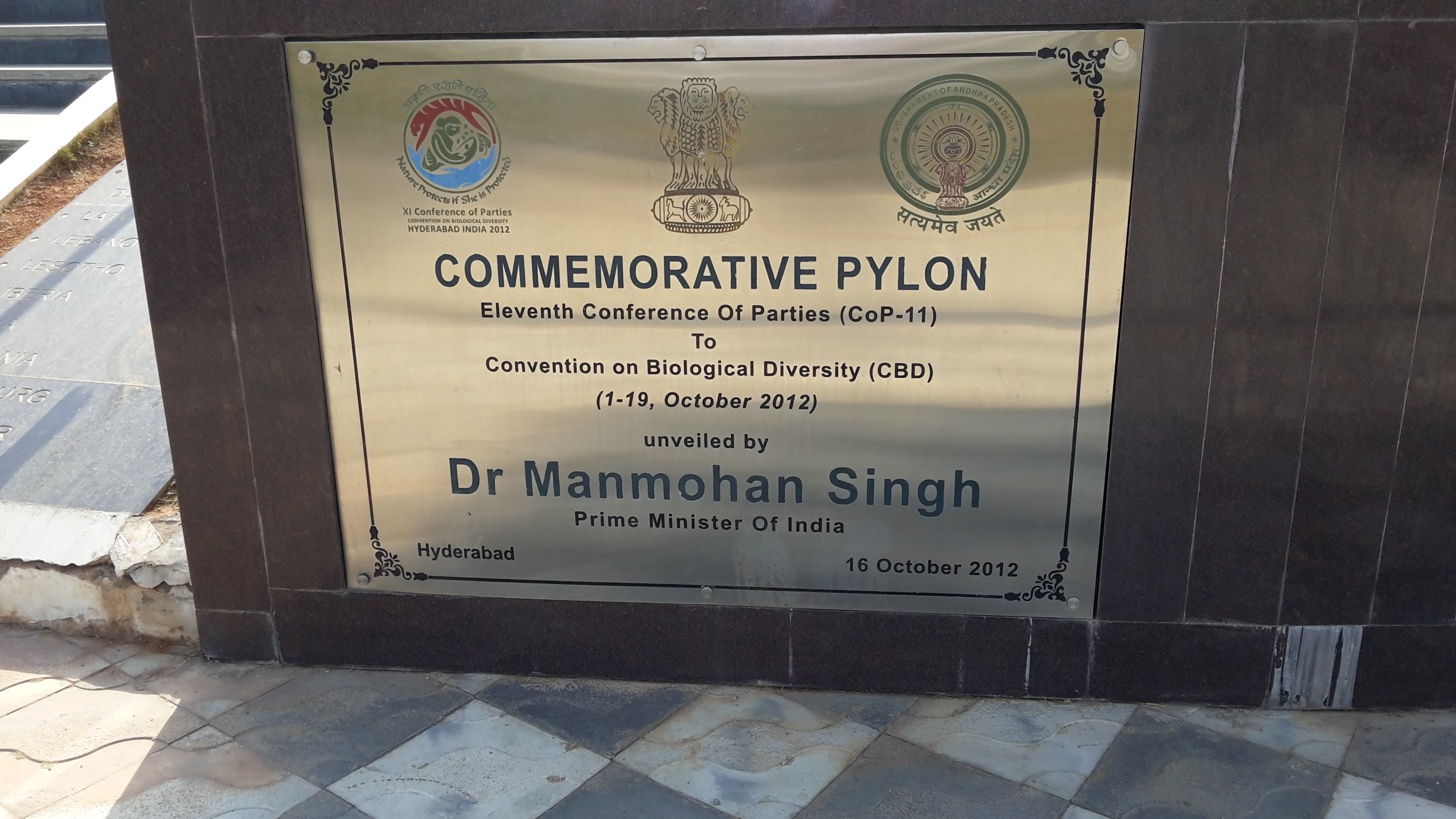
Commemorative pilon, installation plate

== See also ==
- Nehru Zoological Park
- Hyderabad Botanical Garden
- Biodiversity Park, Visakhapatnam
