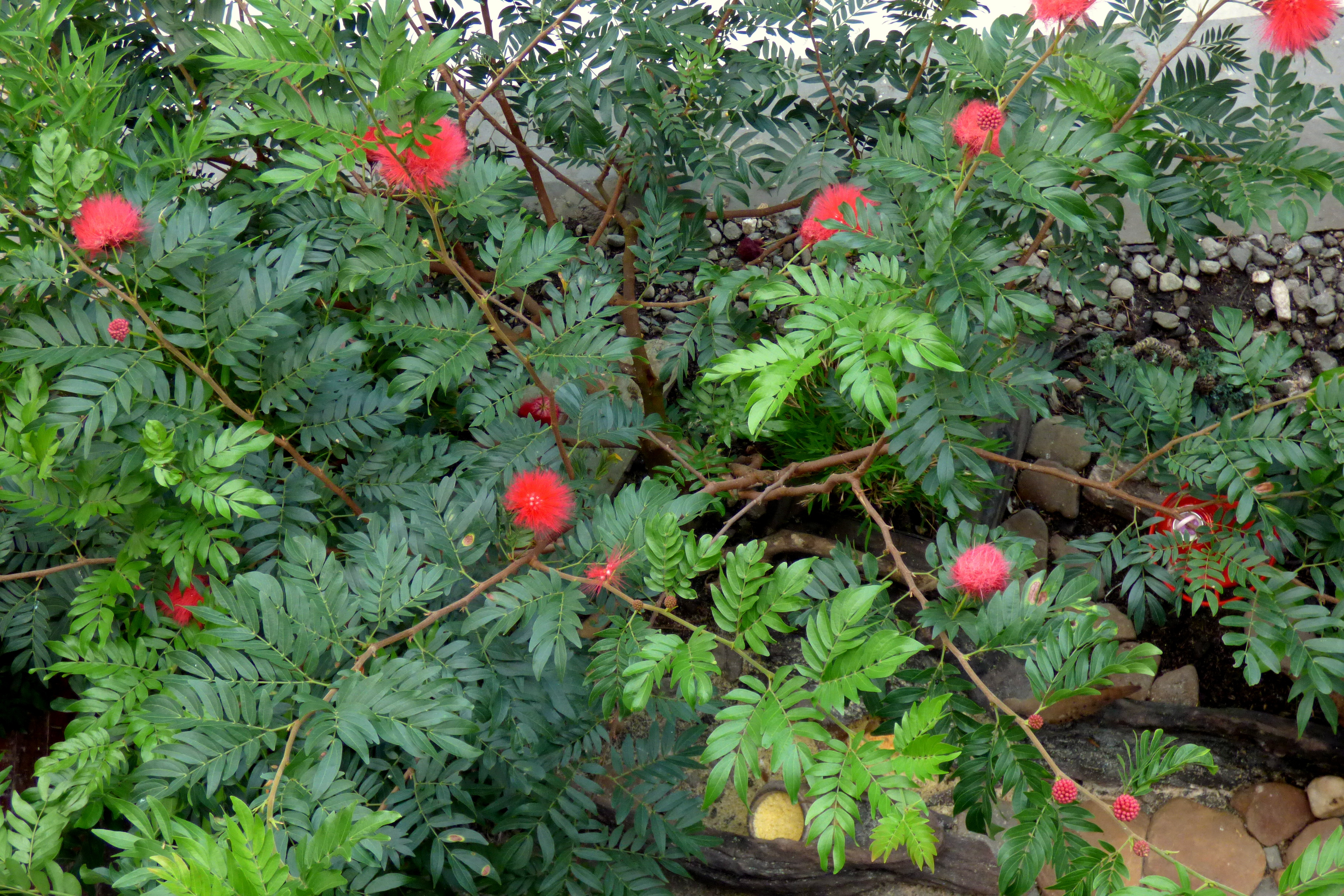

Scientific classification
- Kingdom: Plantae
- Clade: Tracheophytes
- Clade: Angiosperms
- Clade: Eudicots
- Clade: Rosids
- Order: Fabales
- Family: Fabaceae
- Subfamily: Caesalpinioideae
- Clade: Mimosoid clade
- Genus: Calliandra
- Species: C. haematocephala

Binomial name
- Calliandra haematocephala Hassk.

Synonyms
- Anneslia haematocephala (Hassk.) Britton & P.Wilson; Calliandra inaequilatera Rusby; Calliandra novaesii Hoehne; Feuilleea haematocephala Kuntze

= Calliandra haematocephala =

Species of legume

Calliandra haematocephala, the red powder puff, is a species of flowering plants of the genus Calliandra in the family Fabaceae native to Bolivia. In its native habitat it typically grows to about 3–4.5 m (10–15 ft) tall and is widely cultivated as an ornamental flowering shrub in warm climates, where it can grow outdoors year-round.

== Description ==
Rambling shrub or small tree with branched pinnate, silky leaves and powder-puff-like balls of conspicuous dark crimson stamens. Calliandra haematocephala is a fast growing shrub that can grow tall but also spreads wide. It is a spreading, multi-stemmed shrub or small tree, reaching a size of up to 5 m tall. Pinnae 1 pair; leaflets (4–) 5–8 (–10) pairs per pinna, narrowly ovate, elliptic, or obovate, the distal ones 15–84 mm long and 5–35 mm wide, the proximal ones smaller. Its new growth is auburn or reddish and thickly hairy.

The genus name Calliandra derives from the Greek kalli- (“beautiful”) and aner or andros (“male”), referring to the prominent stamens of the flowers. The specific epithet haematocephala means “blood-red head”, alluding to the colour and form of the flower heads.

=== Inflorescences ===
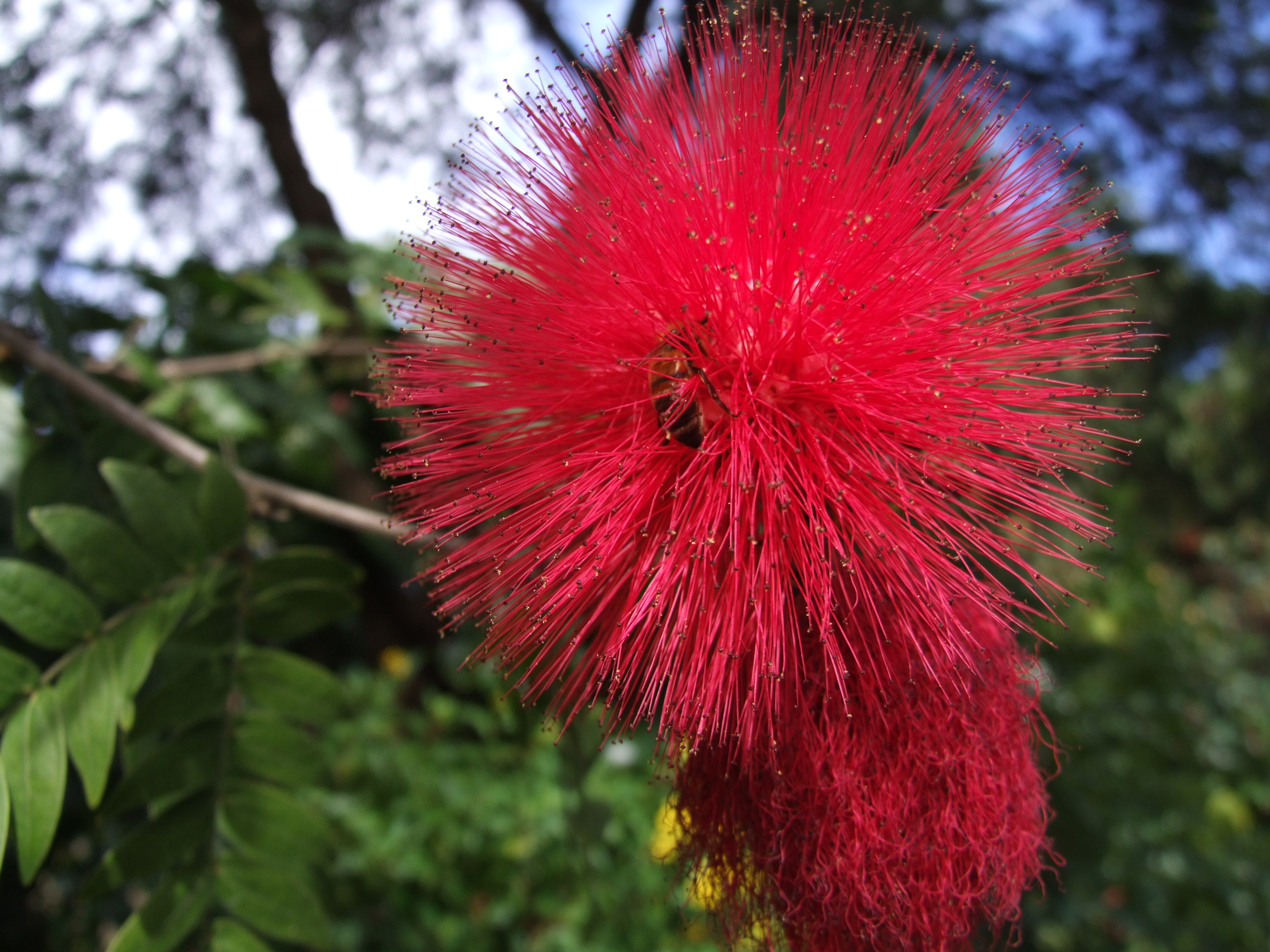
Detail of Calliandra haematocephala inflorescence

The raspberry-like buds develop into hemispherical flower heads up to about 7.5 cm (3 in) across, composed of dense clusters of bright red stamens that give the inflorescences their characteristic “powder puff” appearance. Capitula spherical, heteromorphic, peduncles axillary, 1.2–3.3 (–5.3) cm long, flowers essentially glabrous; calyx campanulate, 1.5–3 mm long; corolla tubular, 8 mm long; filaments red, occasionally white, staminal tube briefly exserted, except in the central flower where it is strongly exserted. Its brilliant red or pinkish red flowers (occasionally white) are borne in large, globular clusters 5–10 cm in diameter in the upper leaf axils. The flowers possess numerous prominent stamens, giving the clusters a soft, fluffy appearance.

Flowering takes place throughout the year, but mainly during autumn and winter, although additional blooms may appear sporadically throughout the year. The red powder puff flowers are attractive to butterflies and hummingbirds but only appear from November to April in the Northern Hemisphere. The buds before the flowers open look like raspberries. Fruit coriaceous, glabrous.

== Cultivation ==
The plant prefers full sun, although it can handle some shade throughout the day, particularly in warmer climates. It cannot withstand frost. It can be grown indoor if trimmed and grown in a pot but it will be best if it grows outside in a warm climate. This species reproduces solely by seed, which is usually spread by water and through the dumping of garden waste. 'Red powderpuff' is widely cultivated as an ornamental plant in south-eastern Queensland. A white-flowered variety, Calliandra haematocephala ‘Alba’, is also commonly grown in the region. No significant insect or disease issues are known, though caterpillars, spider mites, and aphids may occasionally occur.

Both the red- and white-flowered forms have begun to escape cultivation and become naturalised in parts of south-eastern Queensland. The species frequently self-seeds in gardens near cultivated plants and has been recorded spreading along waterways in Brisbane, including Ithaca Creek, Enoggera Creek, and Kedron Brook, as well as in disturbed native flora in coastal areas such as Macleay Island in Moreton Bay. As a result, it is regarded as a prospective or developing environmental weed in the region.

=== Uses ===
Extracts from parts of Calliandra haematocephala have been used in the green synthesis of zinc oxide nanostructures, magnetite nanoparticles, and silver nanoparticles.

== Similar species ==
- This plant closely resembles rose powderpuff (Calliandra ‘Rosea’) and pink powderpuff (Calliandra surinamensis), but can be distinguished by several characteristics:
- Red powderpuff has leaves bearing 4–8 relatively large leaflets (25–50 mm long) on each pinna. When young, the leaves are chestnut or reddish and densely hairy (pubescent). Its flower heads are rounded and composed of numerous flowers (around 60), forming clusters that are brilliant red, crimson, dark red, or reddish-pink; in the cultivar ‘Alba’ they are white.
- Rose powderpuff has 6–10 moderately sized leaflets (15–35 mm long) on each pinna. The young leaves are reddish or pink-tinged and are either sparsely hairy (puberulent) or hairless (glabrous). Its flower clusters are slightly rounded and typically contain about 40 flowers. These bunches are dark pink or pinkish-red, usually with milky-coloured bases.
- Pink powderpuff has 8–12 smaller leaflets (5–25 mm long) on each pinna. The young leaves are light green and smooth (glabrous). Its flower clusters are less rounded and generally consist of about 25 flowers, which are white at the base with pink tips.

== Gallery ==
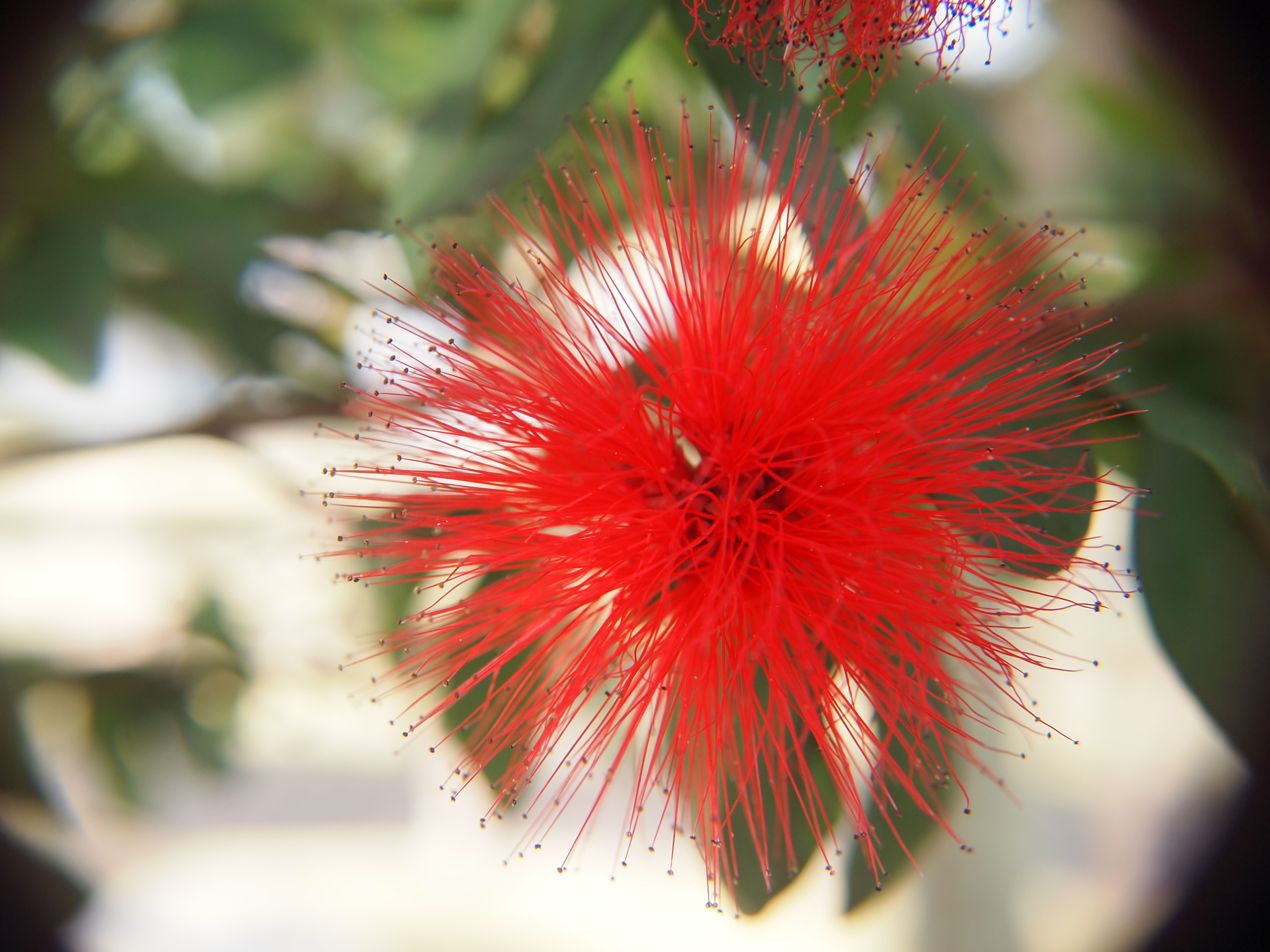
Calliandra haematocephala grown in Malaysia

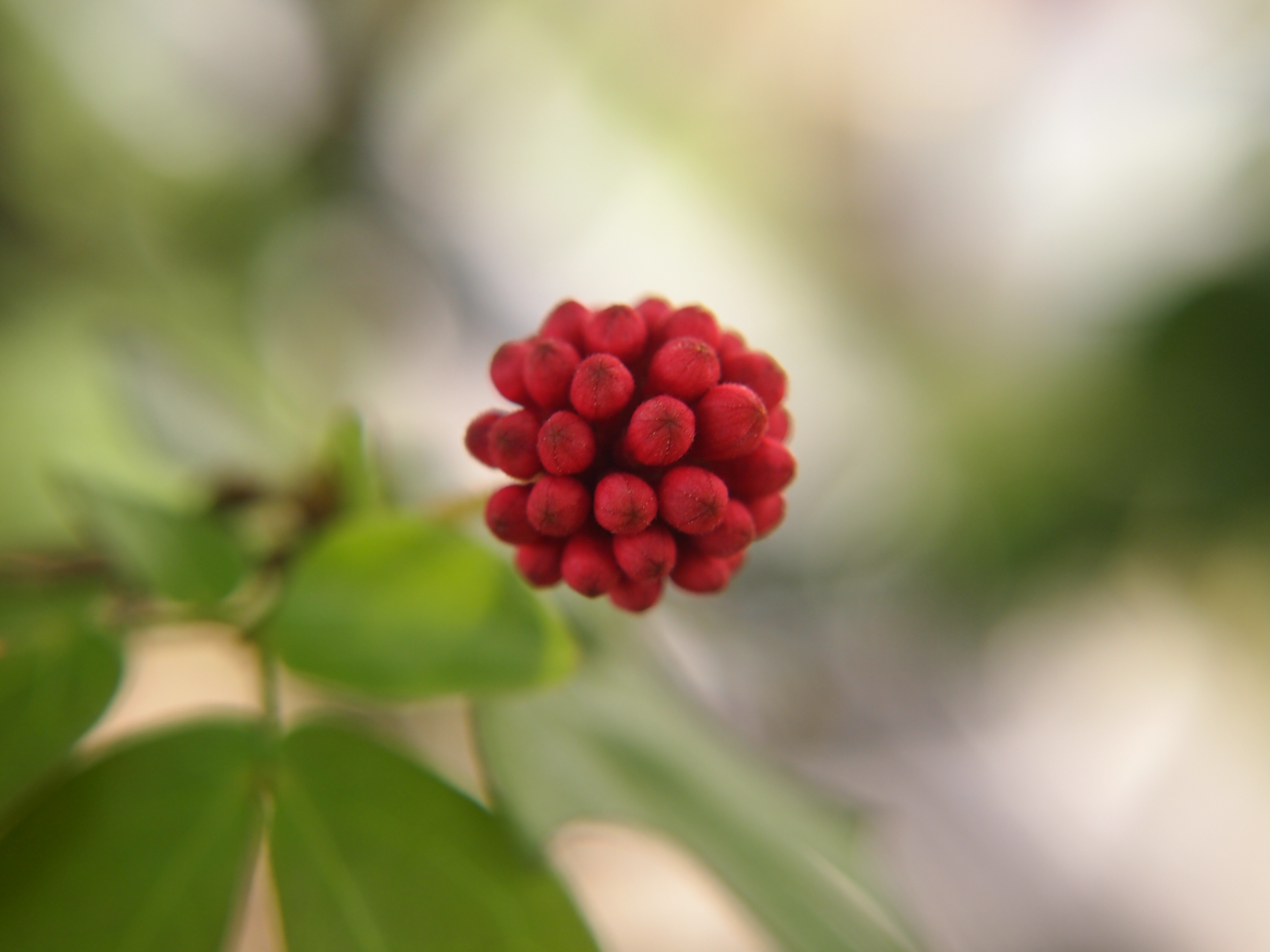
The buds of Calliandra haematocephala grown in Malaysia

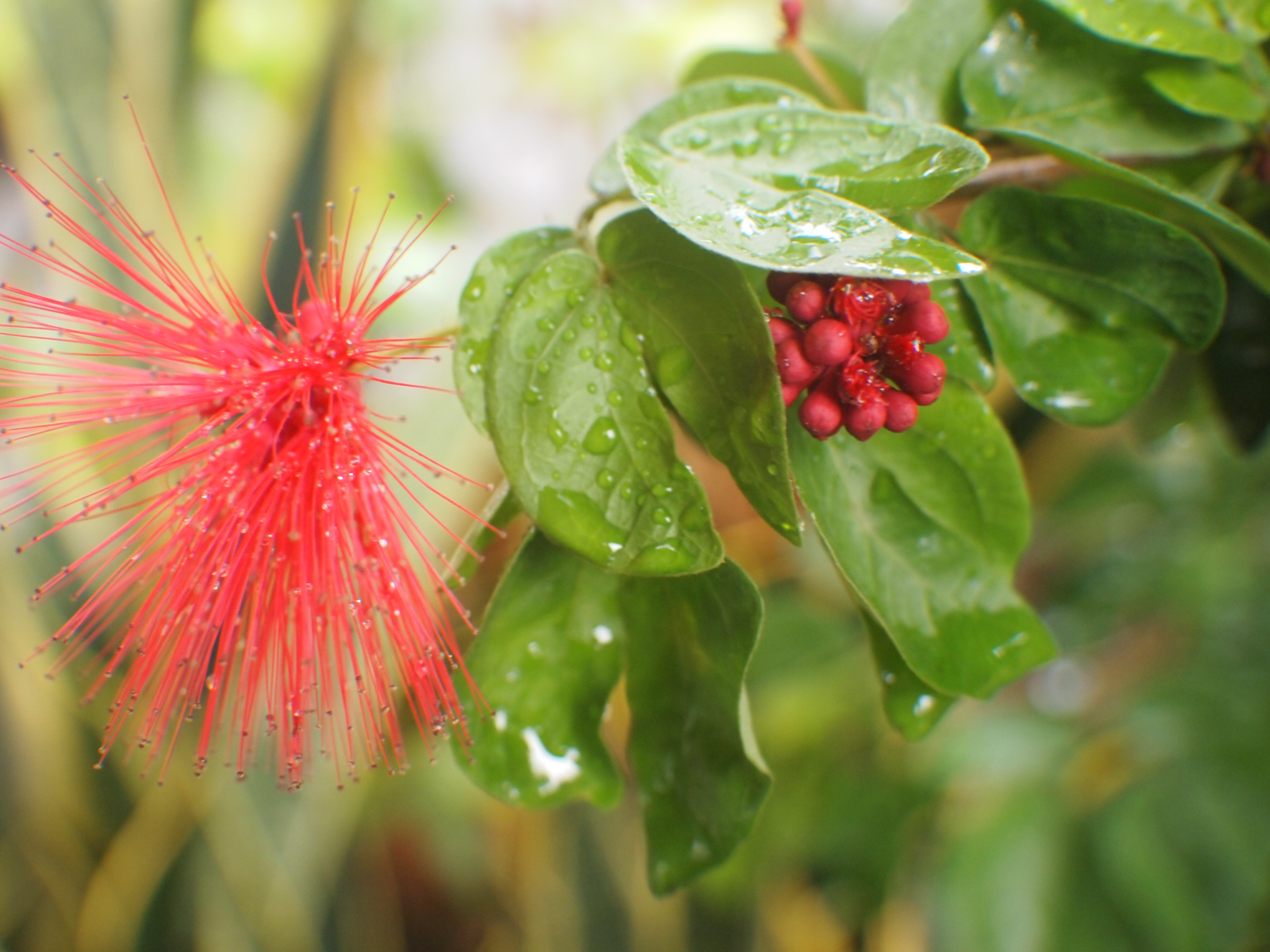
The bud, flower, the branch & leaves.

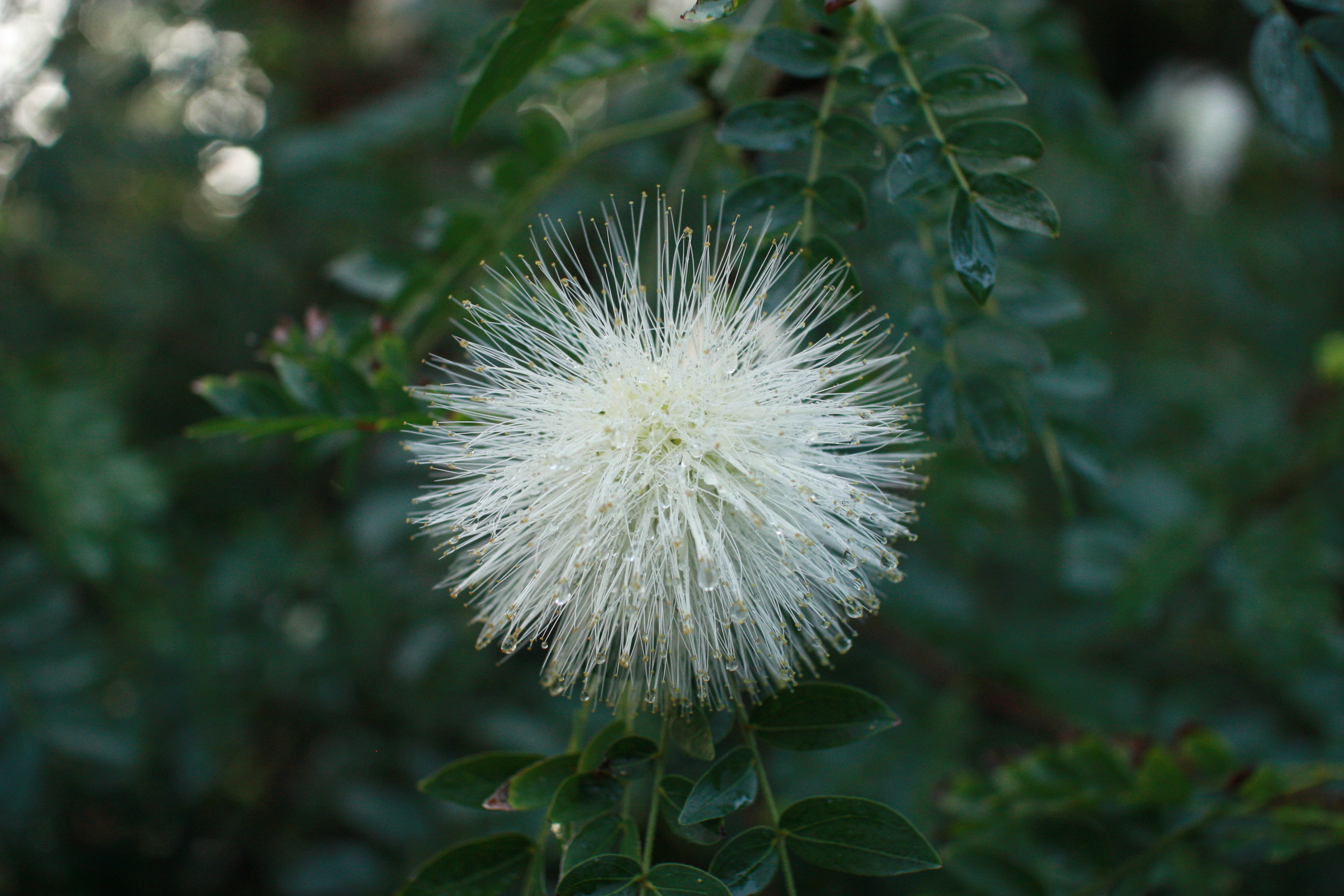
A white flower of the same species

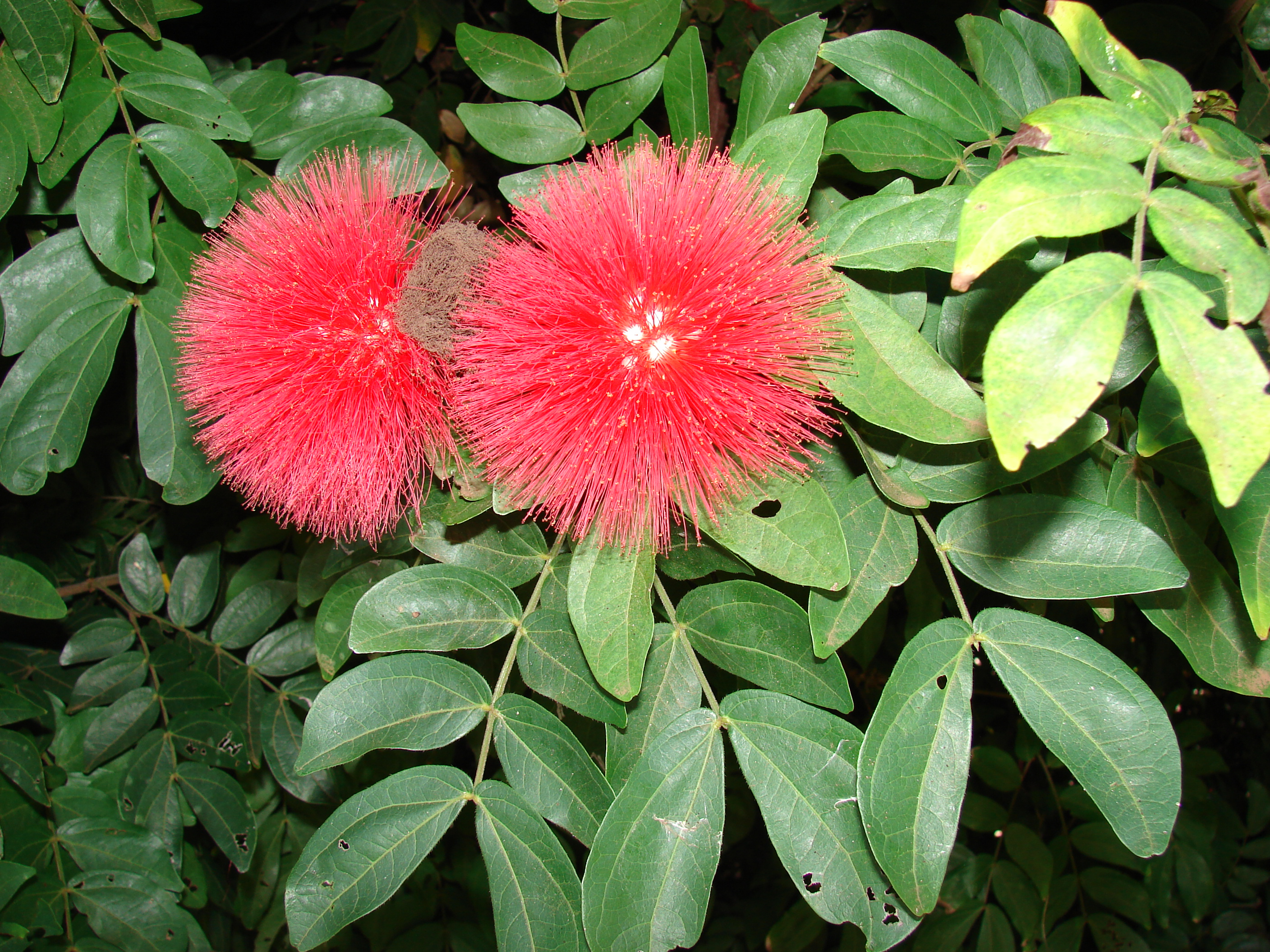
Calliandra haematocephala cultivated in Hawaii, USA
