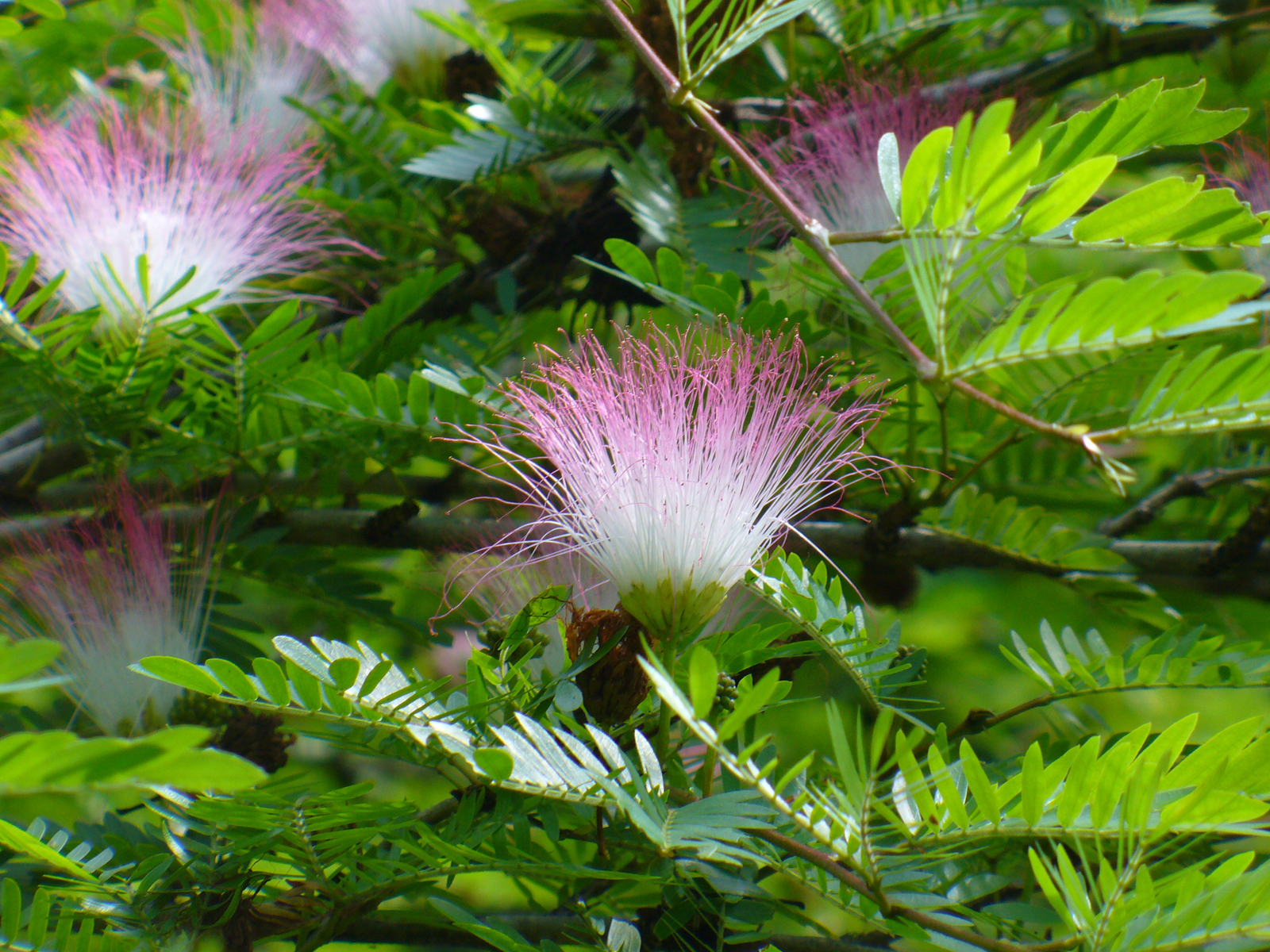

Conservation status
- Least Concern (IUCN 3.1)

Scientific classification
- Kingdom: Plantae
- Clade: Tracheophytes
- Clade: Angiosperms
- Clade: Eudicots
- Clade: Rosids
- Order: Fabales
- Family: Fabaceae
- Subfamily: Caesalpinioideae
- Clade: Mimosoid clade
- Genus: Calliandra
- Species: C. surinamensis

Binomial name
- Calliandra surinamensis Benth.

Synonyms
- Acacia fasciculata (Willd.) Poir.; Anneslia fasciculata (Willd.) Kleinhoonte; Calliandra angustidens Britton & Killip; Calliandra tenuiflora Benth.; Feuilleea fasciculata Kuntze; Inga fasciculata Willd.

= Calliandra surinamensis =

Species of legume

Calliandra surinamensis is a low branching evergreen tropical shrub native to tropical South America that is named after Suriname, a country in northern South America. Common names include Pink powder puff, Pompon De Marin, Surinam powderpuff and Surinamese stickpea.

== Description ==
This highly branched, spreading shrub features silky bipinnate leaves. Each pair of leaflets, or pinnae, are in turn divided into about six pairs of leaflets, pinnules. The plant usually has complexly branched multiple trunks and grows to a height of about 8 meters. Left unpruned it grows long thin branches that eventually droop down onto the ground. The leaves close and droop from dusk until morning when they once again reopen. Leaves are glossy rusty in colour when new, turning to a dark metallic green as they age.

=== Flowers ===
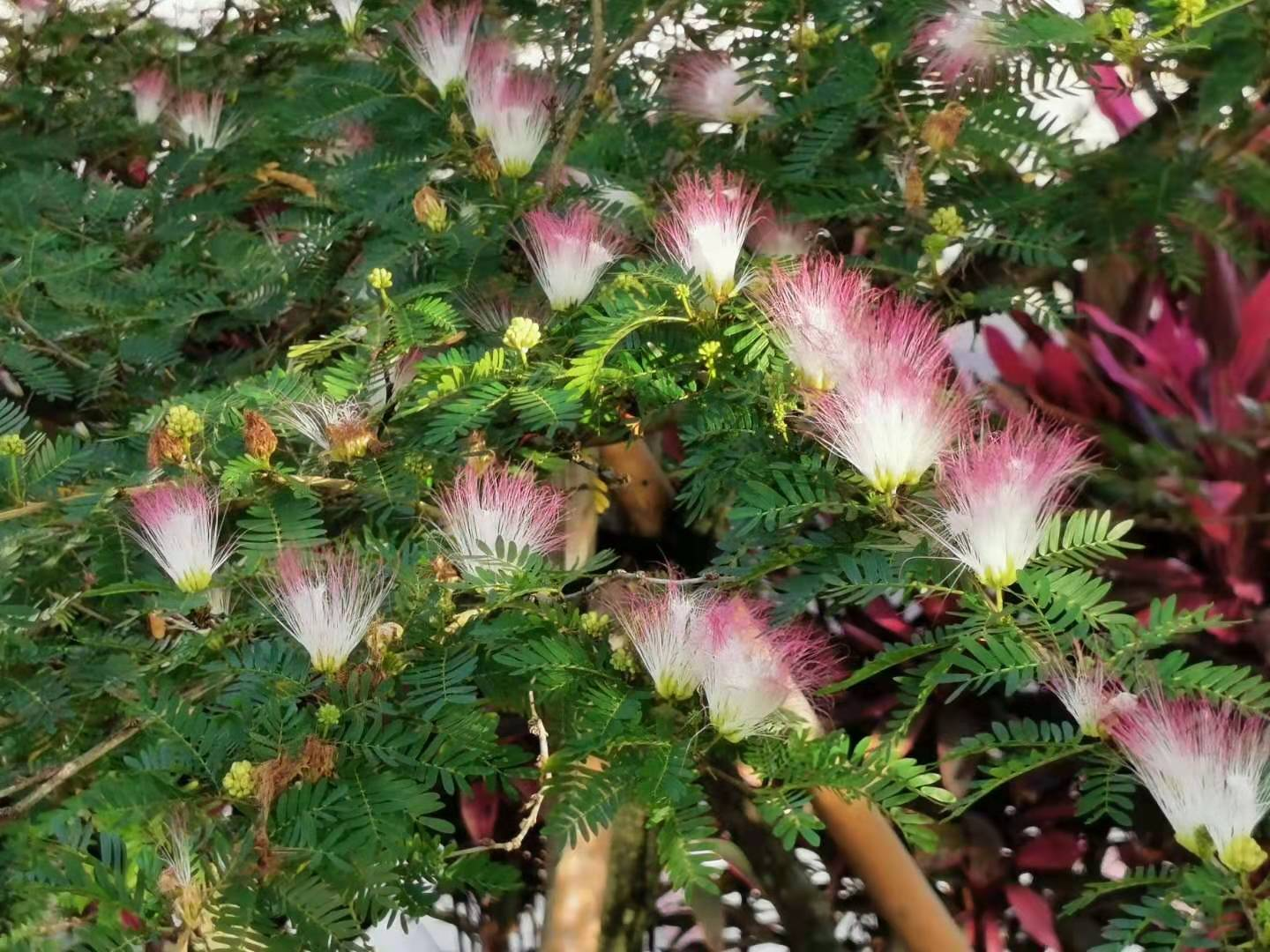
Bunch of flowers

It produces large, showy flower heads that resemble powder puffs or oversized wattle flowers that appear from winter to spring. Although the petals are small, the numerous stamens—white at the base and pink toward the tips—provide most of the colour. The flowers present as globose heads with small green petals and calyx with up to a 100 stamens more or less united into a tube. The stamens are long, hairlike, colourful and protrude well beyond the petals. C. surinamensis flowers all year round with definite more prolific periods. The flowers are short lived and sticky and combined with their quantity give this plant a reputation for making a mess especially on vehicles parked under it.

The numerous colourful stamens are white towards the base and pink towards the top. It is the stamens & anthers that give the flower the appearance of a pink powder puff. The fruit is a 4 centimetres (1.5 in) long pod. The shrub's year round nectar and pollen attracts wildlife such as lorikeets, hummingbirds and fruit bats.

== Distribution ==
The plant is native to northern South America in countries such as, Bolivia, Brazil North, Brazil Northeast, Brazil West-Central, Colombia, Ecuador, French Guiana, Guyana, Peru, Suriname and Venezuela.

== Cultivation ==
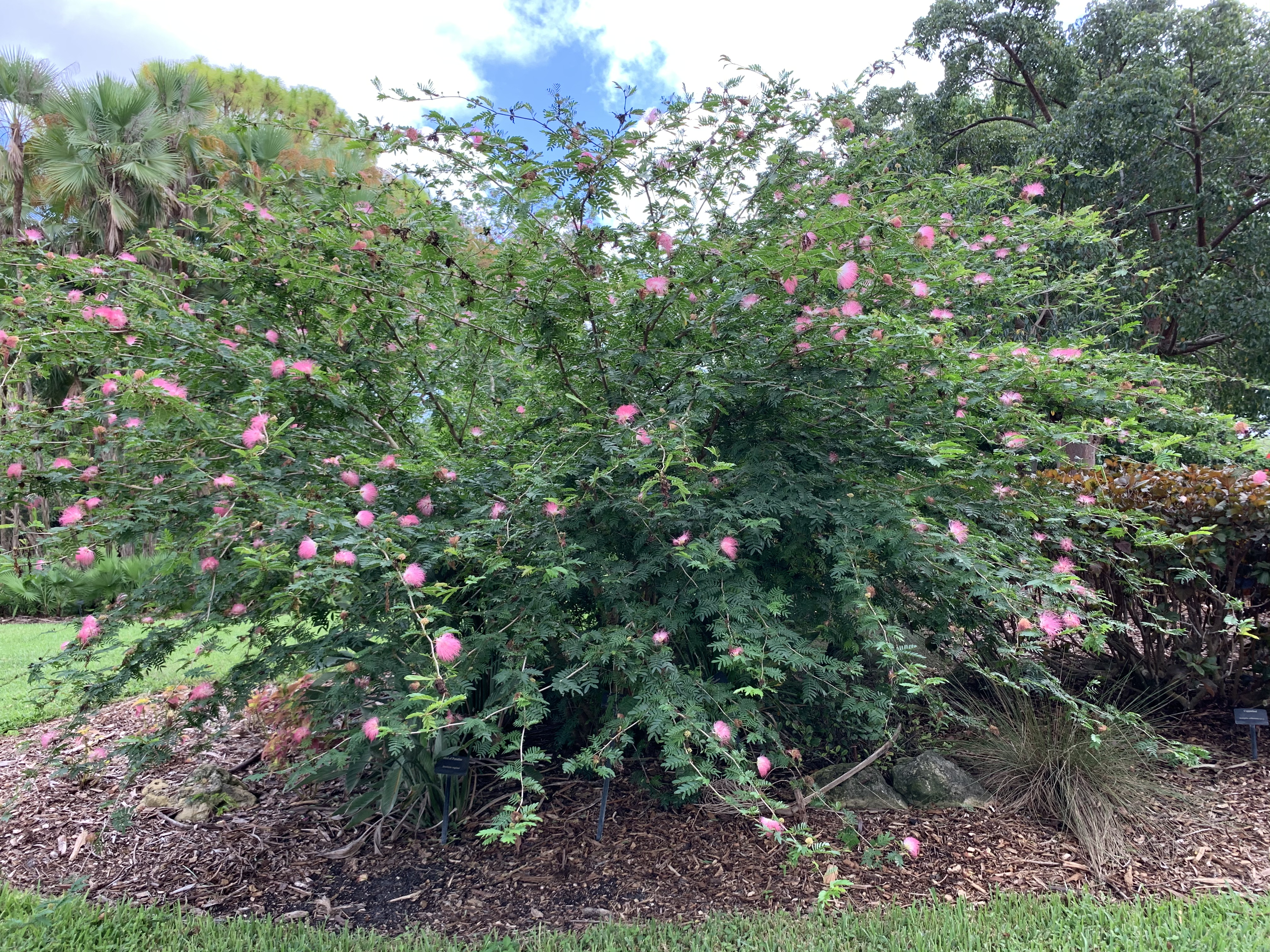
In Mounts Botanical Garden, Florida

In cultivation, Calliandra surinamensis thrives in full sun to partial shade on a range of well‑drained soils, shows high drought tolerance, and once established requires little special care beyond occasional pruning to control its size and shape. The species can be cultivated as a tall (1.5–1.8 m) flowering hedge or as a small specimen tree with lower branches removed. When pruned as a tree, it may reach up to 4.5 m (15 ft) in height, with long, arching branches forming an attractive canopy suitable for patios or container plantings.

According to the University of Florida, it typically has non‑problematic surface roots, offers winter interest due to its distinctive form and persistent fruits, is not considered an outstanding tree, and shows general resistance to pests, with no entries found for invasive potential. It typically develops multiple trunks and low‑branching, drooping branches that are not particularly showy; the bark is thin and may be easily damaged, and occasional pruning is recommended to develop a strong structure. Propagation is by seed or cuttings.

=== Ethnobotany ===
The plant is said to contain lectins which are toxic to cancer cells, although more research is needed. It contains three important compounds: myrectin which contains antioxidant and anti-inflammatory properties, lupeol which contains anti-inflammatory and anti-cancer properties, and ferulic acid which contains antimicrobial properties.

Calliandra surinamensis is widely valued in ethnomedicine. Traditionally, aqueous infusions of the plant have been used to alleviate fever and general weakness. Ethnomedical sources report that it may have anti-inflammatory and mild respiratory‑soothing effects, including relief of cough and minor bronchial ailments. The stem bark is specifically employed in traditional medicine for treating inflammation, infections, coughs, and wounds. Beyond its therapeutic applications, the species is appreciated as an ornamental plant and is occasionally incorporated into agroforestry systems, where its nitrogen-fixing ability contributes to soil fertility. However, compared with other Calliandra species, there is limited scientific evidence supporting many of the medicinal uses suggested by traditional knowledge.

== Gallery ==
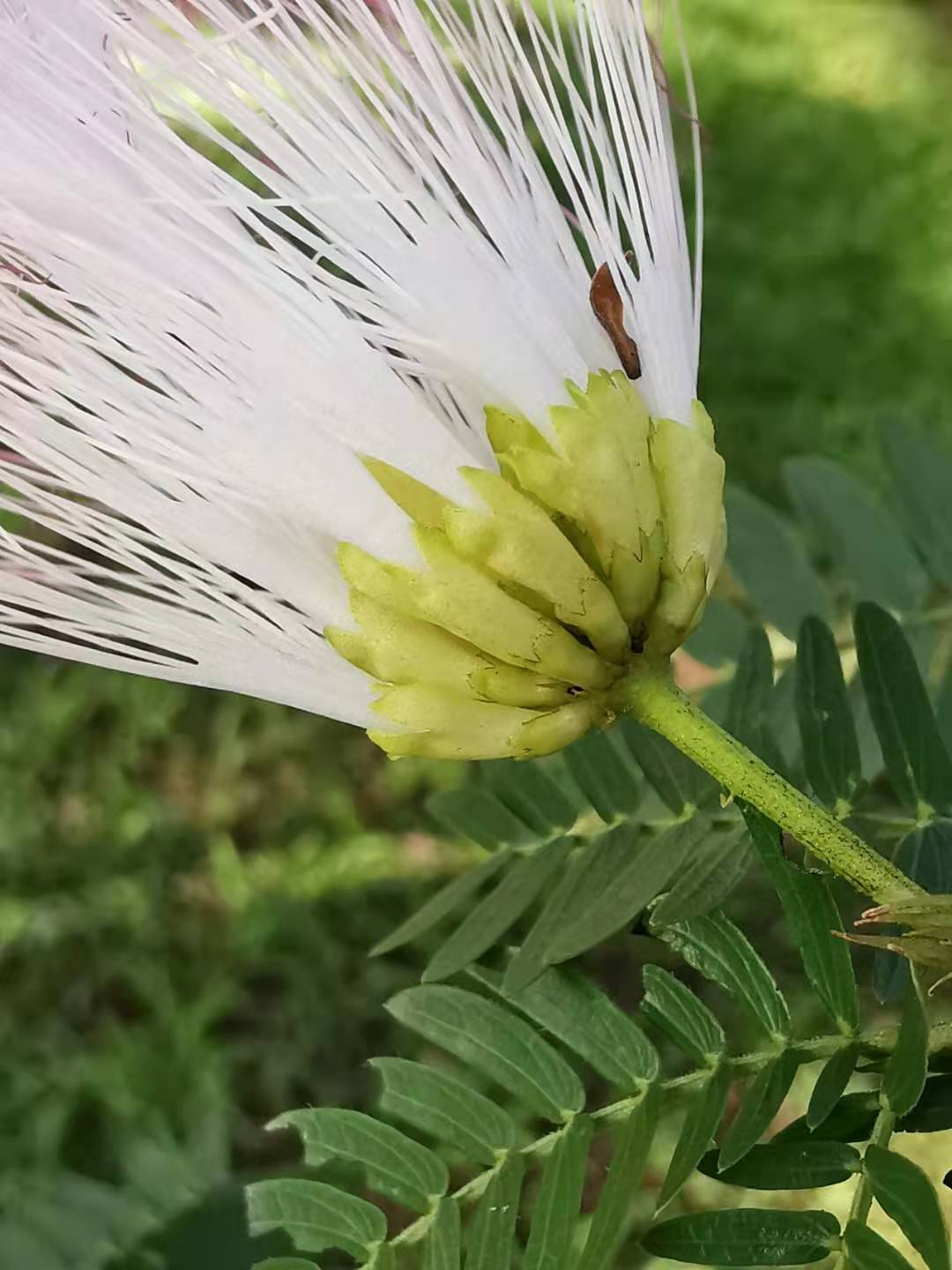
Small green petals and calyx.

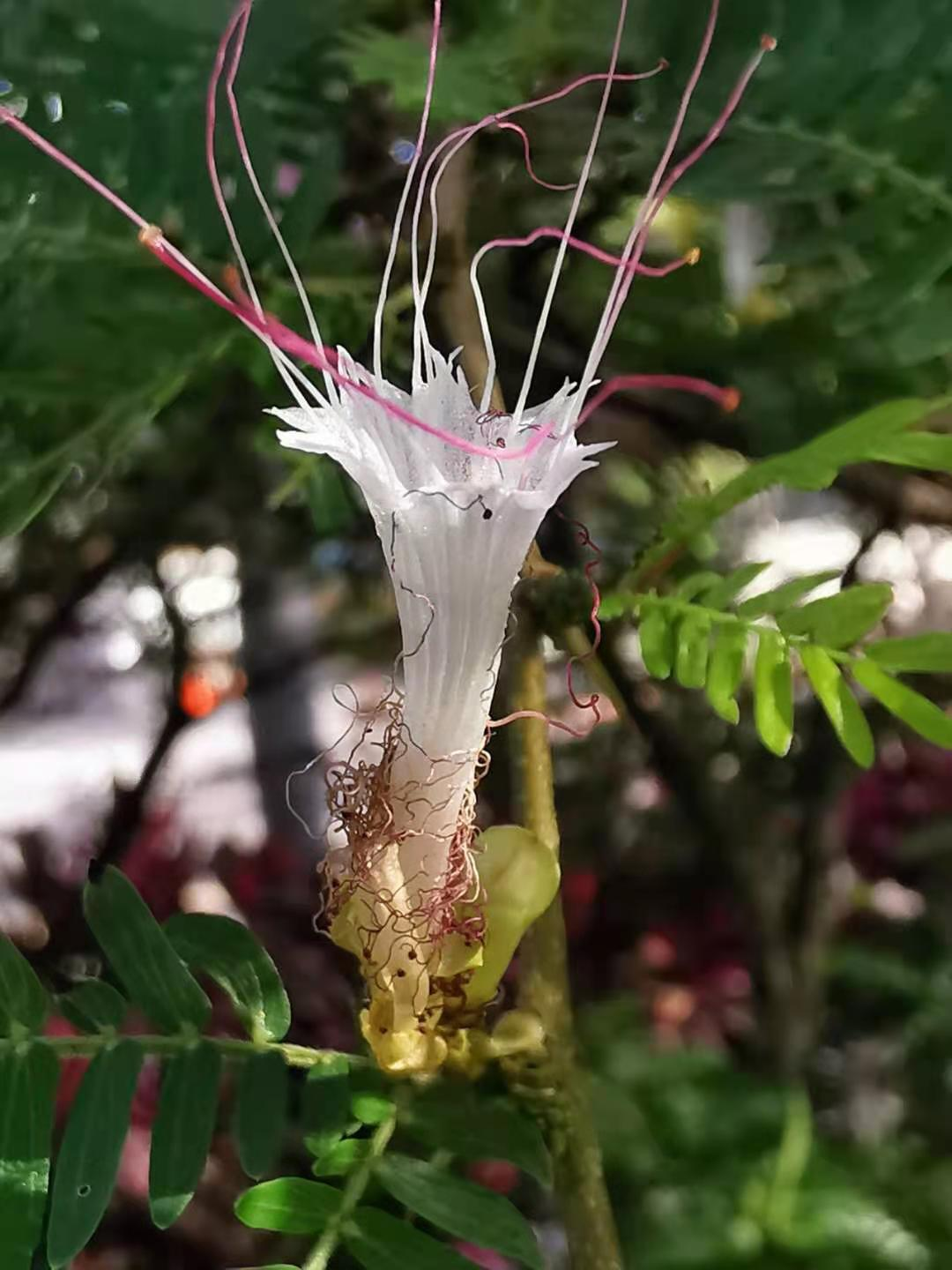
Petalized stamens.

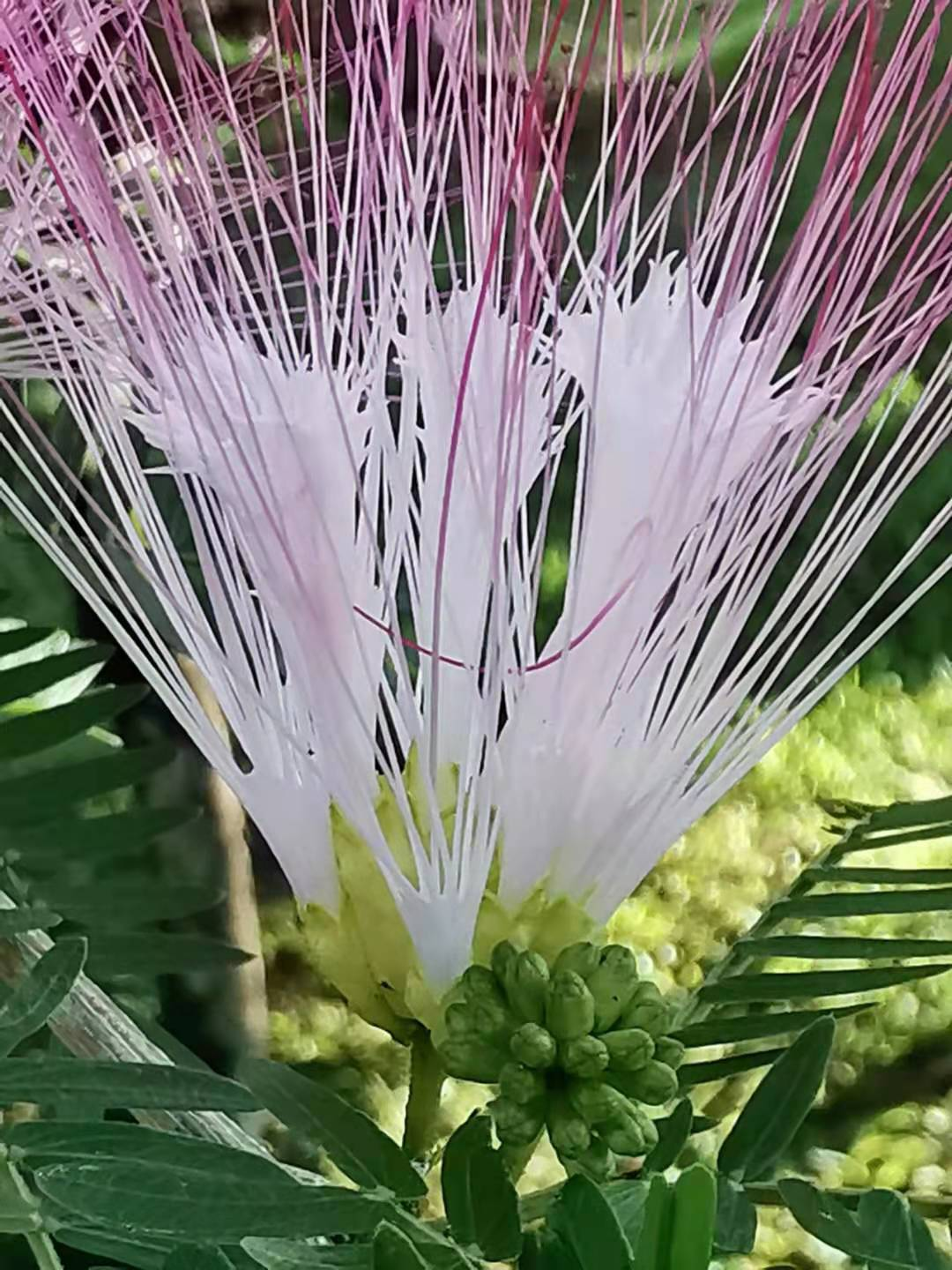
Inflorescence.

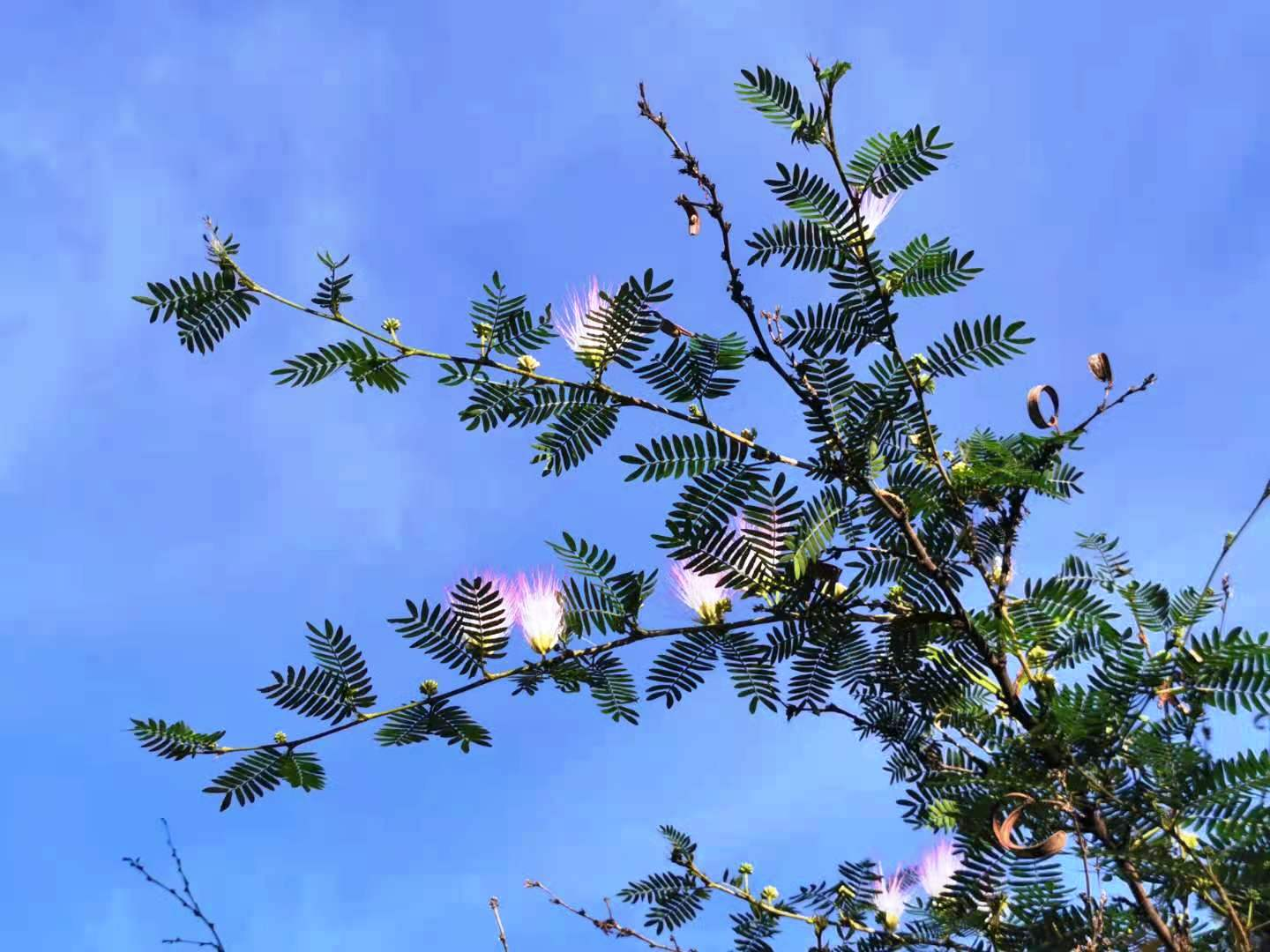
Bipinnate leaves.

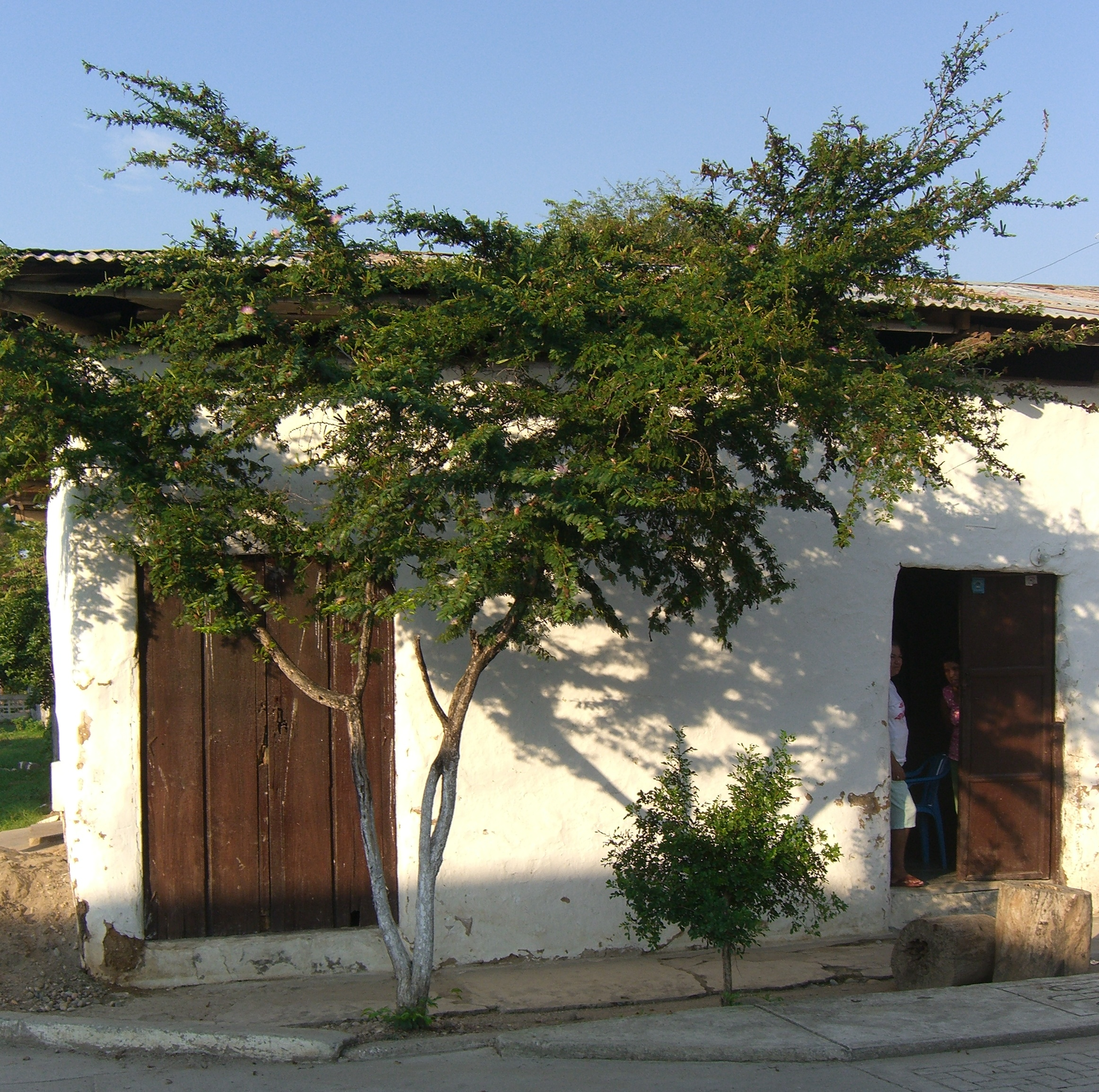
Grown as a tree

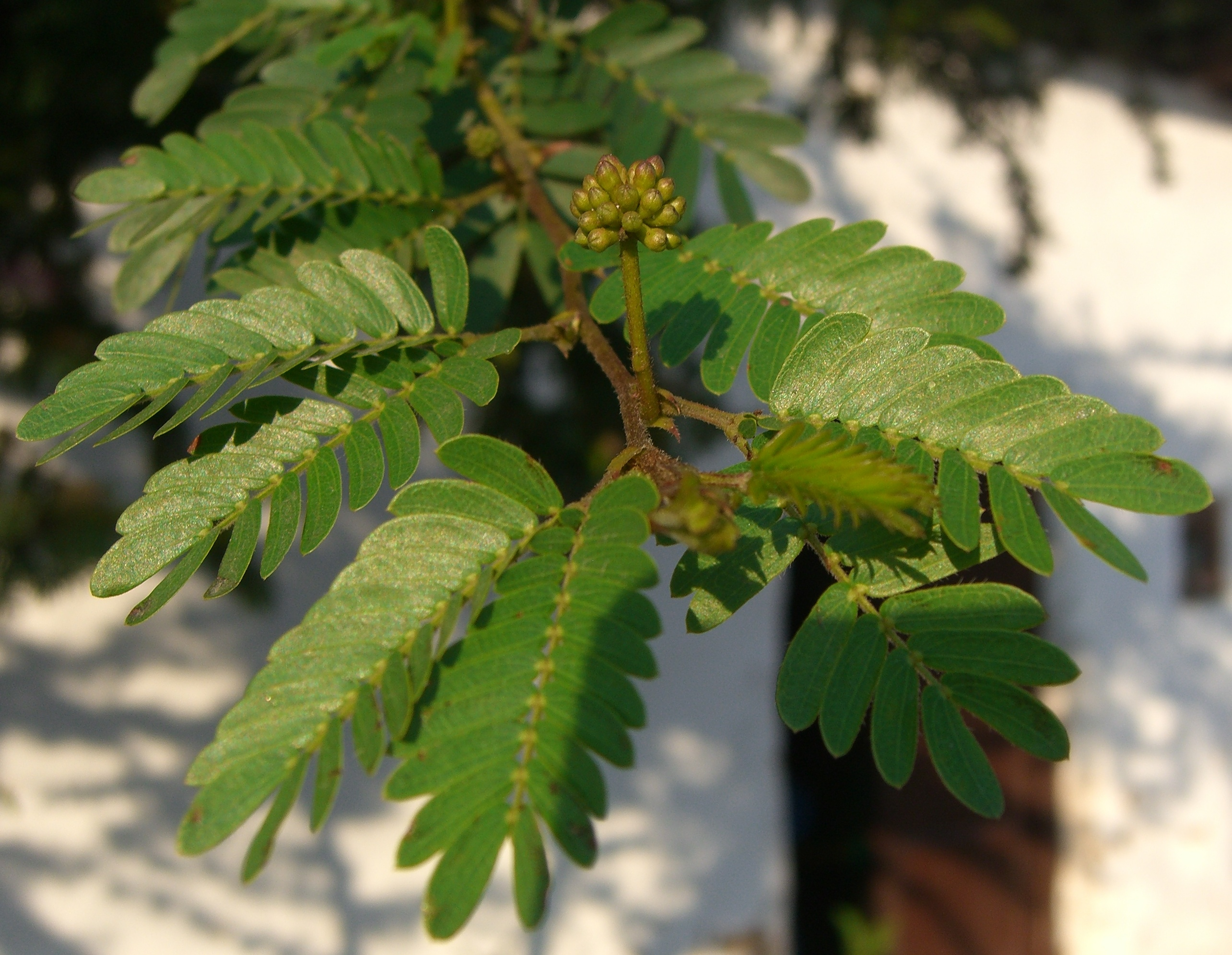
Leaves and buds

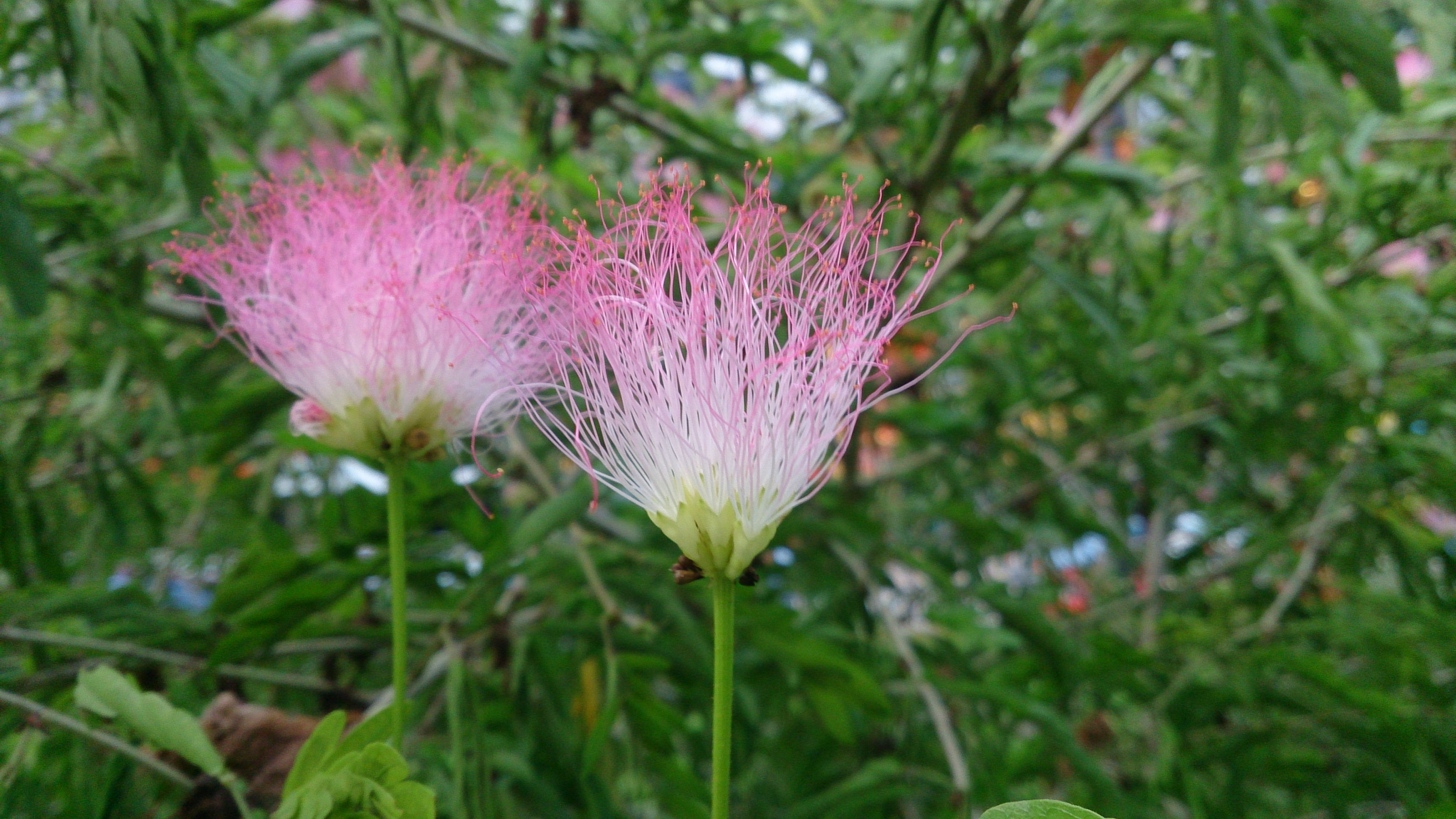
Two light pink flowers

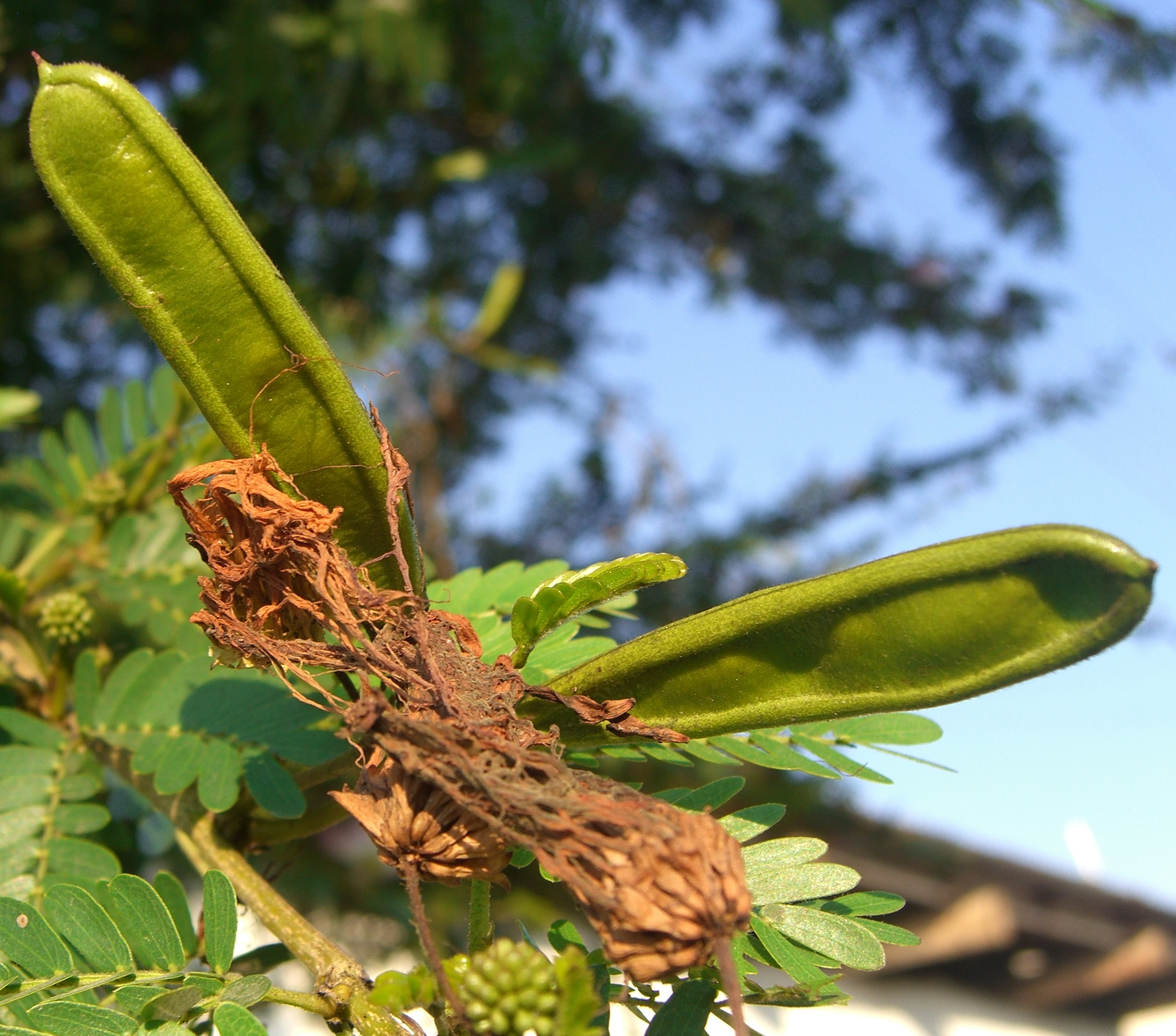
Fruit

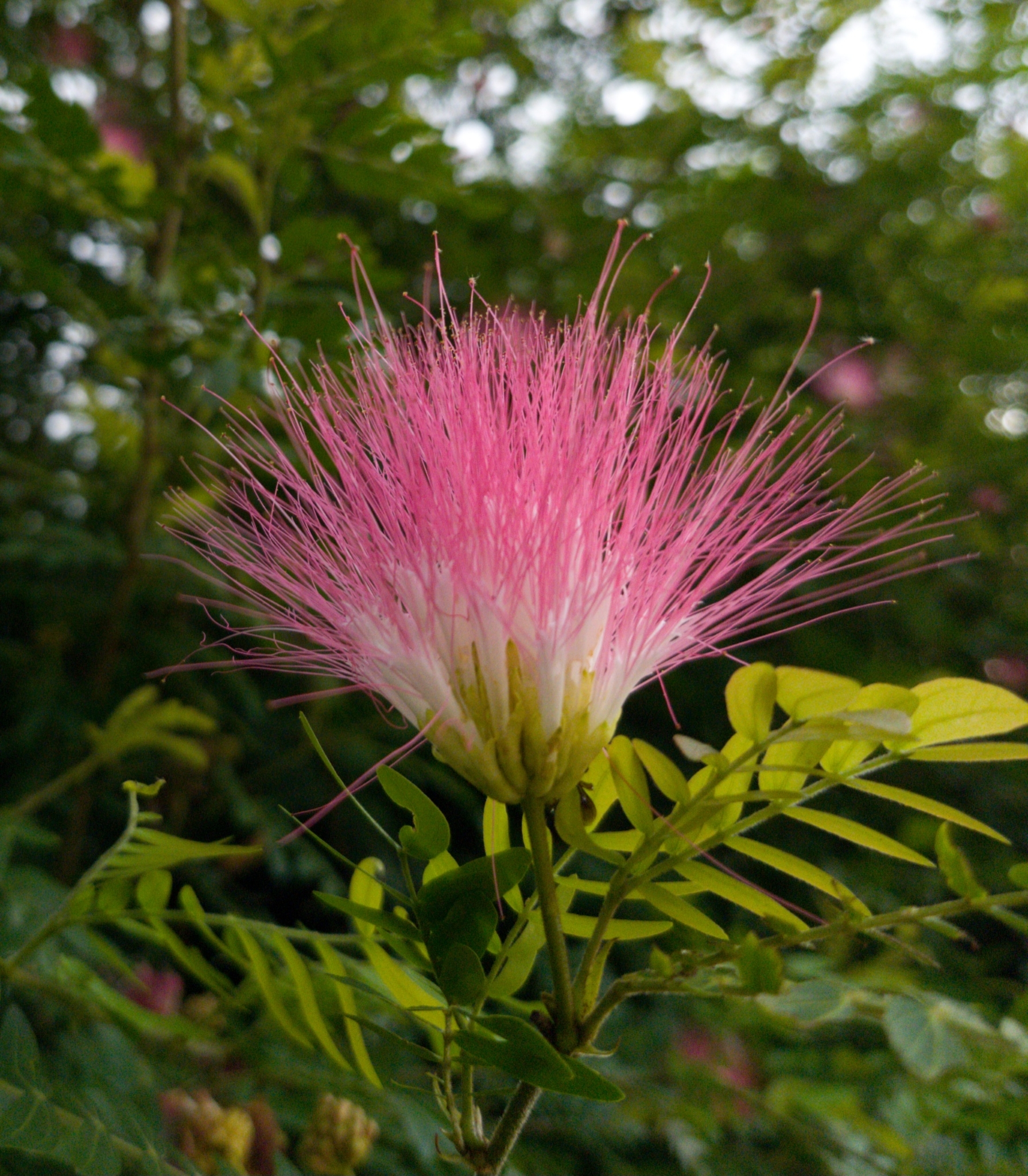
Flower
