= Telangana State Industrial Infrastructure Corporation =

Telangana Industrial Infrastructure Corporation Limited (TGIIC)
- Type: Government
- Industry: Industrial Development
- Founded: 2 June 2014 (12 years ago)
- Headquarters: 6th Floor, Parisrama Bhavan, Basheerbagh, Hyderabad, Telangana, India
- Area served: Telangana
- Key people: Gyadari Balamallu (Chairman) E.V.Narasimha Reddy (Vice Chairman)
- Number of employees: 150
- Website: tgiic.telangana.gov.in

The Telangana Industrial Infrastructure Corporation Limited (TGIIC) is a Government of Telangana initiative for providing infrastructure through the development of industrial areas in the state of Telangana.

TGIIC was established in 2014 for identifying and developing potential growth centres in the state fully equipped with developed plots/sheds, roads, drainage, water, power and other infrastructural facilities;

== Objectives ==
- Industrial Promotion
- Infrastructure Development
- Land Acquisition
- Project Construction

== See also ==
- Financial District, Hyderabad
- Software industry in Telangana
