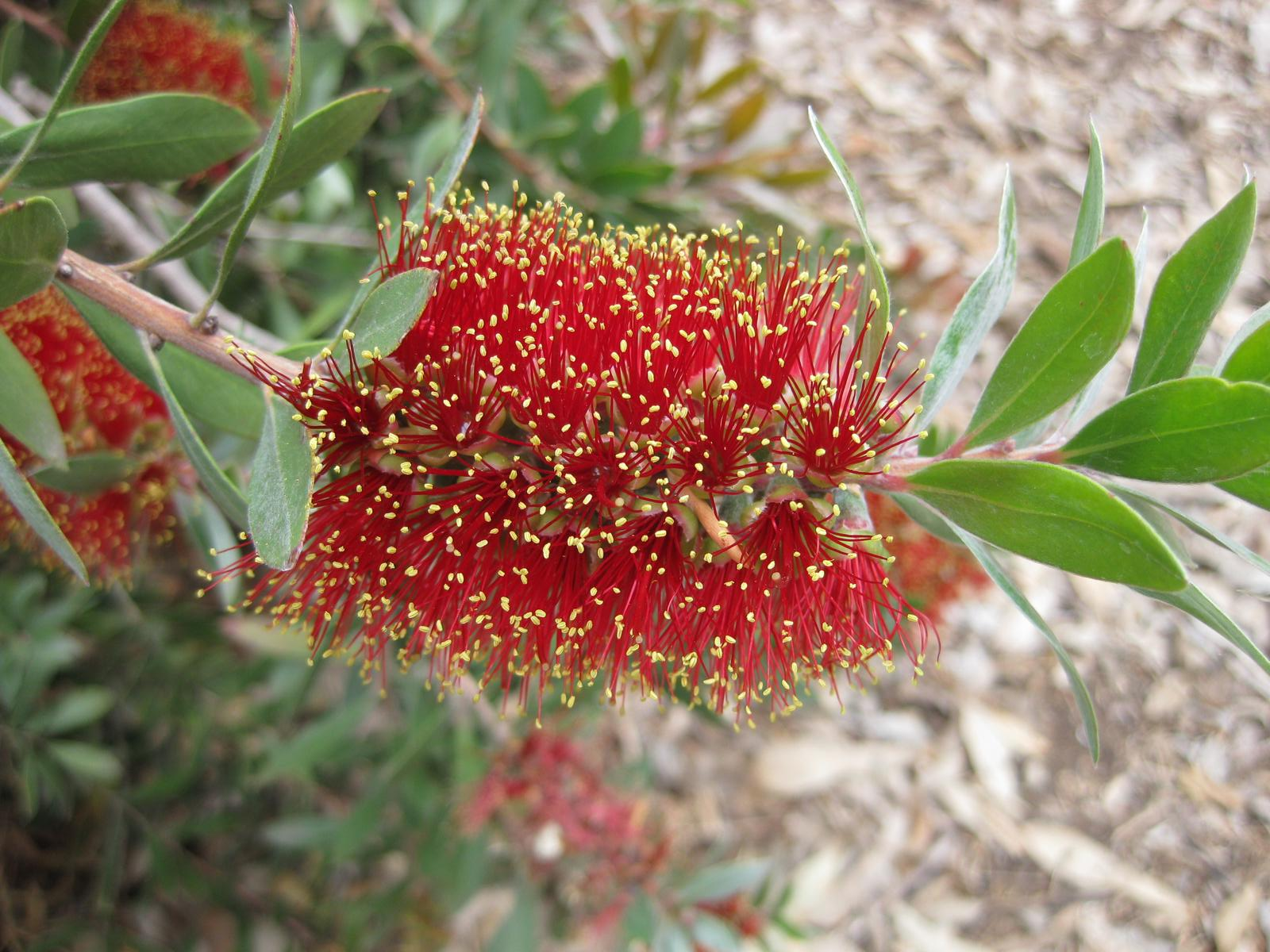

Scientific classification
- Kingdom: Plantae
- Clade: Embryophytes
- Clade: Tracheophytes
- Clade: Spermatophytes
- Clade: Angiosperms
- Clade: Eudicots
- Clade: Rosids
- Order: Myrtales
- Family: Myrtaceae
- Genus: Melaleuca
- Species: M. polandii

Binomial name
- Melaleuca polandii (F.M.Bailey) Craven

Synonyms
- Callistemon polandii F.M.Bailey

= Melaleuca polandii =

Gold-tipped bottlebrush

Species of flowering plant

Melaleuca polandii, commonly known as gold-tipped bottlebrush, is a plant in the myrtle family, Myrtaceae and is endemic a small area in far northern Queensland in Australia. (Some Australian state herbaria continue to use the name Callistemon polandii.) It is a dense shrub with bronze-coloured, hairy new growth and spikes of red flowers tipped with yellow.

== Description ==
Melaleuca polandii is a shrub growing to 4 m (10 ft) high. Its leaves are arranged alternately and are 63–129 mm (2–5 in) long, 16–35 mm (0.6–1 in) wide, flat, narrow egg-shaped and tapering to a point. The leaves have a distinct mid-vein and 19 to 25 lateral veins. The young leaves and branches are covered with fine, silky hairs.

The flowers are bright red and are arranged in spikes on the ends of branches that continue to grow after flowering and sometimes in the upper leaf axils. The spikes are 50–60 mm (2.0–2.4 in) in diameter. The petals are 3.6–5.3 mm (0.1–0.2 in) long, fall off as the flower ages and there are 35-50 stamens in each flower. Flowering occurs from late winter to summer, sometimes in other months and is followed by fruit that are woody capsules, 4.6–6.5 mm (0.2–0.3 in) long.

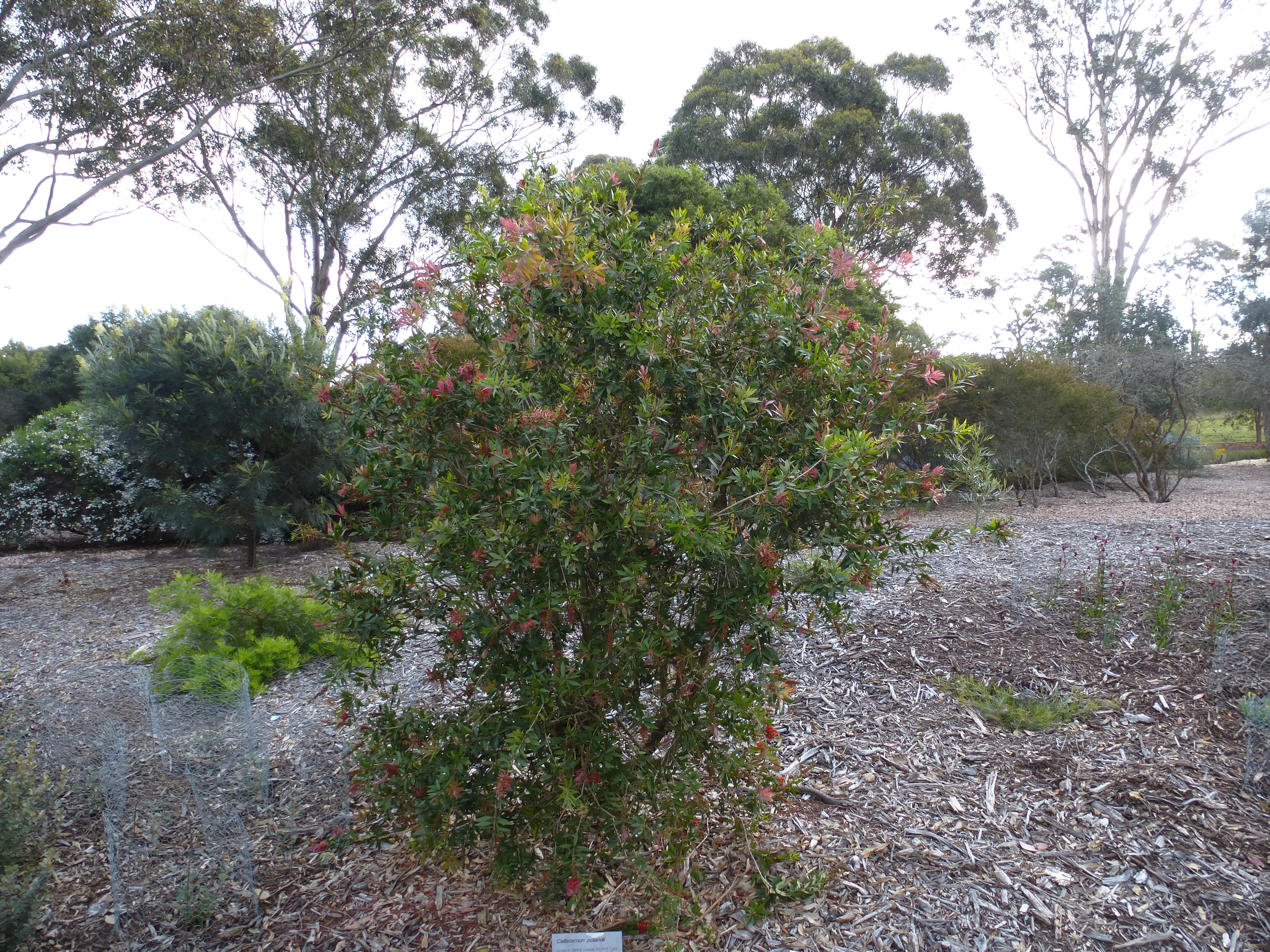
Habit in the Australian Botanic Garden Mount Annan

== Taxonomy and naming ==
Melaleuca polandii was first named in 2006 by Lyndley Craven in Novon when Callistemon polandii was transferred to the present genus. Callistemon polandii was first formally described in 1902 by Frederick Manson Bailey from a specimen collected in "Bloomfield River [by] Rev. W. Poland". The specific epithet (polandii) honours Wilhelm Poland, a missionary at Wujal Wujal (formerly the Bloomfield River Mission).

Callistemon polandii is regarded as a synonym of Melaleuca polandii by the Royal Botanic Gardens, Kew.

== Distribution and habitat ==
This melaleuca occurs in the Cape Flattery and Cooktown districts of Queensland where it grows in dense wallum heath in sandy or peaty soils.

== Use in horticulture ==
Melaleuca polandii is a hardy shrub, suitable for warm coastal areas. It is useful as a screen or hedge but is known to damage wastewater pipes.
