= Soymida =

Scientific classification
- Kingdom: Plantae
- Clade: Tracheophytes
- Clade: Angiosperms
- Clade: Eudicots
- Clade: Rosids
- Order: Sapindales
- Family: Meliaceae
- Genus: Soymida; A.Juss.
- Species: S. febrifuga

Binomial name
- Soymida febrifuga (Roxb.) A.Juss.

Genus of plants

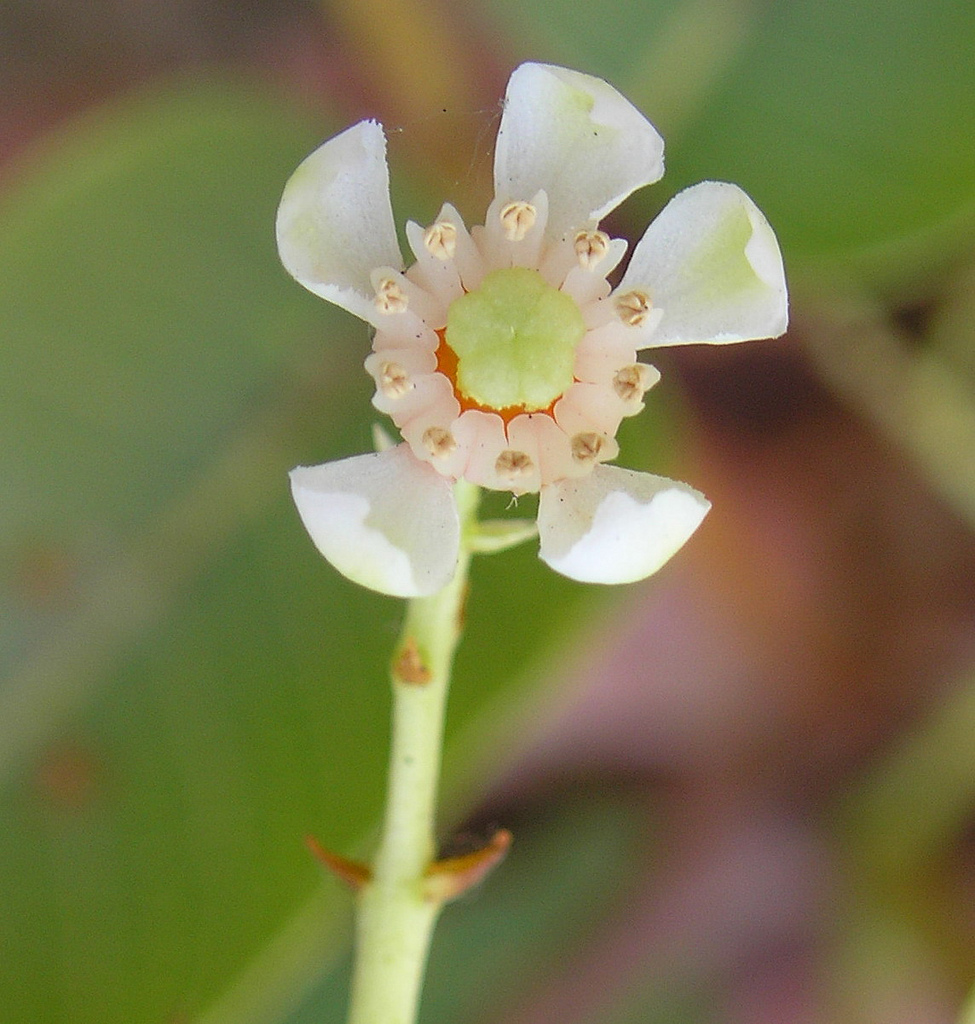
A photograph of a Soymida febrifuga.

Soymida is a genus of flowering plants belonging to the family Meliaceae. It is found on the Indian subcontinent and Myanmar. It contains a single species, Soymida febrifuga.
