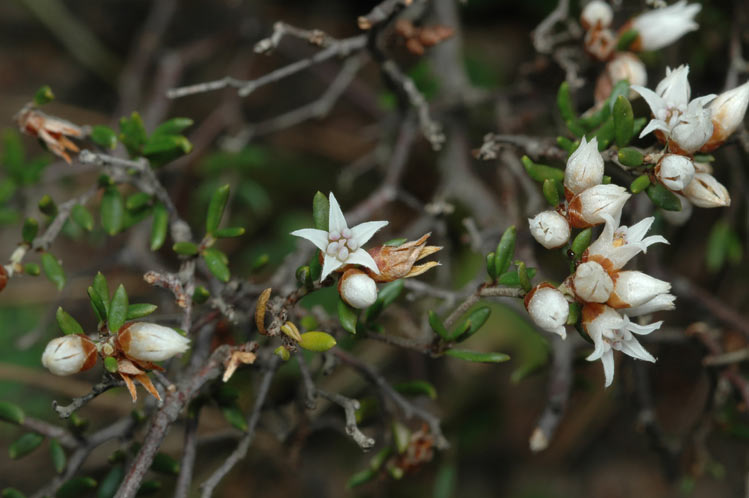
- In the Eurobodalla Regional Botanic Gardens

Scientific classification
- Kingdom: Plantae
- Clade: Tracheophytes
- Clade: Angiosperms
- Clade: Eudicots
- Clade: Rosids
- Order: Rosales
- Family: Rhamnaceae
- Genus: Cryptandra
- Species: C. propinqua

Binomial name
- Cryptandra propinqua A.Cunn. ex Fenzl

= Cryptandra propinqua =

Species of flowering plant

Cryptandra propinqua is a species of flowering plant in the family Rhamnaceae and is endemic to south-eastern continental Australia. It is a shrub with many branches, more or less linear leaves, and spike-like clusters of white, tube-shaped flowers.

== Description ==
Cryptandra propinqua is a shrub that typically grows to a height of 0.6–1 m (2 ft 0 in – 3 ft 3 in) and has many side branchlets 10–30 cm (3.9–11.8 in) long but that are not spiny. The leaves are linear, flat or round in cross-section, 2–10 mm (0.079–0.394 in) long, 1–2 mm (0.039–0.079 in) wide on a petiole 0.2–0.3 mm (0.0079–0.0118 in) long, and often clustered. There are narrowly triangular stipules 1.0–1.5 mm (0.039–0.059 in) long and fused at the base of the petioles. The edges of the leaves are rolled under, sometimes obscuring the lower, densely hairy, white surface, the upper surface glabrous. The flowers are borne singly in upper leaf axils forming a spike-like cluster with about 15 egg-shaped bracts at the base of each flower. The floral tube is white, bell-shaped, 2.0–2.3 mm (0.079–0.091 in) long, the lobes erect, 1.8–2.7 mm (0.071–0.106 in) long. The petals are white, protrude slightly beyond the end of the floral tube, and are hooded. Flowering mainly occurs from June to September.

== Taxonomy and naming ==
Cryptandra propinqua was first formally described in 1837 by Eduard Fenzl in Enumeratio plantarum quas in Novae Hollandiae ora austro-occidentali ad fluvium Cygnorum et in sinu Regis Georgii collegit Carolus Liber Baro de Hügel from an unpublished description by Allan Cunningham. The specific epithet (propinqua) means "near" or "related to".

In 2007, Jürgen Kellermann and Frank Udovicic described two subspecies of C. propinqua in the Proceedings of the Linnean Society of New South Wales, and the names are accepted by the Australian Plant Census:

- Cryptandra propinqua subsp. maranoa Kellermann & Udovicic has leaves with the lower surface usually visible, mostly glabrous stipules, bracts not covering the sepals and occurs in New South Wales and Queensland.
- Cryptandra propinqua A.Cunn. ex Fenzl subsp. propinqua has leaves with the lower surface obscured, stipules hairy, at least on the midrib, and fragile bracts partly covering the sepals and is restricted to the Maranoa and nearby districts of Queensland.

== Distribution and habitat ==
This cryptandra grows in sandy soil over sandstone, and is widespread between Springsure, Inglewood and Morven in Queensland, mainly on the ranges and inland in New South Wales, and in southern South Australia.
