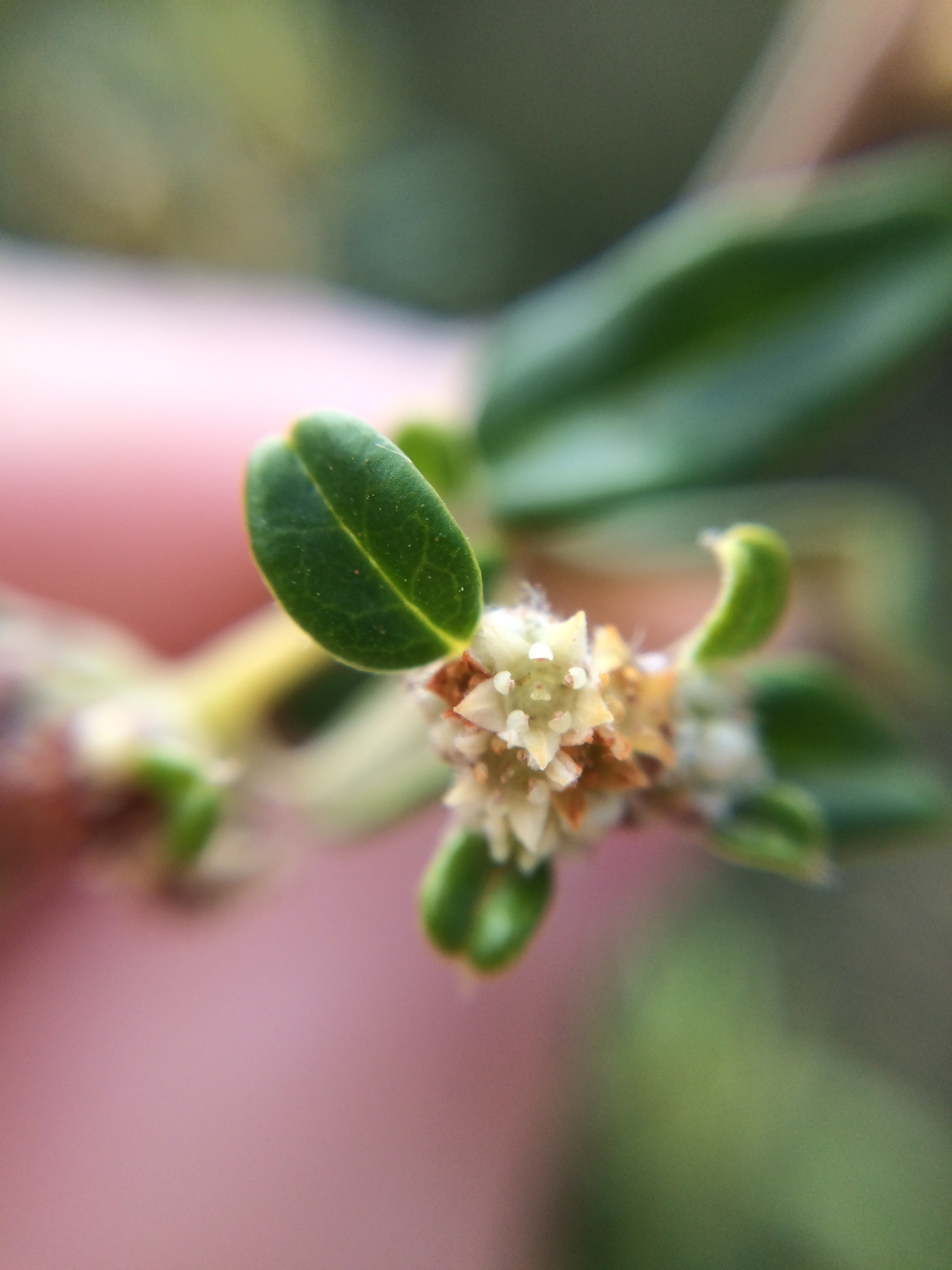

Scientific classification
- Kingdom: Plantae
- Clade: Tracheophytes
- Clade: Angiosperms
- Clade: Eudicots
- Clade: Rosids
- Order: Rosales
- Family: Rhamnaceae
- Genus: Spyridium
- Species: S. majoranifolium

Binomial name
- Spyridium majoranifolium (Fenzl) Rye

Synonyms
- List: Pomaderris commixta Steud.; Pomaderris subretusa Steud.; Spyridium spadiceum var. calvescens Benth. nom. illeg., nom. superfl.; Spyridium spadiceum var. majoranaefolium Benth. orth. var.; Spyridium spadiceum var. majoranifolium (Fenzl) Benth.; Trymalium majoranaefolium var. calvescens Reissek orth. var.; Trymalium majoranaefolium var. velutinum Reissek orth. var.; Trymalium majoranifolium Fenzl; Trymalium majoranifolium var. calvescens Reissek; Trymalium majoranifolium Fenzl var. majoranifolium; Trymalium majoranifolium var. velutinum Reissek

= Spyridium majoranifolium =

Species of shrub

Spyridium majoranifolium is a species of flowering plant in the family Rhamnaceae and is endemic to the south of Western Australia. It is a shrub that typically grows to a height of 0.1–1.6 m (3.9 in – 5 ft 3.0 in) and has white to cream-coloured or yellow flowers from February to October. It grows on coastal dunes and stony hillsides in near-coastal areas in the Esperance Plains, Jarrah Forest and Warren bioregions of southern Western Australia.

This spyridium was first formally described in 1837 by Eduard Fenzl who gave it the name Trymalium majoranifolium in Enumeratio plantarum quas in Novae Hollandiae ora austro-occidentali ad fluvium Cygnorum et in sinu Regis Georgii collegit Carolus Liber Baro de Hügel from specimens collected by Ferdinand Bauer. In 1995, Barbara Lynette Rye changed the name to Spyridium majoranifolium in the journal Nuytsia. The specific epithet (majoranifolium) means "marjoram-leaved".
