= Myrtella =

Scientific classification
- Kingdom: Plantae
- Clade: Tracheophytes
- Clade: Angiosperms
- Clade: Eudicots
- Clade: Rosids
- Order: Myrtales
- Family: Myrtaceae
- Subfamily: Myrtoideae
- Tribe: Myrteae
- Genus: Myrtella; F.Muell.

Synonyms
- Saffordiella Merr.

Genus of flowering plants in the myrtle family

Myrtella is a genus of plants in the Myrtaceae described as a genus in 1877. It is native to New Guinea and to some islands of the western Pacific.

Accepted species

1. Myrtella beccarii F.Muell. – New Guinea, Solomon Islands
2. Myrtella bennigseniana (Volkens) Diels – New Guinea, Caroline Islands, Mariana Islands

Formerly included

now classified in other genera: Kania, Lithomyrtus, Uromyrtus

1. Myrtella cordata – Lithomyrtus cordata
2. Myrtella hirsutula – Kania hirsutula
3. Myrtella microphylla – Lithomyrtus microphylla
4. Myrtella obtusa – Lithomyrtus obtusa
5. Myrtella phebalioides – Lithomyrtus retusa
6. Myrtella retusa – Lithomyrtus retusa
7. Myrtella rostrata – Uromyrtus rostrata
