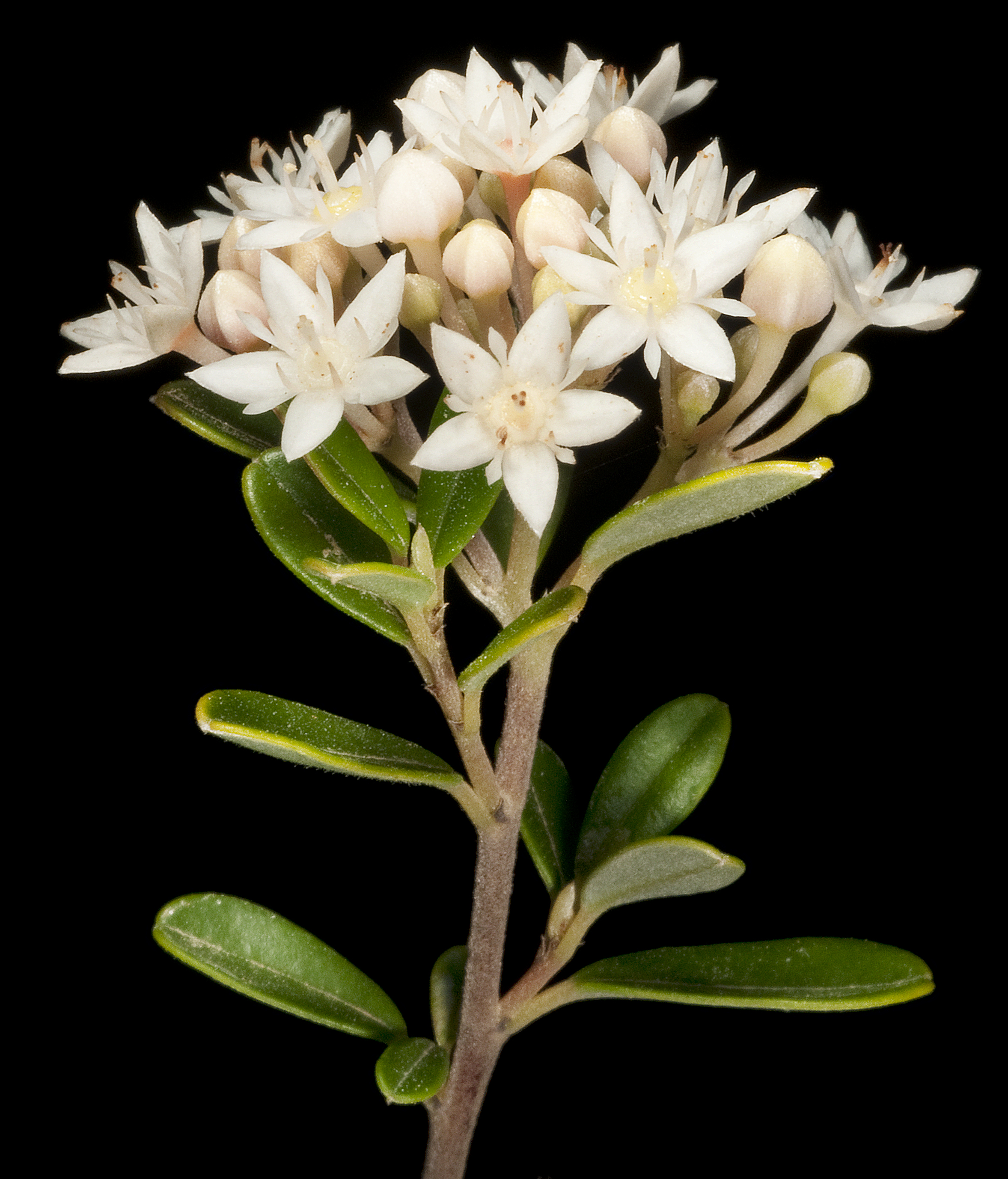

Scientific classification
- Kingdom: Plantae
- Clade: Tracheophytes
- Clade: Angiosperms
- Clade: Eudicots
- Clade: Rosids
- Order: Rosales
- Family: Rhamnaceae
- Genus: Pomaderris
- Species: P. myrtilloides

Binomial name
- Pomaderris myrtilloides Fenzl

= Pomaderris myrtilloides =

Species of plant

Pomaderris myrtilloides is a species of flowering plant in the family Rhamnaceae and is endemic to near-coastal areas of southern Western Australia. It is an erect shrub with many branches, narrowly egg-shaped elliptic or wedge-shaped leaves with the narrower end towards the base, and cream-coloured to pale pink flowers.

== Description ==
Pomaderris myrtilloides is an erect shrub that typically grows to a height of 0.3–2 m (1 ft 0 in – 6 ft 7 in). The leaves are elliptic, wedge-shaped, or egg-shaped with the narrower end towards the base, 10–26 mm (0.39–1.02 in) long and 7–15 mm (0.28–0.59 in) wide with narrowly triangular stipules 1–4 mm (0.039–0.157 in) long at the base but that fall off as the leaf develops. The upper surface of the leaves is more or less glabrous and the lower surface is covered with minute, star-shaped hairs. The flowers are cream-coloured to pale pink and are borne in groups 15–35 mm (0.59–1.38 in) wide, each flower on a pedicel 3–8 mm (0.12–0.31 in) long. The sepals are 2–3 mm (0.079–0.118 in) long and the petals narrowly lance-shaped and 1.3–2 mm (0.051–0.079 in) long. Flowering mainly occurs from July to October and the fruit is an oval capsule 4.0–4.5 mm (0.16–0.18 in) long.

== Taxonomy ==
Pomaderris myrtilloides was first formally described in 1837 by Eduard Fenzl in Enumeratio plantarum quas in Novae Hollandiae ora austro-occidentali ad fluvium Cygnorum et in sinu Regis Georgii collegit Carolus Liber Baro de Hügel from specimens collected by Ferdinand Bauer. The specific epithet (myrtilloides) means "myrtillus-like", referring to a similarity to Vaccinium myrtillus.

== Distribution and habitat ==
This pomaderris grows in near-coastal vegetation on limestone ridges or deep sand on dunes between Albany and Eucla in the south of Western Australia.

== Conservation status ==
Pomaderris myrtilloides is listed as "not threatened" by the Government of Western Australia Department of Biodiversity, Conservation and Attractions.
