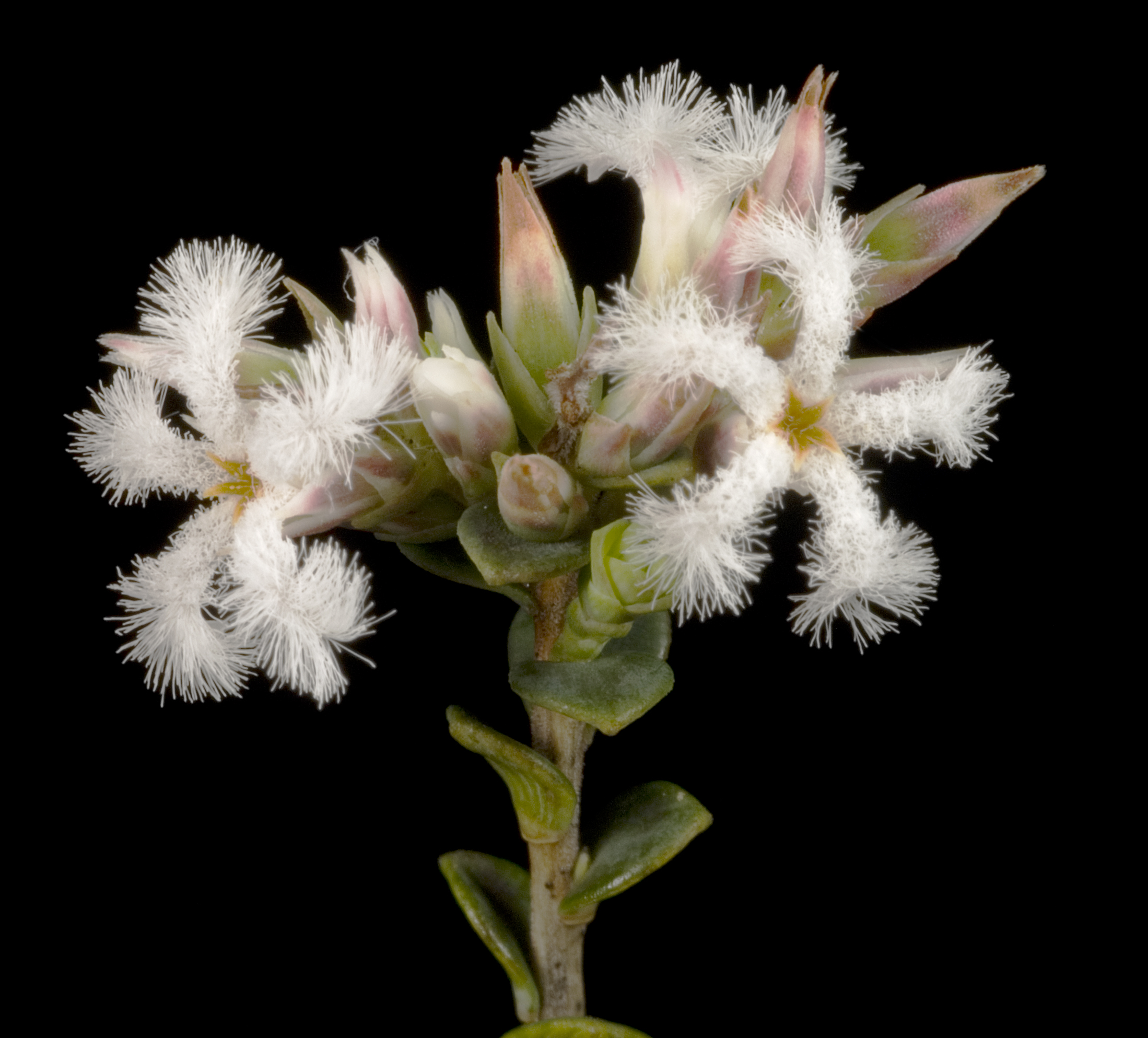

Scientific classification
- Kingdom: Plantae
- Clade: Tracheophytes
- Clade: Angiosperms
- Clade: Eudicots
- Clade: Asterids
- Order: Ericales
- Family: Ericaceae
- Genus: Leucopogon
- Species: L. squarrosus

Binomial name
- Leucopogon squarrosus Benth.
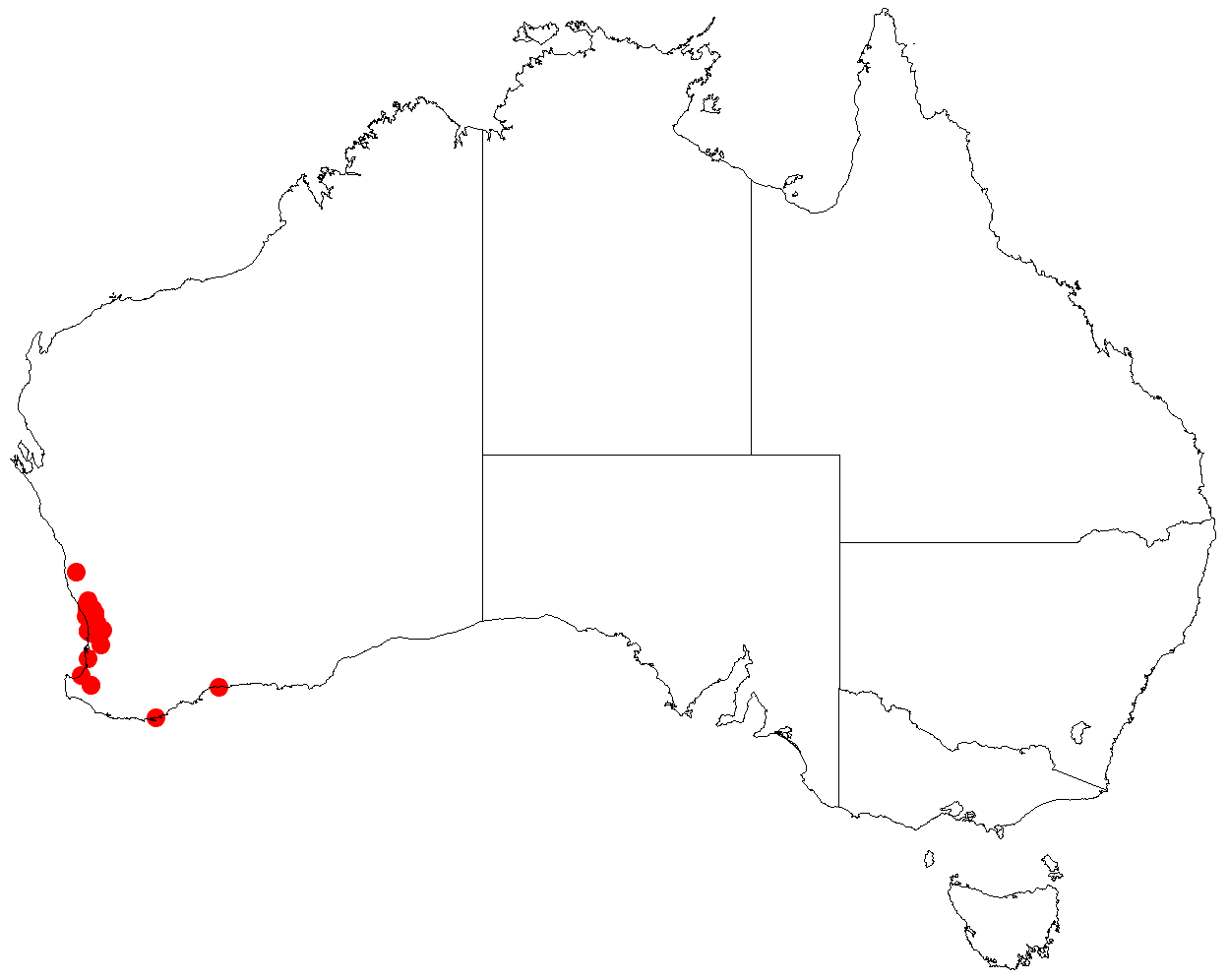
- Occurrence data from AVH

Synonyms
- Leucopogon squarrosus Benth. var. squarrosus; Styphelia squarrosa (Benth.) F.Muell.

= Leucopogon squarrosus =

Species of plant

Leucopogon squarrosus is a species of flowering plant in the heath family Ericaceae and is endemic to the southwest of Western Australia. It is an erect shrub with hairy young branchlets, egg-shaped or elliptic leaves and dense, erect clusters of 5 to 14 white flowers on the ends of branches and in upper leaf axils.

== Description ==
Leucopogon squarrosus is an erect shrub that typically grows up to 1.5 m (4 ft 11 in) high and 1.2 m (3 ft 11 in) wide, its young branchlets usually covered with straight or curved hairs. The leaves are usually spirally arranged, egg-shaped with the narrower end towards the base, or elliptic, 2.2–8.2 mm (0.087–0.323 in) long, 0.9–4.4 mm (0.035–0.173 in) wide and sessile or on a petiole up to 0.3 mm (0.012 in) long. Both surfaces of the leaves are more or less glabrous, the lower surface a slightly paler shade of green. The flowers are arranged in groups of 5 to 14 on the ends of branchlets and in upper leaf axils, with narrowly egg-shaped bracts 1.7–2.4 mm (0.067–0.094 in) long, and egg-shaped bracteoles 1.5–2.6 mm (0.059–0.102 in) long. The sepals are narrowly egg-shaped, 2.5–3.6 mm (0.098–0.142 in) long, and the petals white and joined at the base to form a bell-shaped tube 1.0–1.8 mm (0.039–0.071 in) long, the lobes 2.1–3.0 mm (0.083–0.118 in) long widely spreading, curved backwards and densely bearded inside. Flowering occurs from February to October and the fruit is an elliptic or oval drupe 1.3–1.9 mm (0.051–0.075 in) long.

== Taxonomy and naming ==
Leucopogon squarrosus was first formally described in 1837 by George Bentham in Endlicher's Enumeratio plantarum quas in Novae Hollandiae ora austro-occidentali ad fluvium Cygnorum et in sinu Regis Georgii collegit Carolus Liber Baro de Hügel from specimens collected by Charles von Hügel in the Swan River Colony. The specific epithet (squarrosus) means "squarrose" or "rough with scales", referring to the leaves.

In 2012, Michael Hislop described two subspecies of L. squarrosus in the journal Nuytsia and the names are accepted by the Australian Plant Census:

- Leucopogon squarrosus Benth. subsp. squarrosus is a shrub up to 70 cm (28 in) high and wide with leaves 2.2–5.0 mm (0.087–0.197 in) long and 0.9–3.1 mm (0.035–0.122 in) wide.
- Leucopogon squarrosus subsp. trigynusHislop is a shrub up to 150 cm (59 in) high and 120 cm (47 in) wide with leaves 2.8–8.2 mm (0.11–0.32 in) long and 1.7–4.4 mm (0.067–0.173 in) wide.

== Distribution and habitat ==
Subspecies squarrosus grows in heathland in the understorey of Banksia woodland or in winter-wet heath between the southern suburbs of Perth to near Gingin in the Jarrah Forest and Swan Coastal Plain bioregions of south-western Western Australia. Subspecies trigynus is apparently restricted to an area to the west and south-west of Gingin.

== Conservation status ==
Leucopogon squarrosus is listed as "not threatened" by the Western Australian Government Department of Biodiversity, Conservation and Attractions, but subsp. trigynus is listed as "Priority Two", meaning that it is poorly known and from only one or a few locations.
