= Fenzlia =

Fenzlia may refer to three genera of plants, generally treated as synonyms of other genera:

- Fenzlia, Benth. 1833 = Linanthus Benth. (family Polemoniaceae)
- Fenzlia, Endl. 1834 = Myrtella F.Muell. (family Myrtaceae)
  - Fenzlia obtusa, formerly classified in Myrtella, has been reclassified as Lithomyrtus obtusa (family Myrtaceae)
