= U. australis =

U. australis may refer to:

- Uromyrtus australis, a small tree species found in Australia
- Utricularia australis, a medium-sized, perennial aquatic bladderwort species with a vast geographic range

== See also ==
- Australis (disambiguation)
