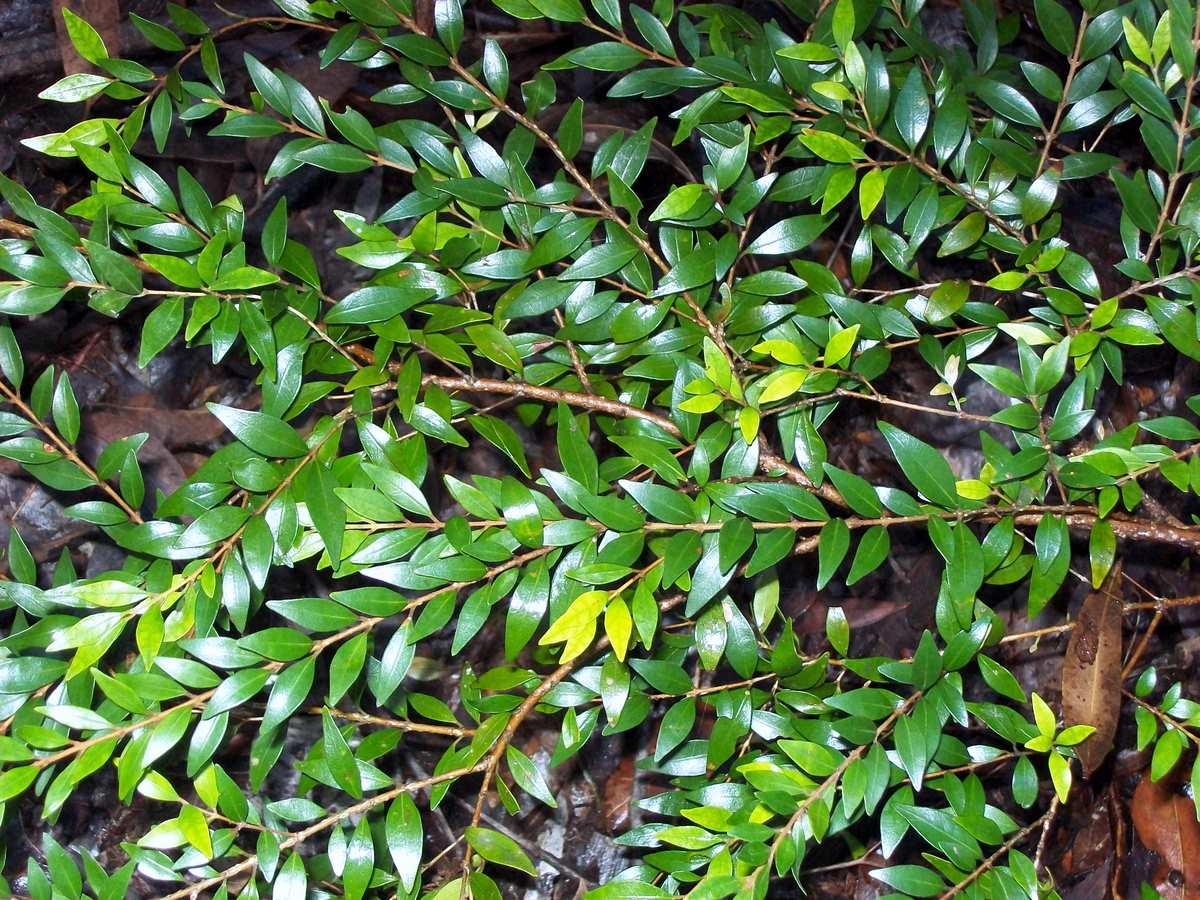

Scientific classification
- Kingdom: Plantae
- Clade: Tracheophytes
- Clade: Angiosperms
- Clade: Eudicots
- Clade: Rosids
- Order: Myrtales
- Family: Myrtaceae
- Genus: Uromyrtus
- Species: U. lamingtonensis

Binomial name
- Uromyrtus lamingtonensis N.Snow & Guymer

= Uromyrtus lamingtonensis =

Species of tree

Uromyrtus lamingtonensis is a rare Australian shrub growing around the state border of New South Wales and Queensland. Like the Peach Myrtle, it has attractive pink flowers.

It differs from other Australian members of the genus by the somewhat rounded leaf base. Also the leaf tip has either a sharp firm point, or a sharp flexible tip. The petals are relatively long.

== Taxonomy ==
This species was first described in 2001 by Neil Snow and Gordon Guymer.

== Habitat ==
A restricted range in high rainfall areas around Lamington National Park and Limpinwood Nature Reserve. Occurring on dry rainforest or on steep rocky slopes, with soils derived from basalt. At altitudes ranging from 720 to 940 metres above sea level.

== Description ==
A shrub or small tree up to 5 metres in height and 12 cm in stem diameter. The stem is irregular in shape. It is often multi-stemmed, low-branched, leaning downhill and crooked. Like many New South Wales rainforest myrtles, the bark is greyish brown, flaky and scaly.

Small branches are a slender pale green or fawn. The new shoots have fawn hairs, unlike the silver new shoots in the Peach Myrtle.

Leaves are opposite on the stem, narrow-elliptic with a prominent tip. 1.5 to 2.5 cm long, 0.3 to 0.7 cm wide. Oil dots are small though easily seen under a lens. They are translucent and two to three diameters apart. The leaf stems are red and about 3 mm long. Leaf venation is obscure, with the mid rib only being easily seen.

=== Flowers & fruit ===
Single flowers form from October to December, appearing from the leaf axils. Petals are rounded, at first a pale pink, then becoming somewhat darker at maturity. The fruit is a round black berry, 4 to 5 mm in diameter. Inside are two to eight seeds. The berry has calyx lobes attached.
