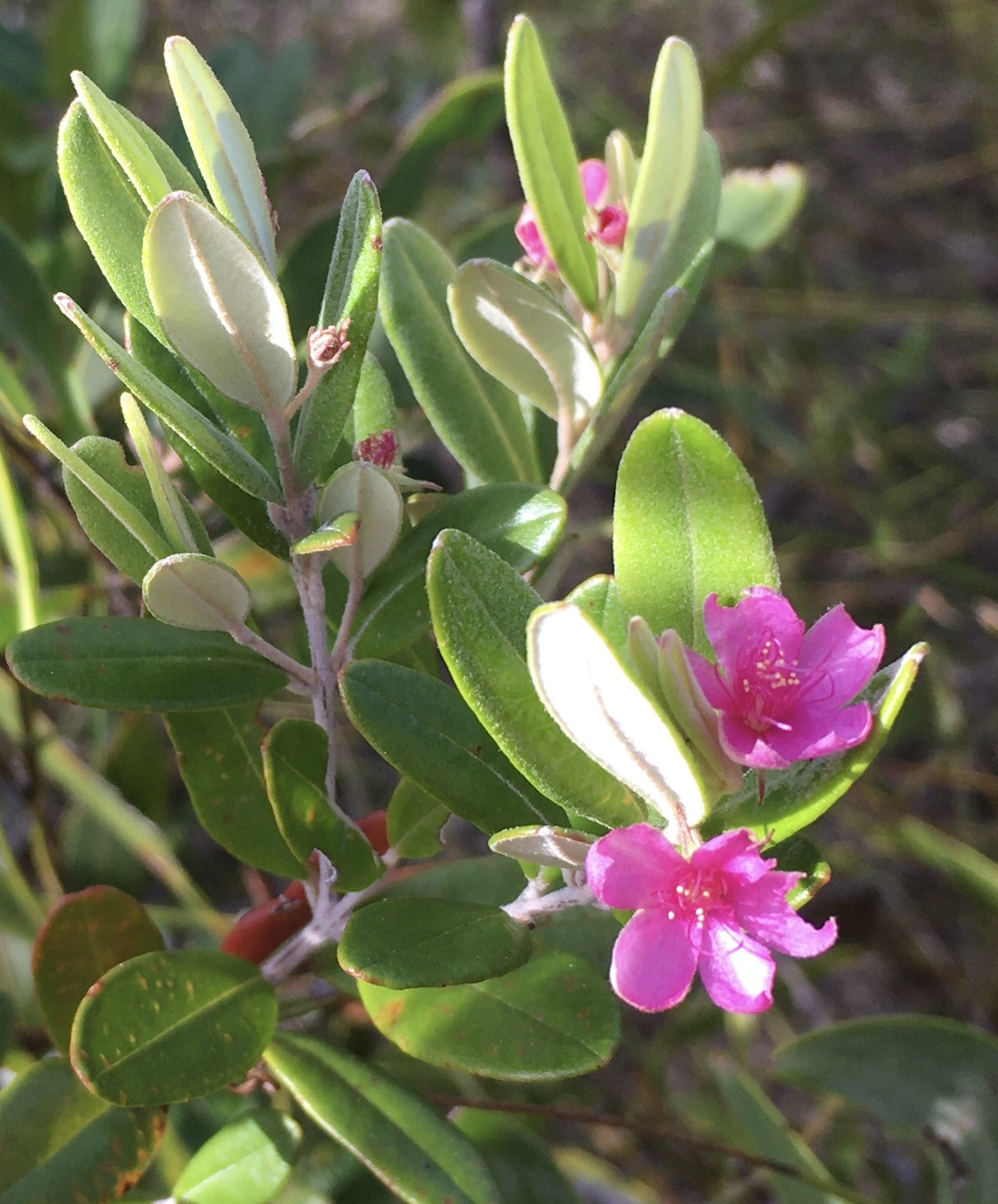
- Flowers
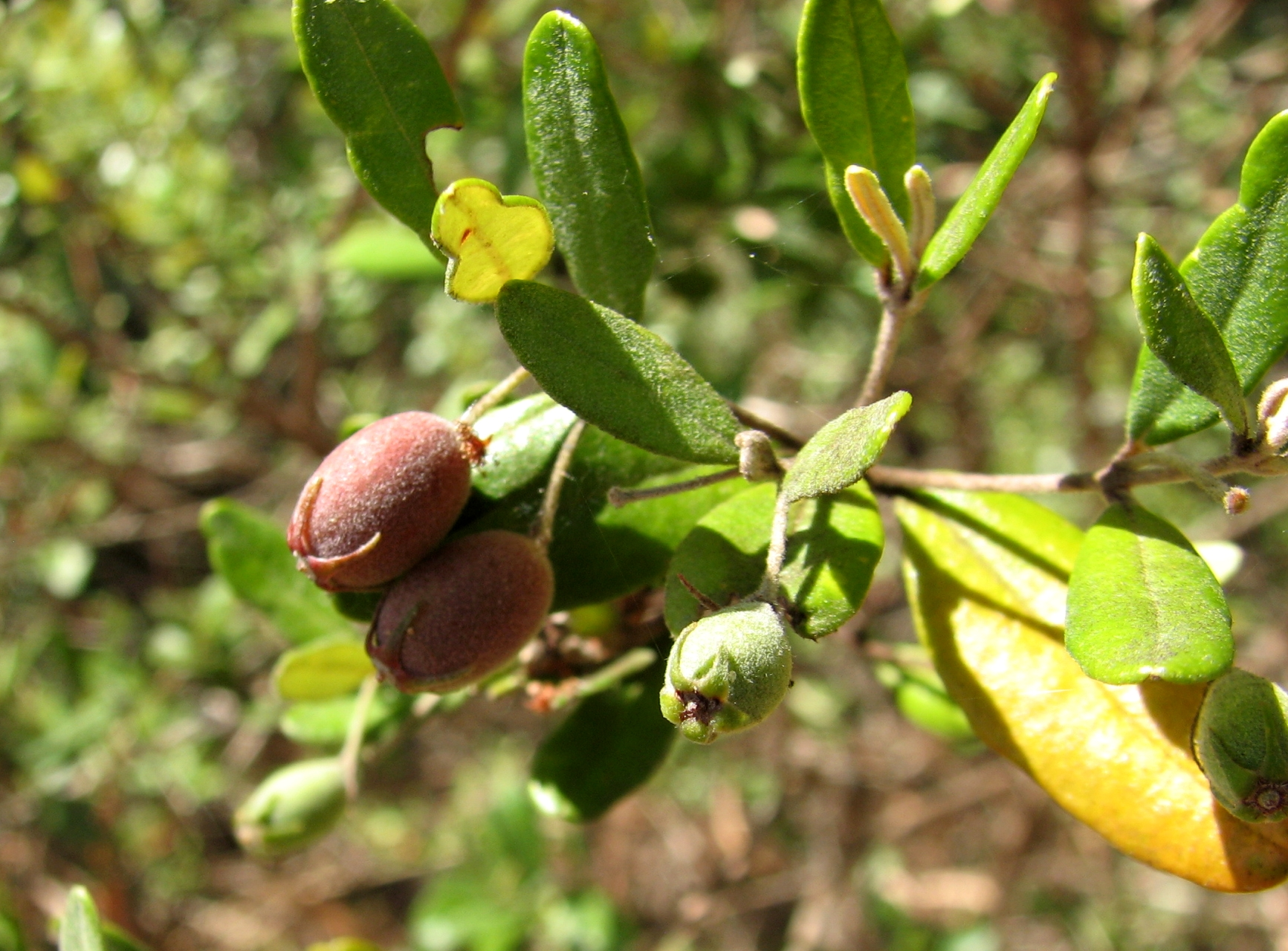
- Fruit

Scientific classification
- Kingdom: Plantae
- Clade: Tracheophytes
- Clade: Angiosperms
- Clade: Eudicots
- Clade: Rosids
- Order: Myrtales
- Family: Myrtaceae
- Genus: Lithomyrtus
- Species: L. obtusa

Binomial name
- Lithomyrtus obtusa (Endl.) N.Snow & Guymer

= Lithomyrtus obtusa =

Species of flowering plant

Lithomyrtus obtusa, commonly known as beach myrtella, is a flowering plant species in the myrtle family, Myrtaceae. It occurs in coastal areas in New Guinea and Queensland, Australia.

It is a shrub that grows to between 1 and 2 metres high. Leaves have recurved edges and are hairy on the underside. Pink flowers appear between January and September in the species' native range. These are followed by globose to cylindrical fruit with a persistent calyx.

In 1770, plant material was collected at Cape Grafton, Endeavour River and Point Lookout (14°49′S 145°13′E) (not to be confused with Point Lookout, also named by Cook), by botanists Joseph Banks and Daniel Solander during Lieutenant James Cook's first voyage of discovery. However, the species was not formally described until 1834 by Austrian botanist Stephan Endlicher who gave it the name Fenzlia obtusa. The species was transferred to the genus Myrtella in 1978 and subsequently to the genus Lithomyrtus in 1999.
