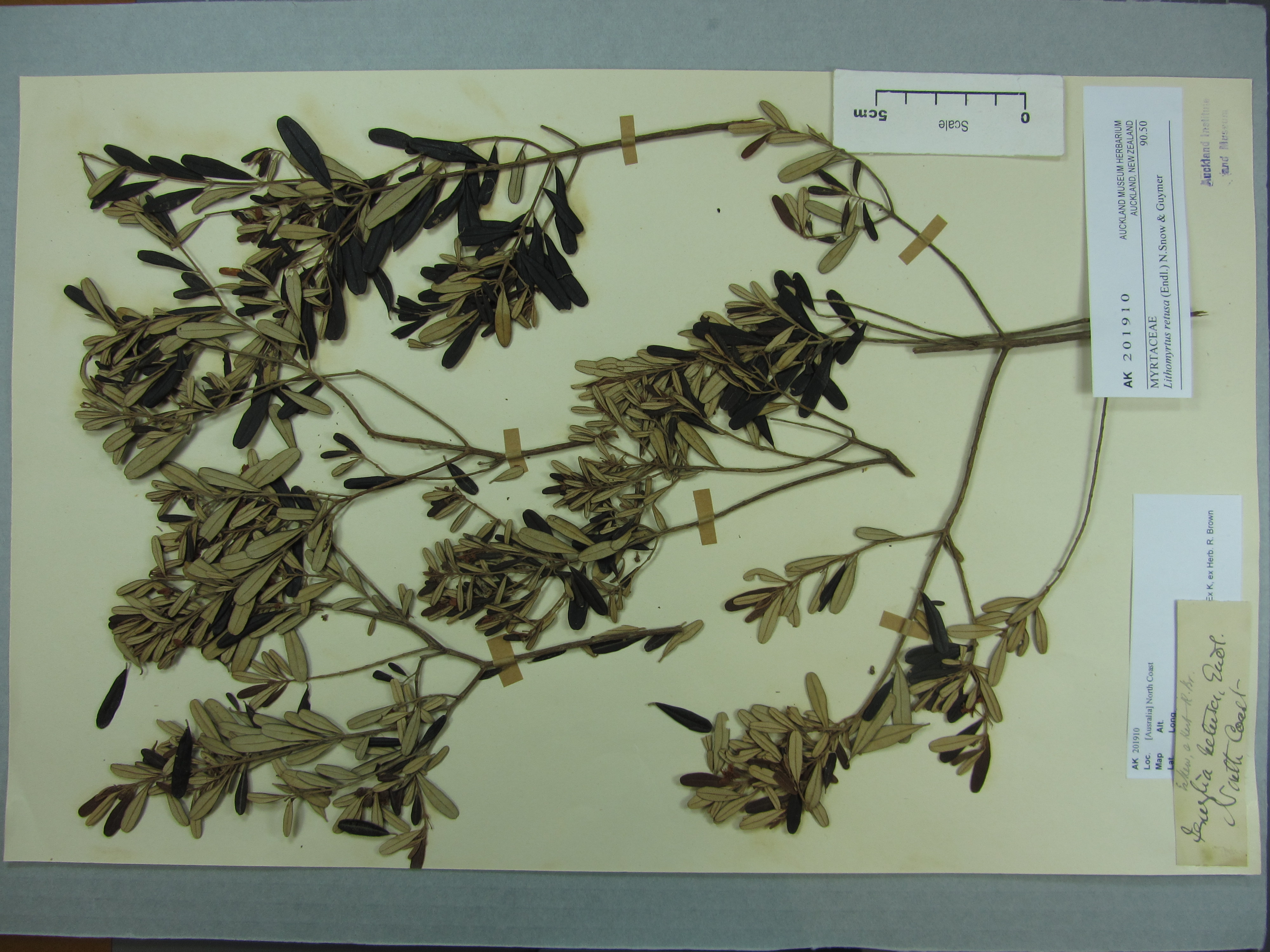

Conservation status
- Data Deficient (IUCN 3.1)

Scientific classification
- Kingdom: Plantae
- Clade: Tracheophytes
- Clade: Angiosperms
- Clade: Eudicots
- Clade: Rosids
- Order: Myrtales
- Family: Myrtaceae
- Genus: Lithomyrtus
- Species: L. retusa

Binomial name
- Lithomyrtus retusa (Endl.) N.Snow & Guymer

Synonyms
- Fenzlia retusa Endl. Myrtella retusa (Endl.) A.J.Scott; Fenzlia phebalioides W.Fitzg. Myrtella phebalioides (W.Fitzg.) A.J.Scott

= Lithomyrtus retusa =

Species of shrub

Lithomyrtus retusa is a member of the family Myrtaceae native to Western Australia, the Northern Territory, and Queensland. It was first described in 1834 by Stephan Endlicher as Fenzlia retusa, but in 1999 it was assigned to the genus, Lithomyrtus, to give its currently accepted name, by Neil Snow and Gordon Guymer.

The small tree or shrub typically grows to a height of 1 to 5 metres (3 to 16 ft). It blooms between January and December producing white-pink flowers.

It is found in gullies, escarpments and streambanks in the Kimberley region of Western Australia where it grows in skeletal soils over sandstone.
