= Eduard Fenzl =

Austrian botanist

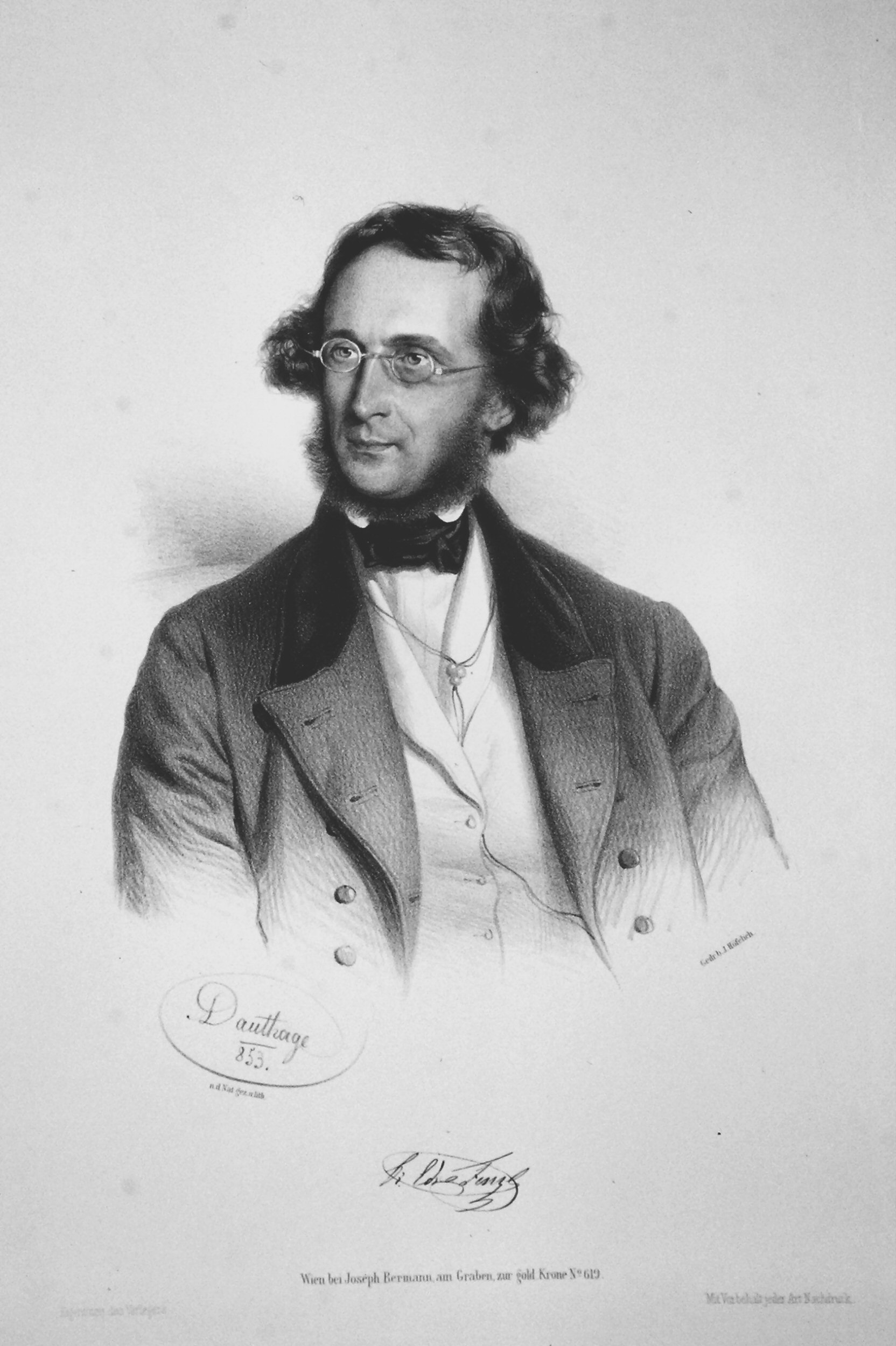
- Eduard Fenzl (1808-1879), lithograph by Adolf Dauthage
- Born: November 14, 1808; Krummnußbaum
- Died: September 29, 1879 (aged 70); Vienna
- Scientific career
- Fields: Botany
- Workplaces: University of Vienna; Imperial Botanical Cabinet
- Author abbrev. (botany): Fenzl

Eduard Fenzl (1808, in Krummnußbaum – 1879, in Vienna) was an Austrian botanist.

== Life and contributions ==
An obituary notes "[he] was Professor of Botany and Director of the Imperial Botanical Cabinet, a member of the Vienna Academy of Sciences, and Vice-President of the Vienna Horticultural Society."

Fenzl made contributions towards Karl Friedrich Philipp von Martius's Flora Brasiliensis and to Stephan Endlicher's Enumeratio plantarum quas in Novae Hollandiae, etc. He was the author of Pugillus plantarum novarum Syriæ et Tauri occidentalis primus (1842).

The plant genus Fenzlia is named in his honor.

== Works ==
=== As author ===
- Dissertatio inauguralis medico-botanica sistens extensionem et distributionem geographicam Alsinearum familiae naturalis per terras arcticas partemque zonae temperatae orbis antiqui (1833)
- Sertum Cabulicum. Enumeratio Plantarum Quas in Itinere Inter Dera-Ghazee-Khan Et Cabul, Mensibus Majo Et Junio 1833 Collegit Dr Martin Honigberger. Accedunt Novarum Vel Minus Cognitarum Stirpium Icones Et Descriptiones Part 1 (1836)
- Novarum stirpium decas I-X (1839)
- Pugillus Plantarum novarum Syriae et Tauri occidentalis primus (1842)
- Illustrationes et descriptiones plantarum novarum Syriae et Tauri occidentalis (1843)
- Über die Stellung der Gattung Oxera im natürlichen Systeme (1843)
- Über die Blütezeit der Paulownia imperialis (1851)
- … Differential-Charaktere der Arten der Gattung Cyperus (1855)
- Bildliche Naturgeschichte des Pflanzenreiches in Umrissen nach seinen wichtigsten Ordnungen (1855)

=== As editor ===
- Theodor Kotschy. Abbildungen und Beschreibungen neuer und seltener Thiere (1843)
- Franz Xaver Freiherr von Wulfen. Flora Norica Phanerogama (1858)
