= Krummnußbaum =

- Municipality
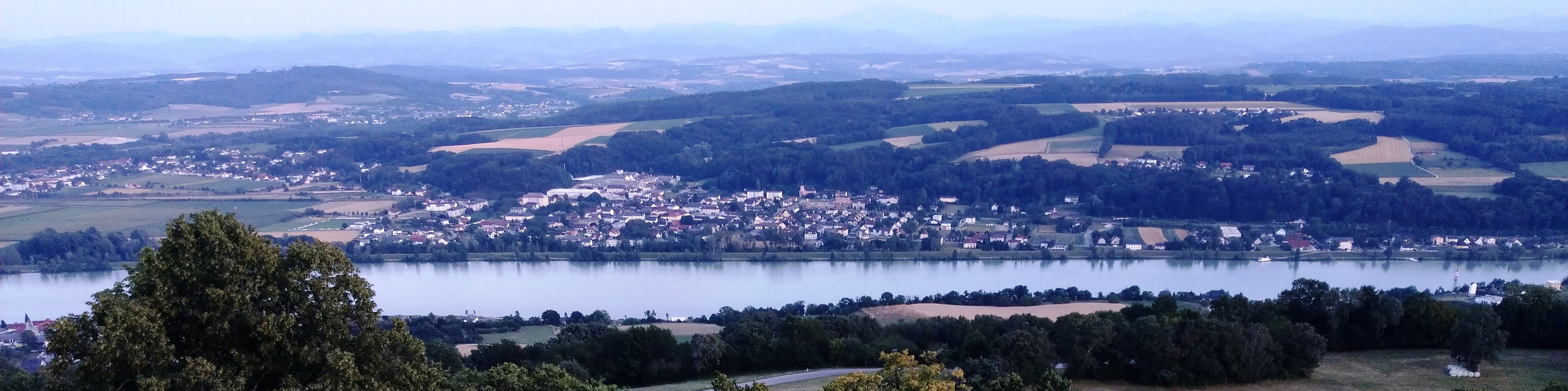

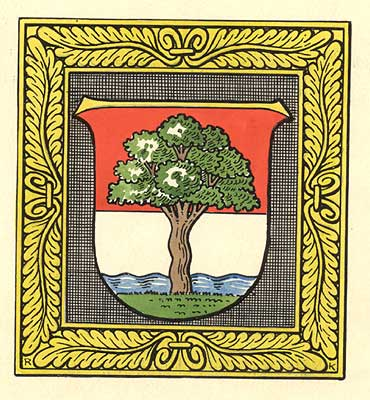
- Coat of arms

- Location within Austria
- Coordinates: 48°12′N 15°10′E
- Country: Austria
- State: Lower Austria
- District: Melk

Government
  - Mayor: Bernhard Kerndler (ÖVP)

Area
  - Total: 10.07 km^{2} (3.89 sq mi)
- Elevation: 219 m (719 ft)

Population (2018-01-01)
  - Total: 1,500
  - Density: 150/km^{2} (390/sq mi)
- Time zone: UTC+1 (CET)
  - Summer (DST): UTC+2 (CEST)
- Postal code: 3375
- Area code: 02757
- Website: www.krummnussbaum.at

Krummnußbaum is a town in the district of Melk in the Austrian state of Lower Austria.

== Population ==
Historical population
Year	Pop.	±%
1971	1,204	—
1981	1,234	+2.5%
1991	1,293	+4.8%
2001	1,347	+4.2%
