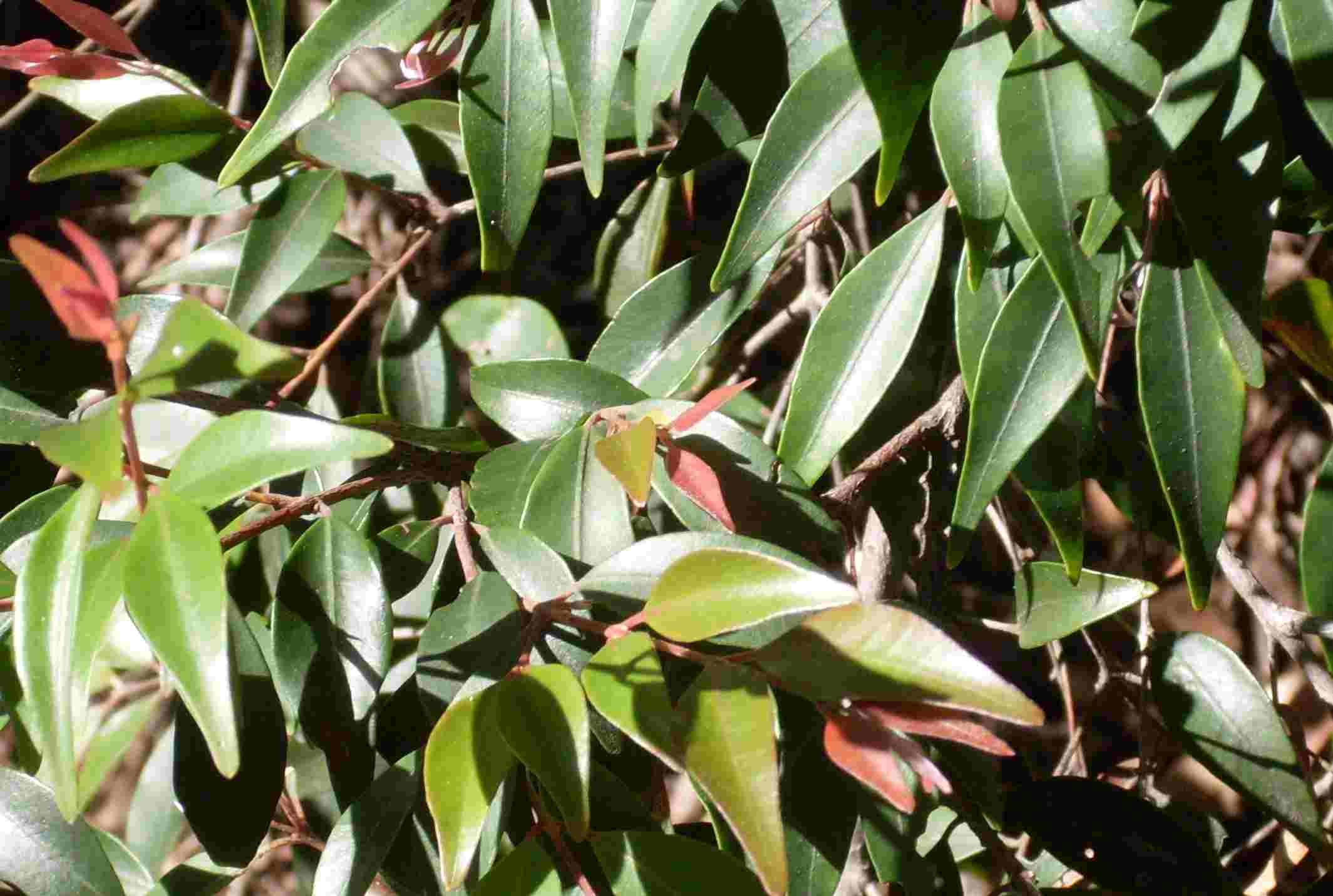
- Uromyrtus australis

Scientific classification
- Kingdom: Plantae
- Clade: Tracheophytes
- Clade: Angiosperms
- Clade: Eudicots
- Clade: Rosids
- Order: Myrtales
- Family: Myrtaceae
- Subfamily: Myrtoideae
- Tribe: Myrteae
- Genus: Uromyrtus; Burret

= Uromyrtus =

Genus of flowering plants in the myrtle family

Uromyrtus is a genus of plants in the myrtle family Myrtaceae described as a genus in 1941. The greatest diversity of species are found in New Caledonia and the remainder are found in Australia, New Guinea and Borneo.

The flowers occur singly in the axils of the leaves and typically point downwards. In this respect the genus superficially resembles the neotropical genus Ugni, but evidence from DNA sequencing studies suggests the genera are not closely related.

Uromyrtus australis A.J.Scott – an Australian species that is endangered and restricted to a small location in northern New South Wales. This plant is known as the peach myrtle due to the colour and shape of its fruit.

Species

1. Uromyrtus allisoniana – Papua New Guinea
2. Uromyrtus archboldiana – New Guinea
3. Uromyrtus artensis – New Caledonia
4. Uromyrtus australis – New South Wales
5. Uromyrtus baumanii – New Caledonia
6. Uromyrtus billardierei – New Caledonia
7. Uromyrtus brassii – New Guinea
8. Uromyrtus curvipes – New Caledonia
9. Uromyrtus emarginata – New Caledonia
10. Uromyrtus gomonenensis – New Caledonia
11. Uromyrtus lamingtonensis – New South Wales, Queensland
12. Uromyrtus metrosideros – Queensland
13. Uromyrtus nekouana – New Caledonia
14. Uromyrtus neomyrtoides – New Caledonia
15. Uromyrtus ngoyensis – New Caledonia
16. Uromyrtus novoguineensis – Papua New Guinea
17. Uromyrtus paulotchensis – New Caledonia
18. Uromyrtus rostrata – New Guinea
19. Uromyrtus sarawakensis – Sarawak
20. Uromyrtus sunshinensis – New Caledonia
21. Uromyrtus supraaxillaris – New Caledonia
22. Uromyrtus tenella – Queensland
23. Uromyrtus thymifolia – New Caledonia
