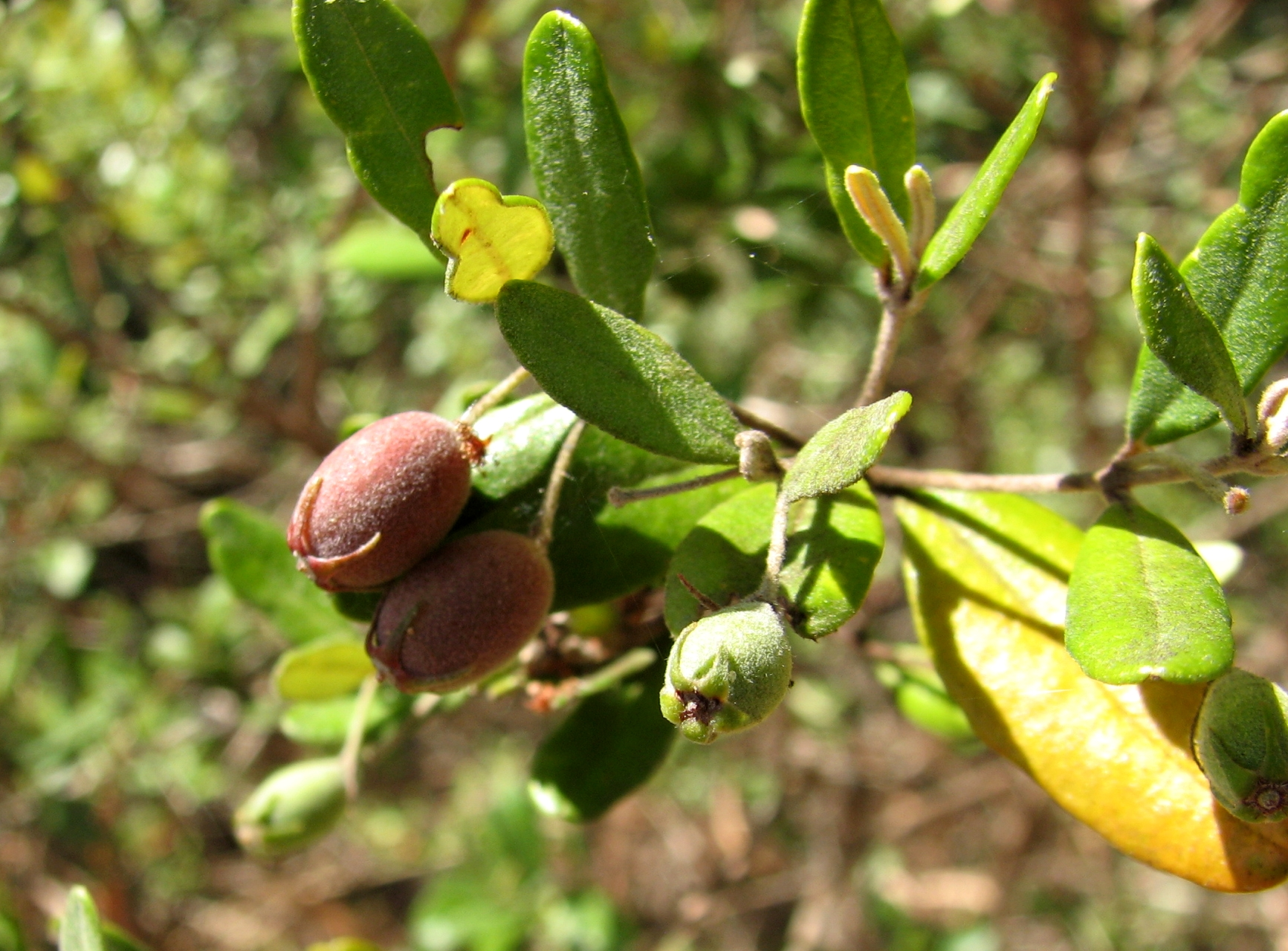
- Fruit of Lithomyrtus obtusa

Scientific classification
- Kingdom: Plantae
- Clade: Tracheophytes
- Clade: Angiosperms
- Clade: Eudicots
- Clade: Rosids
- Order: Myrtales
- Family: Myrtaceae
- Subfamily: Myrtoideae
- Tribe: Myrteae
- Genus: Lithomyrtus; F.Muell.

= Lithomyrtus =

Genus of flowering plants in the myrtle family

Lithomyrtus is a genus of small trees and shrubs in the myrtle family, Myrtaceae. There are 11 species, native to the tropics of northern Australia and New Guinea:

- Lithomyrtus cordata (A.J.Scott) N.Snow & Guymer - (Northern Territory)
- Lithomyrtus densifolia N.Snow & Guymer - (Northern Territory)
- Lithomyrtus dunlopii N.Snow & Guymer - (Northern Territory)
- Lithomyrtus grandifolia N.Snow & Guymer - (Northern Territory)
- Lithomyrtus hypoleuca F.Muell. ex N.Snow & Guymer - (Northern Territory, Queensland)
- Lithomyrtus kakaduensis N.Snow & Guymer - (Northern Territory)
- Lithomyrtus linariifolia N.Snow & Guymer - (Northern Territory)
- Lithomyrtus microphylla (Benth.) N.Snow & Guymer (Queensland)
- Lithomyrtus obtusa (Endl.) N.Snow & Guymer - beach myrtella (New Guinea, Queensland)
- Lithomyrtus repens N.Snow & Guymer - (Northern Territory)
- Lithomyrtus retusa (Endl.) N.Snow & Guymer - (Western Australia, Northern Territory, Queensland)

The genus was formally described in 1857 by Victorian Government Botanist Ferdinand von Mueller.
