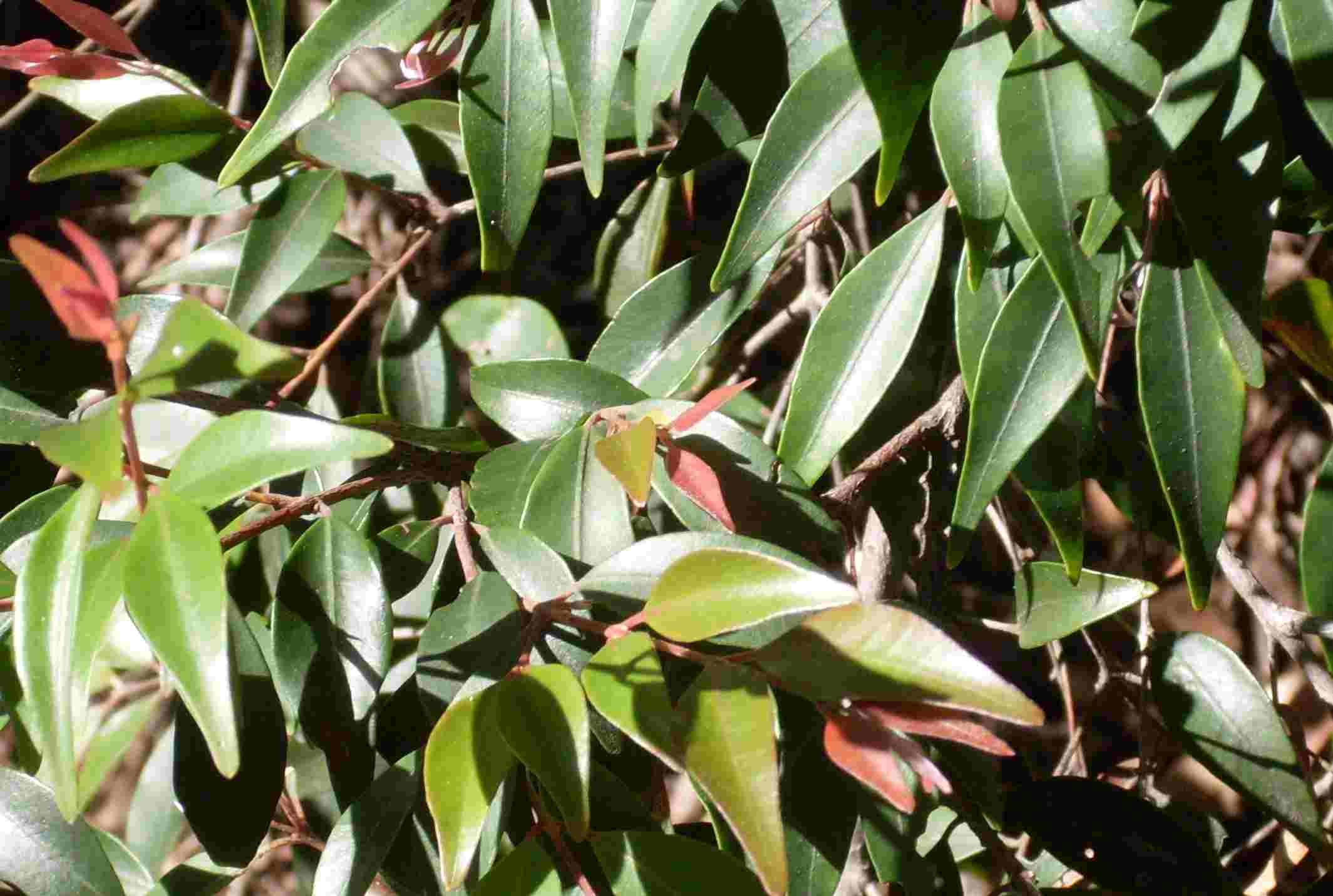

Conservation status
- Critically endangered (EPBC Act)

Scientific classification
- Kingdom: Plantae
- Clade: Tracheophytes
- Clade: Angiosperms
- Clade: Eudicots
- Clade: Rosids
- Order: Myrtales
- Family: Myrtaceae
- Genus: Uromyrtus
- Species: U. australis

Binomial name
- Uromyrtus australis A.J.Scott

= Uromyrtus australis =

Species of tree

Uromyrtus australis, commonly known as the peach myrtle, is a small tree growing around Nightcap National Park, New South Wales, Australia. Its conservation status is critically endangered. The delicate foliage, pink flowers and appealing fruit makes this a particularly beautiful tree.

== Distribution and habitat ==
Restricted range associated with a very high rainfall and coachwood on warm temperate rainforest at an altitude of 400 to 770 metres above sea level. There are around 800 plants in the wild.

== Description ==
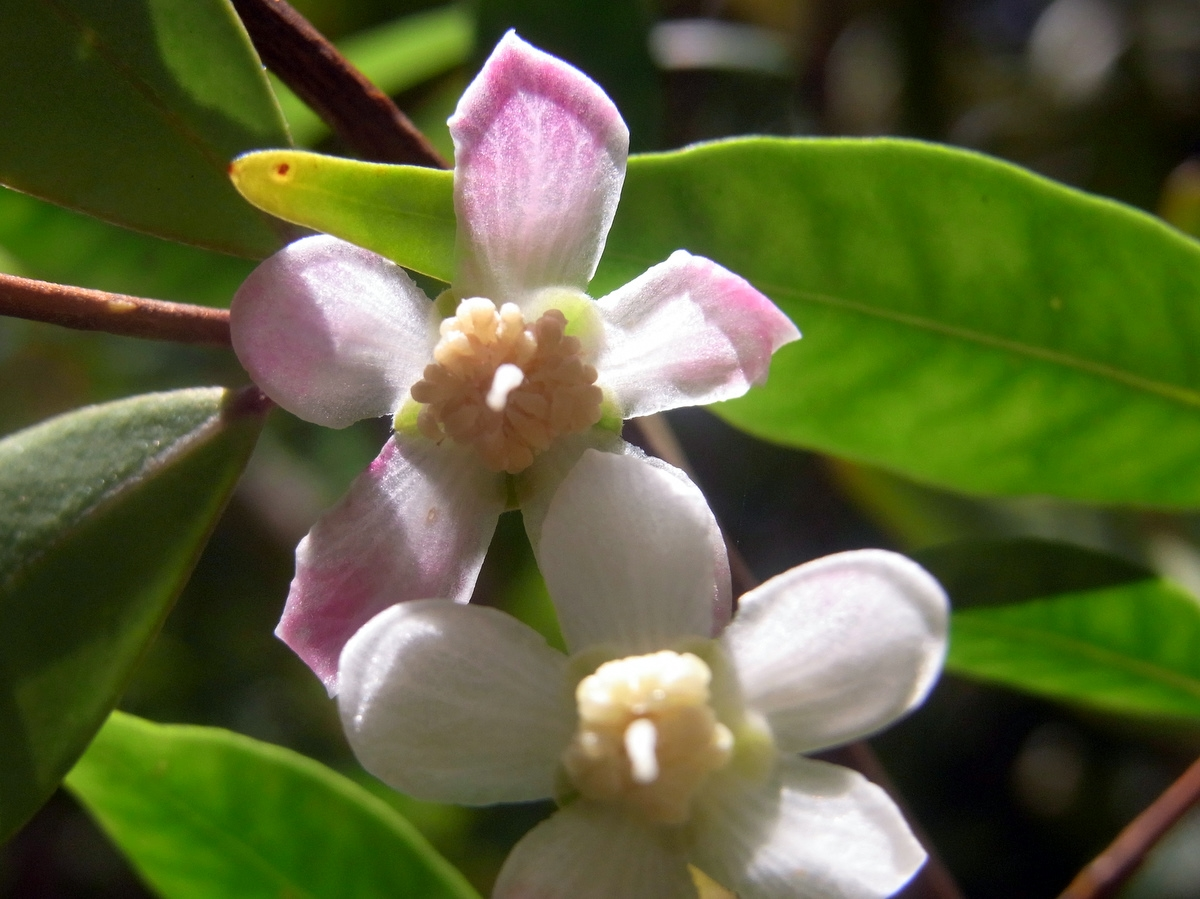
flowers

Uromyrtus australis reaches a height of 12 metres (39 feet) and a stem diameter of 15 cm (5.9 in). The bark is flaky or scaly, brown. Dead bark is thin. The trunk is cylindrical but often crooked. The leaves are opposite and entire, and measure 2.5 to 4.5 cm (0.98 to 1.77 in) long, tapering to a tip. Shiny above but dull beneath. Young leaf growth with white hairs, new leaves bright red. Oil dots obscure. Branchlets with white hairs, becoming smooth with age. The leaf stalks 2 to 3 mm long, silky hairs only on young leaves. Only the midrib is prominent on both surfaces, lateral veins obscure, raised above but sunken below. There is no intramarginal vein.

In November and December white flowers appear, turning deep pink. The fruit is black berry, globular in shape, 5 to 8 mm in diameter with one or two cells, with two seeds in each. Fruit is ripe from April to July. After removing the aril, germination begins after two months without much difficulty.
