= Frank Udovicic =

Australian botanist

- Born: 1966 (age 59–60)
- Education: The University of Melbourne
- Known for: Phylogenetic Systematics of Australian plants, in particular those in the Myrtaceae
- Scientific career
- Fields: Botany, Molecular Systematics, Myrtaceae
- Workplaces: Royal Botanic Gardens Victoria
- Thesis: DNA phylogeny of eucalypts (1995)
- Doctoral advisor: Pauline Y. Ladiges
- Author abbrev. (botany): Udovicic

Frank Udovicic is an Australian botanist who specialises in molecular systematics and phytogeography.

== Career ==
Udovicic completed his Bachelor of Science (Honours) at The University of Melbourne in 1990. In 1995 he completed his PhD at The University of Melbourne. Both his Honours and PhD focused on the molecular phylogeny of the Eucalypts under the supervision of Prof. Pauline Ladiges. Udovicic held a Postdoctoral Fellow position at the CSIRO Plant Industry, Canberra from 1995 to 1997, working on Rhamnaceae. At the conclusion of this post he moved back to Melbourne and took up a Postdoctoral Fellow position at The University of Melbourne until 1999. Udovicic was appointed as the first Molecular Systematist at the Royal Botanic Gardens Victoria in 1999 to set up and manage the Maud Gibson Trust Molecular Laboratory, which enables Herbarium staff and postgraduate students to undertake DNA sequencing and other molecular marker work. Udovicic completed a Diploma of Business (Frontline Management) in 2003 at Box Hill Institute. Udovicic was successful in gaining the position of Manager in the Research Branch in 2003, a position he still holds today. Some of Udovicic's recent work has been focused on improving the Flora of Victoria website by adding high quality characteristic images eg. flower buds, of common and rare and threatened species. This has been achieved in conjunction with Val Stajsic and Angharad Johnson.

During Udovicic's career he has collected over 480 specimens, mainly from the Australian Capital Territory, South Australia and Victoria (Australia), which are lodged at CANB, MEL, MELU, PERTH, NSW and HO.

== Standard author abbreviation ==
The standard author abbreviation Udovicic is used to indicate this person as the author when citing a botanical name.

== Selected published names ==
- Cryptandra propinqua subsp. maranoa Kellermann & Udovicic
- Cryptandra speciosa subsp. strigosa Kellermann & Udovicic

See also:

- Australian Plant Name Index
- International Plant Names Index

== Selected publications ==
=== Journal articles ===
- Ladiges, Pauline Yvonne; Frank Udovicic; Nelson, Gareth (2003). "Australian biogeographical connections and the phylogeny of large genera in the plant family Myrtaceae". Journal of Biogeography. 30 (7): 989–998. doi:10.1046/j.1365-2699.2003.00881.x. Wikidata Q55967702.
- Carlos Parra-O.; Bayly, Michael James; Drinnan, Andrew; Frank Udovicic; Ladiges, Pauline Yvonne (2009). "Phylogeny, major clades and infrageneric classification ofCorymbia(Myrtaceae), based on nuclear ribosomal DNA and morphology". Australian Systematic Botany. 22 (5): 384. doi:10.1071/sb09028. Wikidata Q54670636.
- Brown, Gillian Kim; Frank Udovicic; Ladiges, Pauline Yvonne (2001). "Molecular phylogeny and biogeography of Melaleuca, Callistemon and related genera (Myrtaceae)". Australian Systematic Botany. 14 (4): 565. doi:10.1071/sb00029. Wikidata Q56483677.
