= Enumeratio plantarum quas in Novae Hollandiae ora austro-occidentali ad fluvium Cygnorum et in sinu Regis Georgii collegit Carolus Liber Baro de Hügel =

Book by Stephan Endlicher

Enumeratio plantarum quas in Novae Hollandiæ ora austro-occidentali ad fluvium Cygnorum et in sinu Regis Georgii collegit Carolus Liber Baro de Hügel is a description of the plants collected at the Swan River colony and King George Sound in Western Australia. The author, Stephan Endlicher, used a collection arranged by Charles von Hügel to compile the first flora for the new settlements. Hugel visited the region during 1833–1834, several years after the founding of the colony. The work provided formal descriptions, in Latin, of new species and genera of plants. The single instalment was produced in Europe by Endlicher in 1837, the work also included contributions by Eduard Fenzl, George Bentham, Heinrich Wilhelm Schott.

The abbreviation Enum. Pl. [Endlicher] is used to refer to this work in botanical literature.
