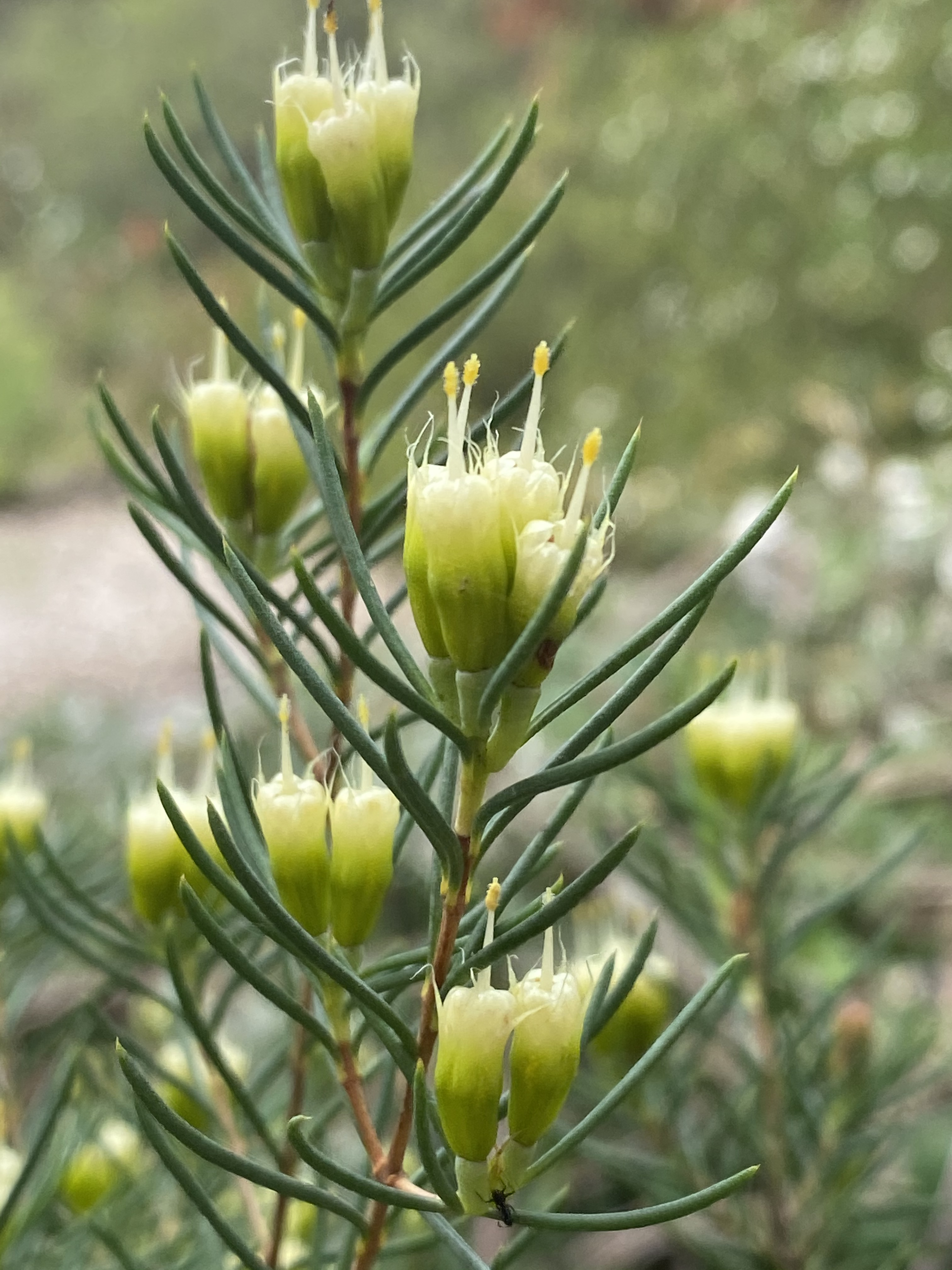
- Homoranthus montanus in the ANBG

Conservation status
- Vulnerable (EPBC Act)

Scientific classification
- Kingdom: Plantae
- Clade: Embryophytes
- Clade: Tracheophytes
- Clade: Spermatophytes
- Clade: Angiosperms
- Clade: Eudicots
- Clade: Rosids
- Order: Myrtales
- Family: Myrtaceae
- Genus: Homoranthus
- Species: H. montanus

Binomial name
- Homoranthus montanus Craven & S.R.Jones
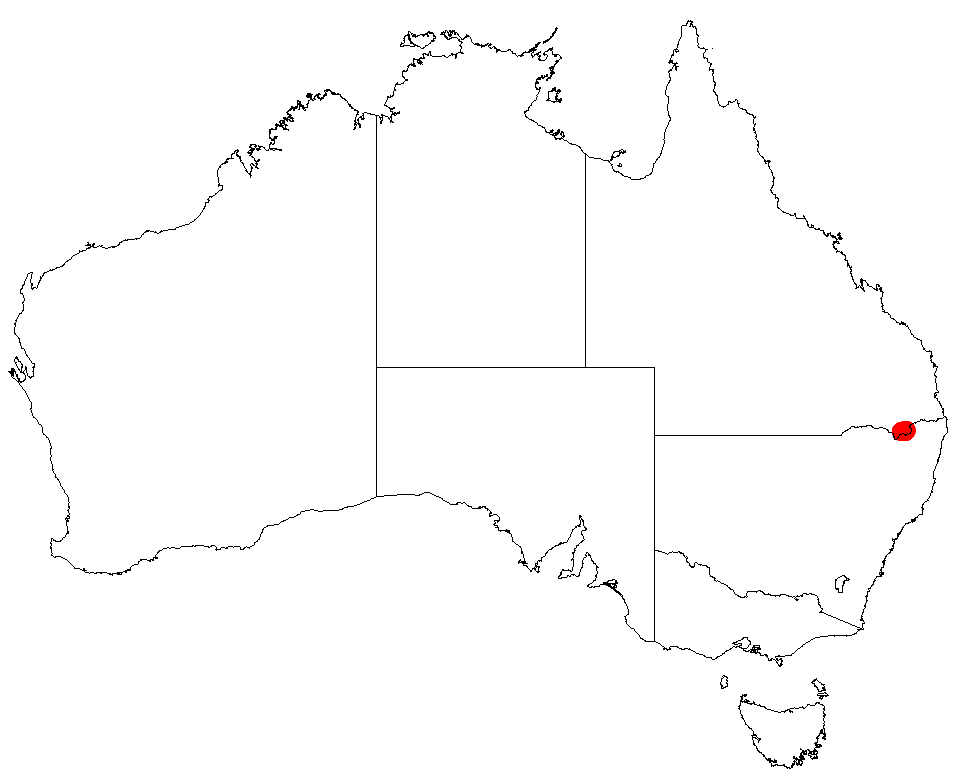
- Occurrence data from AVH

= Homoranthus montanus =

Species of flowering plant

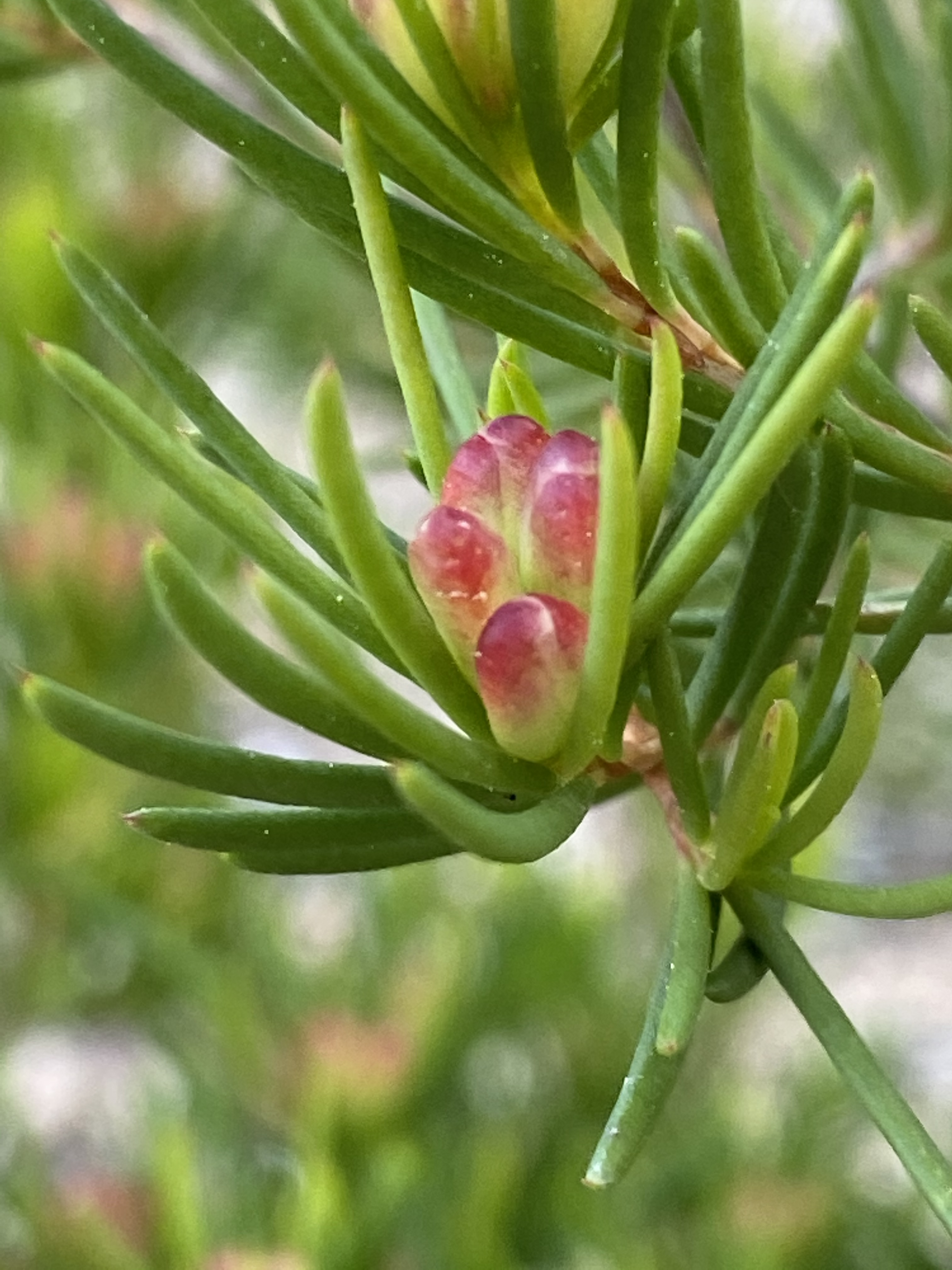
Flower bud

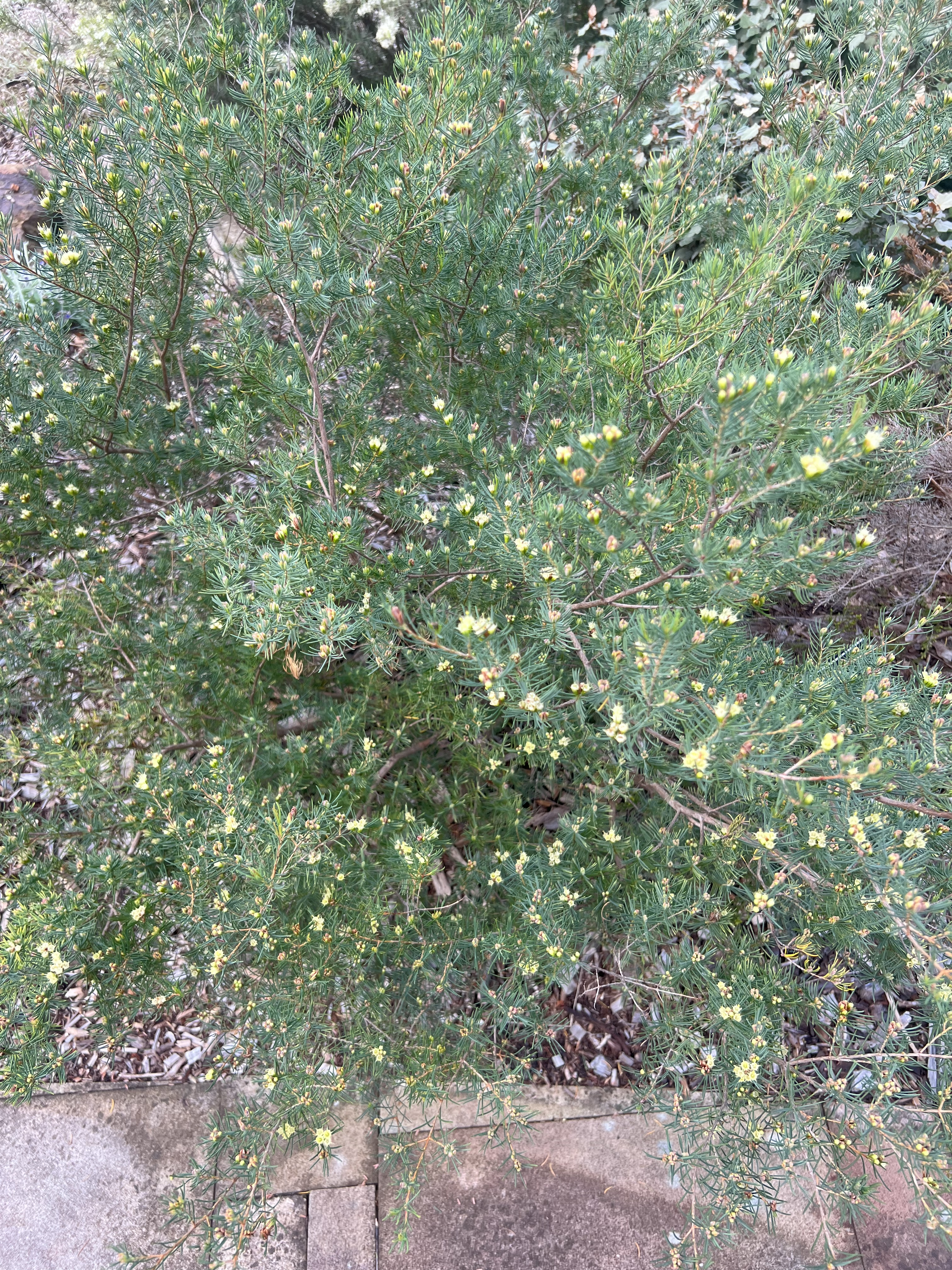
Habit

Homoranthus montanus is a plant in the myrtle family Myrtaceae and is endemic to a small area in southern Queensland. It has narrow leaves and up to one to six small tubular, cream-coloured flowers arranged in leaf axils near the ends of the branchlets. As the flowers age, they turn red.

== Description ==
An erect shrub growing to 1.2 m (4 ft) tall. The leaves are 0.8 mm (0.03 in) thick. Flowers and fruits sporadically throughout the year, mostly October to November.

== Taxonomy and naming ==
Homoranthus montanus was first formally described in 1991 by Lyndley Craven and S.R Jones and the description was published in Australian Systematic Botany. The specific epithet (montanus) is a Latin word meaning "of mountains".

== Distribution and habitat ==
Restricted to Ballandean and Mount Jibbinbar Queensland. Grows on shallow sandy soils in woodland and heath on and around granite outcrops.

== Conservation ==
Homoranthus montanus is listed as "vulnerable" under the Australian Government EPBC Act. A very rare species known from two small populations. IUCN (2010) considered vulnerable.
