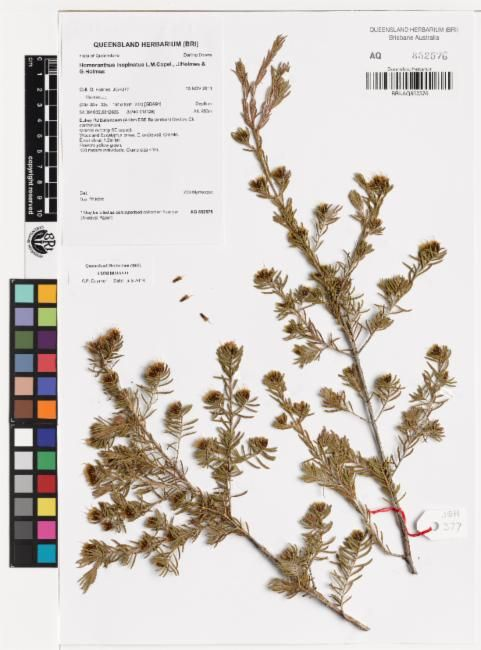
- Holotype in the Queensland Herbarium

Scientific classification
- Kingdom: Plantae
- Clade: Tracheophytes
- Clade: Angiosperms
- Clade: Eudicots
- Clade: Rosids
- Order: Myrtales
- Family: Myrtaceae
- Genus: Homoranthus
- Species: H. inopinatus

Binomial name
- Homoranthus inopinatus L.M.Copel., J.Holmes & G.Holmes

= Homoranthus inopinatus =

Species of flowering plant

Homoranthus inopinatus is a plant in the myrtle family Myrtaceae and is endemic to a small area in southern Queensland. It is an upright shrub with linear leaves and with groups of three to six flowers in leaf axils near the end of branchlets. It is only known from a single small population on private property near Ballandean.

== Description ==
Homoranthus inopinatus is an erect shrub 0.7–1.4 m (2–5 ft) tall, 0.3–1 m (1–3 ft) wide. The leaves are a dull pale green, opposite and aromatic.

== Taxonomy and naming ==
Homoranthus inopinatus was first formally described in 2011 by Lachlan Copeland, Lyndley Craven and Jeremy Bruhl from a specimen collected on private property near Ballendean by Jenny and Glenn Holmes in 2002 and the description was published in Australian Systematic Botany. The specific epithet (inopinatus) is a Latin word meaning "unexpected", referring to the discovery of this species in an otherwise botanically well-known district.

== Conservation status ==
Currently known from a single population, H. inopinatus is threatened by inappropriate fire regimes, grazing and physical disturbance by feral pigs and deer. A ROTAP conservation code of 2E using Briggs and Leigh (1996). IUCN (2010) criteria considered as 'Critically Endangered'.
