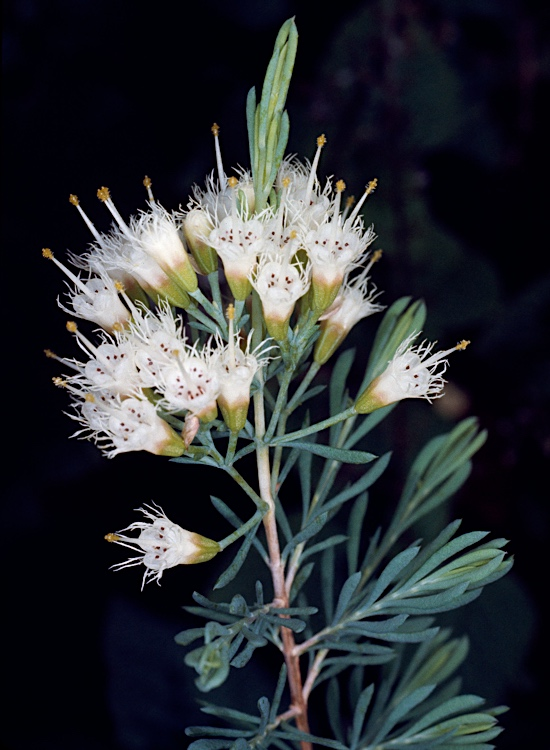
- Homoranthus tropicus in the Australian National Botanic Gardens

Scientific classification
- Kingdom: Plantae
- Clade: Tracheophytes
- Clade: Angiosperms
- Clade: Eudicots
- Clade: Rosids
- Order: Myrtales
- Family: Myrtaceae
- Genus: Homoranthus
- Species: H. tropicus

Binomial name
- Homoranthus tropicus Byrnes
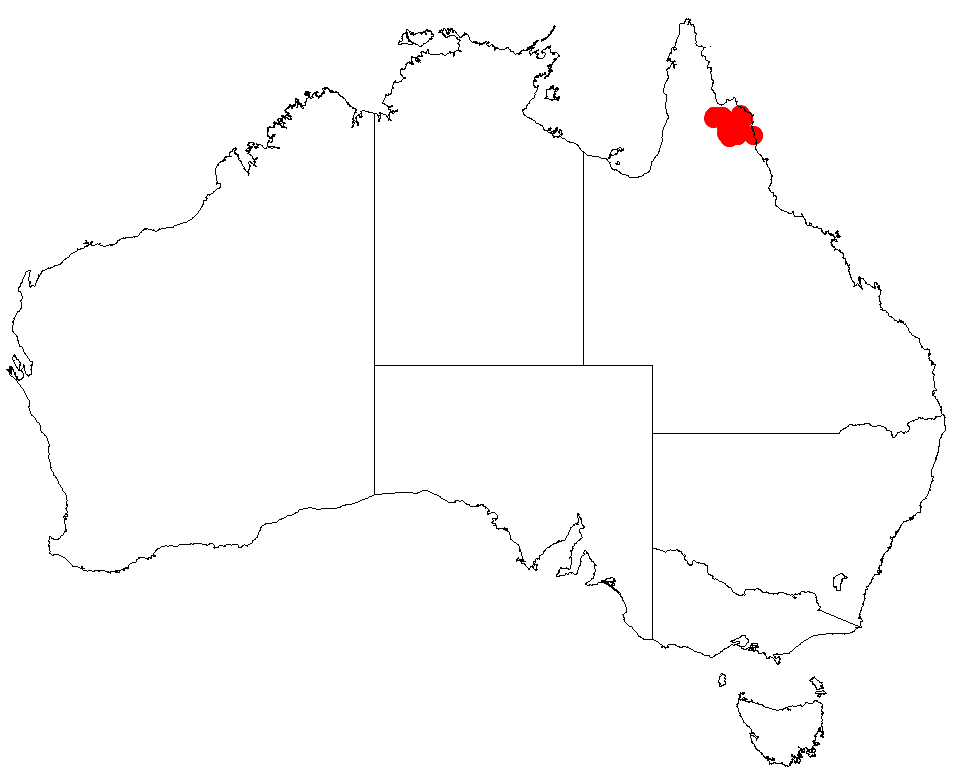
- Occurrence data from AVH

= Homoranthus tropicus =

Species of flowering plant

Homoranthus tropicus is a flowering plant in the family Myrtaceae and is endemic to tropical north Queensland. It is a shrub with curved, club-shaped leaves and white flowers in a corymb-like arrangement on the ends of branchlets.

== Description ==
Homoranthus tropicus is a shrub to 1 m (3 ft 3 in) high. The leaves are arranged opposite, club-shaped, curved, shortly pointed and tapering at the base to a short petiole 4–8 mm (0.16–0.31 in) long, 0.5 mm (0.020 in) wide and marked with tiny dots. The white flowers are on a pedicel 0.5–1.5 mm (0.020–0.059 in) long, the small bracts 1–1.5 mm (0.039–0.059 in) long, keeled and ending in a short point. The calyx tube, distinctly angled and up to 3–4 mm (0.12–0.16 in) long, lobes 3–4 mm (0.12–0.16 in) long. The petals are broadly egg-shaped to almost round, margins smooth, about 2 mm (0.079 in) long and the style up to 7 mm (0.28 in) long. Flowering occurs sporadically throughout the year, primarily February to July and the fruit is a single seed retained in the calyx.

== Taxonomy and naming ==
Homoranthus tropicus was first formally described in 1981 by Norman Byrnes from a specimen he collected north of Laura in 1975 and the description was published in Austrolbaileya. The specific epithet (tropicus) means "tropical".

== Distribution and habitat ==
This species grows in northern Queensland in heath or shrubby woodland on shallow rocky soils over sandstone.

== Conservation status ==
It has a restricted distribution and considered rare by Briggs and Leigh (1996) given a ROTAP conservation code of 2R.
