= Homoranthus tricolor =

Scientific classification
- Kingdom: Plantae
- Clade: Tracheophytes
- Clade: Angiosperms
- Clade: Eudicots
- Clade: Rosids
- Order: Myrtales
- Family: Myrtaceae
- Genus: Homoranthus
- Species: H. tricolor

Binomial name
- Homoranthus tricolor A.R.Bean

Species of flowering plant

Homoranthus tricolor, is a flowering plant in the family Myrtaceae and is endemic to a small area in south-east Queensland. It is an upright shrub with linear to lance-shaped leaves and green, red and black flowers arranged singly or in pairs in upper leaf axils.

== Description ==
Homoranthus tricolor is an upright, spreading shrub to 1.4 m (4 ft 7 in) high. It has grey, slightly lined, fibrous bark near the base of older plants. The leaves are linear to narrowly oblong-lance shaped, 5.3–7.2 mm (0.21–0.28 in) long, 0.6–0.9 mm (0.024–0.035 in) wide, green to grey-green, distinct occasional oil glands, margins entire, apex acute or ending in a sharp short point, and the petiole 0.5–0.7 mm (0.020–0.028 in) long. The inflorescence consists usually of one or rarely two flowers borne in upper leaf axils, bracts usually green with white or red margins, 6–7 mm (0.24–0.28 in) long, 5.3–5.8 mm (0.21–0.23 in) wide with a rounded apex. The pendulous, cylindrical shaped flowers have elliptic-shaped dark purple to black petals near the base, light green on the margins and toward the apex. Each of the five black sepals are 5–6 mm (0.20–0.24 in) long and 1.2–1.5 mm (0.047–0.059 in) wide. The creamy-white styles are 18–20 mm (0.71–0.79 in) long, straight or curved toward the end. There have been sightings of flowers in September only, but may flower into October.

== Taxonomy and naming ==
Homoranthus tricolor was first formally described in 2009 by Anthony Bean from a specimen he collected south-west of Mundubbera in 2008. The description was published in Austrobaileya. The specific epithet (tricolor) refers to the three-coloured flowers.

== Distribution and habitat ==
This homoranthus grows in shrubby woodland on a sandstone ridge. It is only known from a single population near Mundubbera.

== Conservation status ==
A rare species, currently known from a single population which is subjected to occasional grazing. Criteria of Briggs and Leigh (1996) a ROTAP conservation code of 2E appropriate. IUCN (2010) considered endangered.
