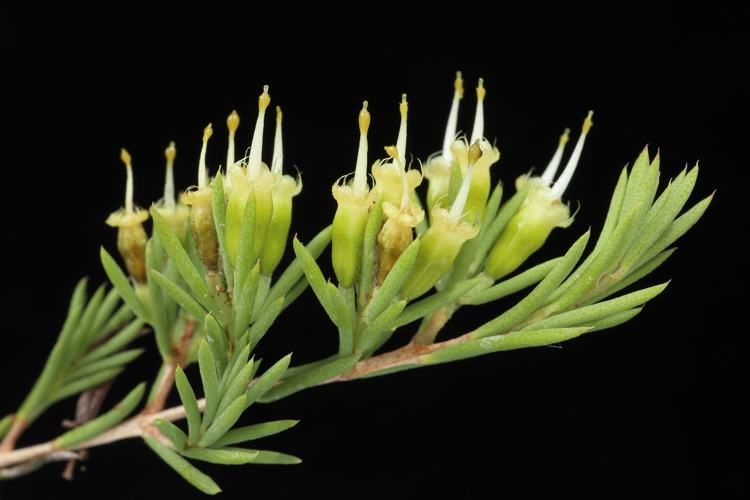
- Homoranthus melanostictus in the ANBG

Scientific classification
- Kingdom: Plantae
- Clade: Tracheophytes
- Clade: Angiosperms
- Clade: Eudicots
- Clade: Rosids
- Order: Myrtales
- Family: Myrtaceae
- Genus: Homoranthus
- Species: H. melanostictus

Binomial name
- Homoranthus melanostictus Craven & S.R.Jones
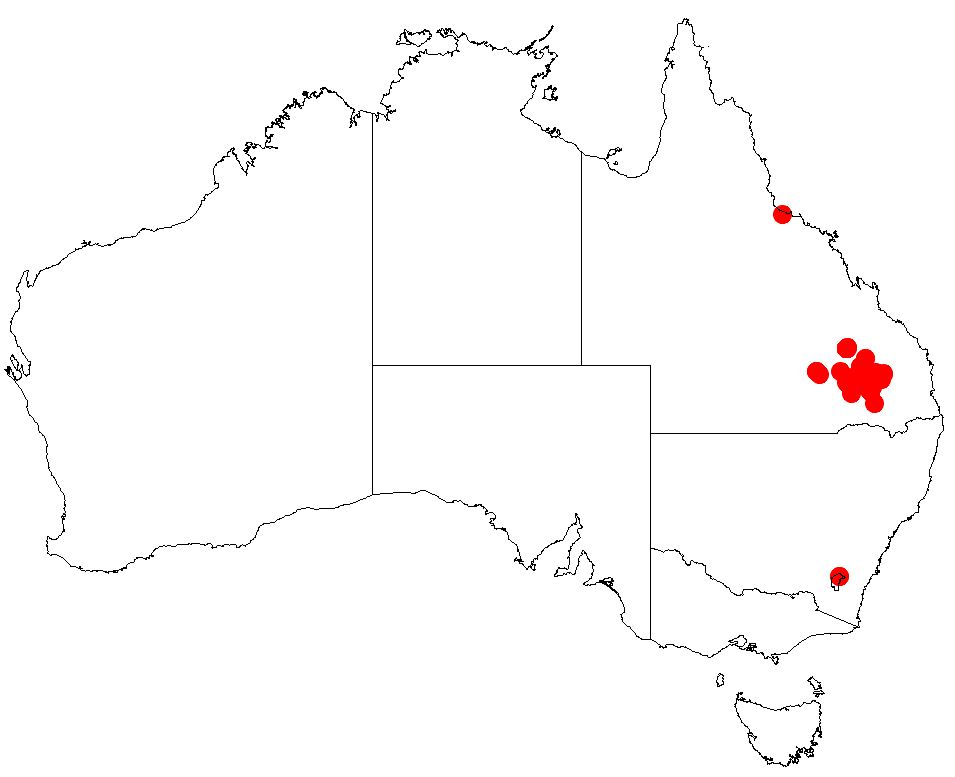
- Occurrence data from AVH

= Homoranthus melanostictus =

Species of flowering plant

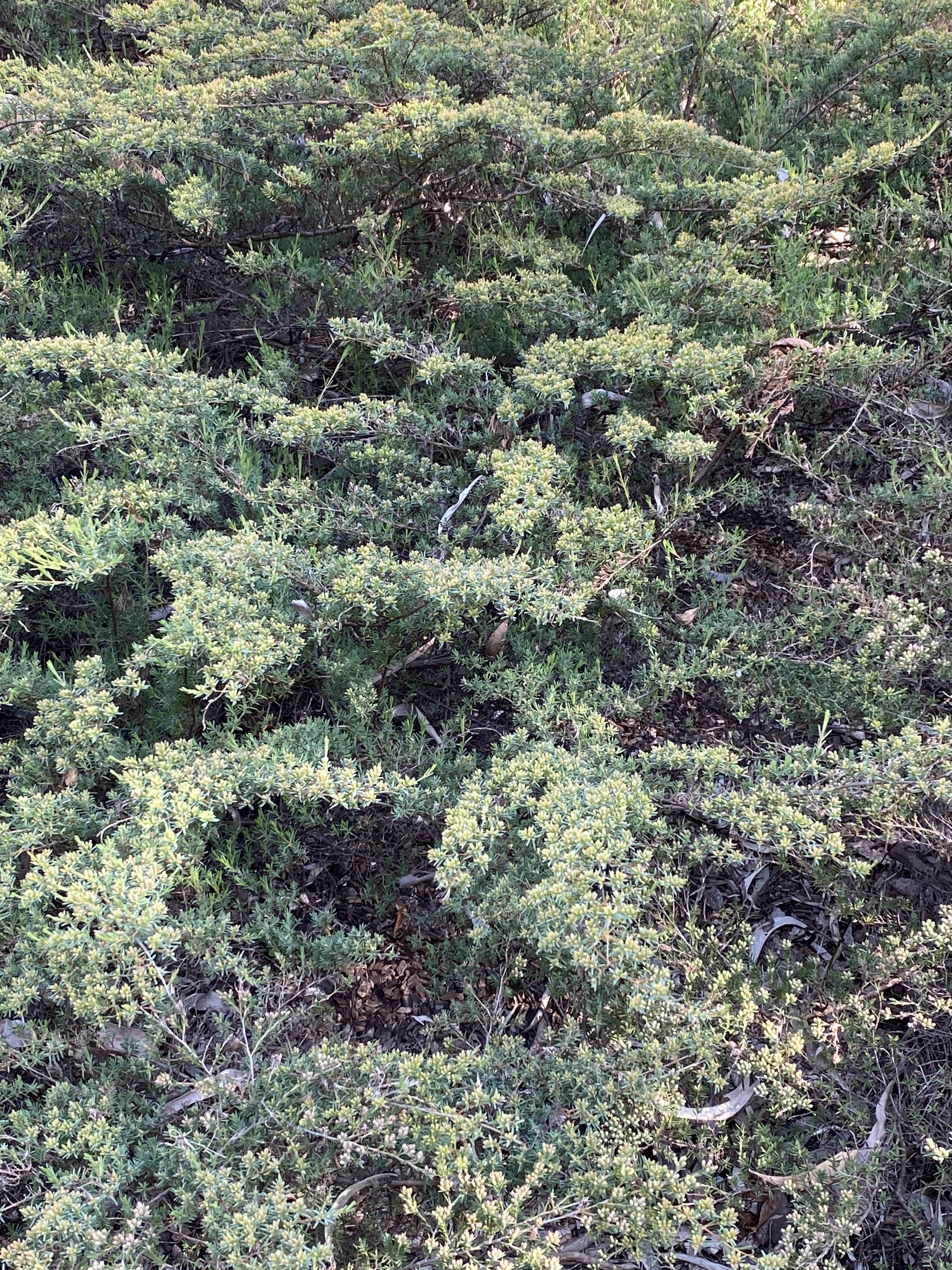
Habit

Homoranthus melanostictus is a flowering plant in the family Myrtaceae and is endemic to eastern Australia. It has cylinder-shaped to flattened leaves with blackish oil dots and up to six yellow flowers arranged in leaf axils near the ends of the branchlets.

== Description ==
Homoranthus melanostictus is a prostrate, glabrous shrub to 0.1 m (0.3 ft) high with branches that arch upwards at the apex. The leaves are needle-shaped to flattened, green, mostly 3.5–7 mm (0.14–0.28 in) long, 0.3–0.8 mm (0.012–0.031 in) wide, thick, and dark distinct oil spots. The yellow flowers are in groups of one to six on branches, peduncles 1.5–2.5 mm (0.059–0.098 in) long, bracteoles 2.5–4 mm (0.098–0.157 in) long that fall off as the flower opens. The floral tube is narrowly conical, 5 ribbed, 2.8–3.5 mm (0.11–0.14 in) long, smooth, petals broadly egg-shaped, 0.5–1 mm (0.020–0.039 in) long and the style exceeding the petals by 3–7 mm (0.12–0.28 in).

== Taxonomy and naming ==
Homoranthus melanostictus was first formally described in 1991 by Lyndley Craven and S.R Jones and the description was published in Australian Systematic Botany. The specific epithet (melanostictus) is derived from the Ancient Greek words melas meaning "black" or "dark" and stiktos meaning "punctured", "dappled" or "spotted".

== Distribution and habitat ==
Widely spread in south-eastern Queensland from north west of Taroom to south of Tara. Grows on sandy soils in shrubby woodland and heath.

== Conservation status ==
A widespread and sometimes common species. Poorly reserved, ROTAP conservation code 3RC using Briggs and Leigh (1996).
