= Homoranthus cernuus =

Wollemi homoranthus

Scientific classification
- Kingdom: Plantae
- Clade: Tracheophytes
- Clade: Angiosperms
- Clade: Eudicots
- Clade: Rosids
- Order: Myrtales
- Family: Myrtaceae
- Genus: Homoranthus
- Species: H. cernuus

Binomial name
- Homoranthus cernuus (R.T.Baker) Craven & S.R.Jones
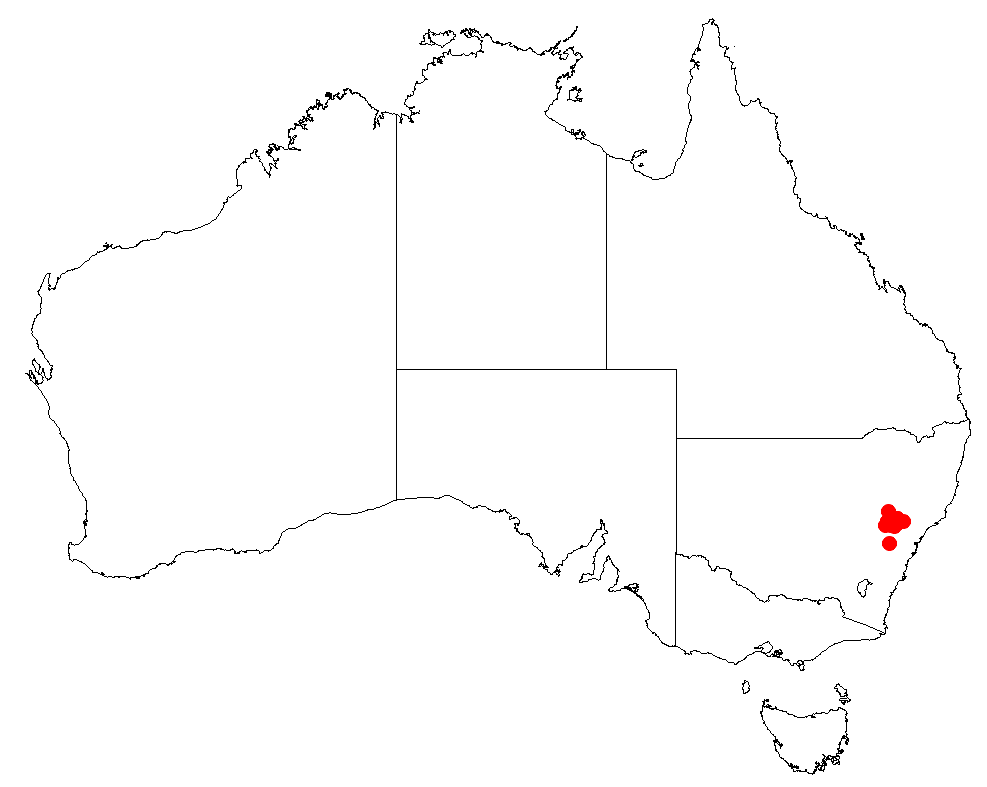
- Occurrence data from AVH

Synonyms
- Rylstonea cernua R.T.Baker

Species of flowering plant

Homoranthus cernuus commonly known as Wollemi homoranthus, is a flowering plant in the family Myrtaceae and is endemic to a small area in the Wollemi National Park. It is a slender shrub with smooth, linear shaped leaves and pairs of pendulous cream-coloured flowers with a pinkish base.

== Description ==
Homoranthus cernuus is an upright, smooth, slender shrub to 30–60 cm (12–24 in) high. The leaves are arranged in crowded, opposite pairs, either terete or laterally compressed and tapering at the apex and narrowing toward the short leaf stalk. The pendant flowers are cream coloured with a pink base on an arching pedicel 2–3.4 mm (0.079–0.134 in) long and mostly in pairs. Flowers have a single bract about 3.4 mm (0.13 in) long between the two pedicels. The small bracts are thin, dry and cover the flower bud and remain until the flower petals are fully opened. The cylindrical floral tube is 11.3–13.5 mm (0.44–0.53 in) long, has 5 prominent ribs and the styles projected well below the petals and twice the length of the floral tube. Flowers and fruits sporadically throughout the year but primarily in spring and summer. This species is closely related to H. darwinoides but has longer leaves and larger flowers.

== Taxonomy ==
Homoranthus cernuus was first formally described in 1889 by Richard Thomas Baker who gave it the name Rylstonea cernua from a specimen collected from Mount Coricudgy. The description was published in Proceedings of the Linnean Society of New South Wales. In 1991 Lyndley Craven and S.R.Jones changed the name to Homoranthus cernuus and the name change was published in Australian Systematic Botany.

== Distribution and habitat ==
This species has a restricted distribution and is endemic to the north-western section of Wollemi National Park in central New South Wales. It occurs on Narrabeen sandstone, shallow sandy soils in layered woodland or heath, usually on steep rocky terrain in dry open forests.

== Conservation status ==
Uncommon and restricted in distribution, but well reserved in Wollemi National Park. Listed as a rare species by Briggs and Leigh (1996) with a ROTAP conservation 2RCa.
