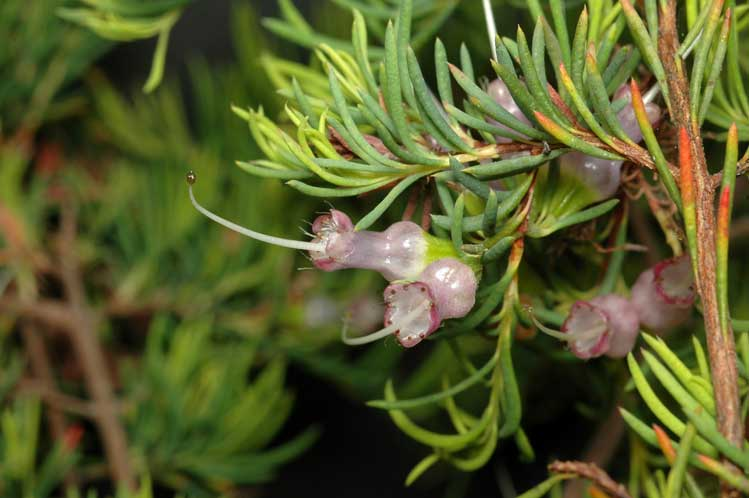
- In the ANBG

Scientific classification
- Kingdom: Plantae
- Clade: Tracheophytes
- Clade: Angiosperms
- Clade: Eudicots
- Clade: Rosids
- Order: Myrtales
- Family: Myrtaceae
- Genus: Homoranthus
- Species: H. decasetus

Binomial name
- Homoranthus decasetus Byrnes
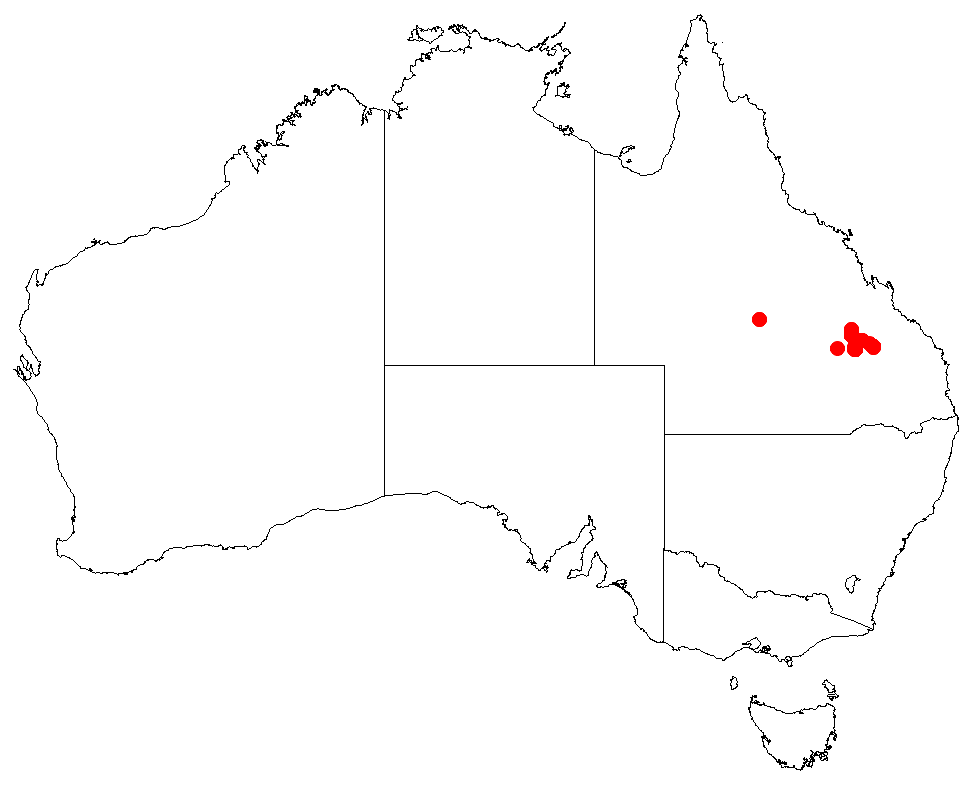
- Occurrence data from AVH

= Homoranthus decasetus =

Species of flowering plant

Homoranthus decasetus is a plant in the myrtle family Myrtaceae and is endemic to a small area in central Queensland. It has small, thin leaves and flowers that fade to purple as they age.

== Description ==
Homoranthus decasetus is an upright shrub that typically grows to a height of 2 m (6 ft 7 in). The leaves are arranged in opposite pair and are club-shaped, curved, circular in cross-section, up to 12 mm (0.47 in) long and about 1 mm (0.039 in) wide. The flower are arranged singly on short branchlets in leaf axils. The flower buds have bracteoles up to 3 mm (0.12 in) long at their base and that fall off as the flower develops. The calyx tube is urn-shaped, with five ribs on the outside. Each of the five sepals has two bristles up to 4 mm (0.16 in) long on its tip. The petals are round, about 2 mm (0.079 in) in diameter and ten stamens alternate with ten staminodes that are attached to the base of the calyx. As the flowers age they turn from white to red or purple. The fruit is about the same size as the flower and contains a single winged seed. Flowering and fruiting occur sporadically throughout the year.

== Taxonomy and naming ==
Homoranthus decasetus was first formally described in 1981 by Norman Byrnes from a specimen collected in Isla Gorge in 1977 and the description was published in Austrobaileya. This species of Homoranthus has ten bristles on the tips of the calyx.

== Distribution and habitat ==
Restricted to area between Rolleston, Theodore and Taroom in central Queensland. Grows usually in rocky woodland on shallow sandy soils.

== Conservation status ==
An uncommon species but well reserved in several national parks. ROTAP conservation code of 3RCa using Briggs and Leigh (1996)
