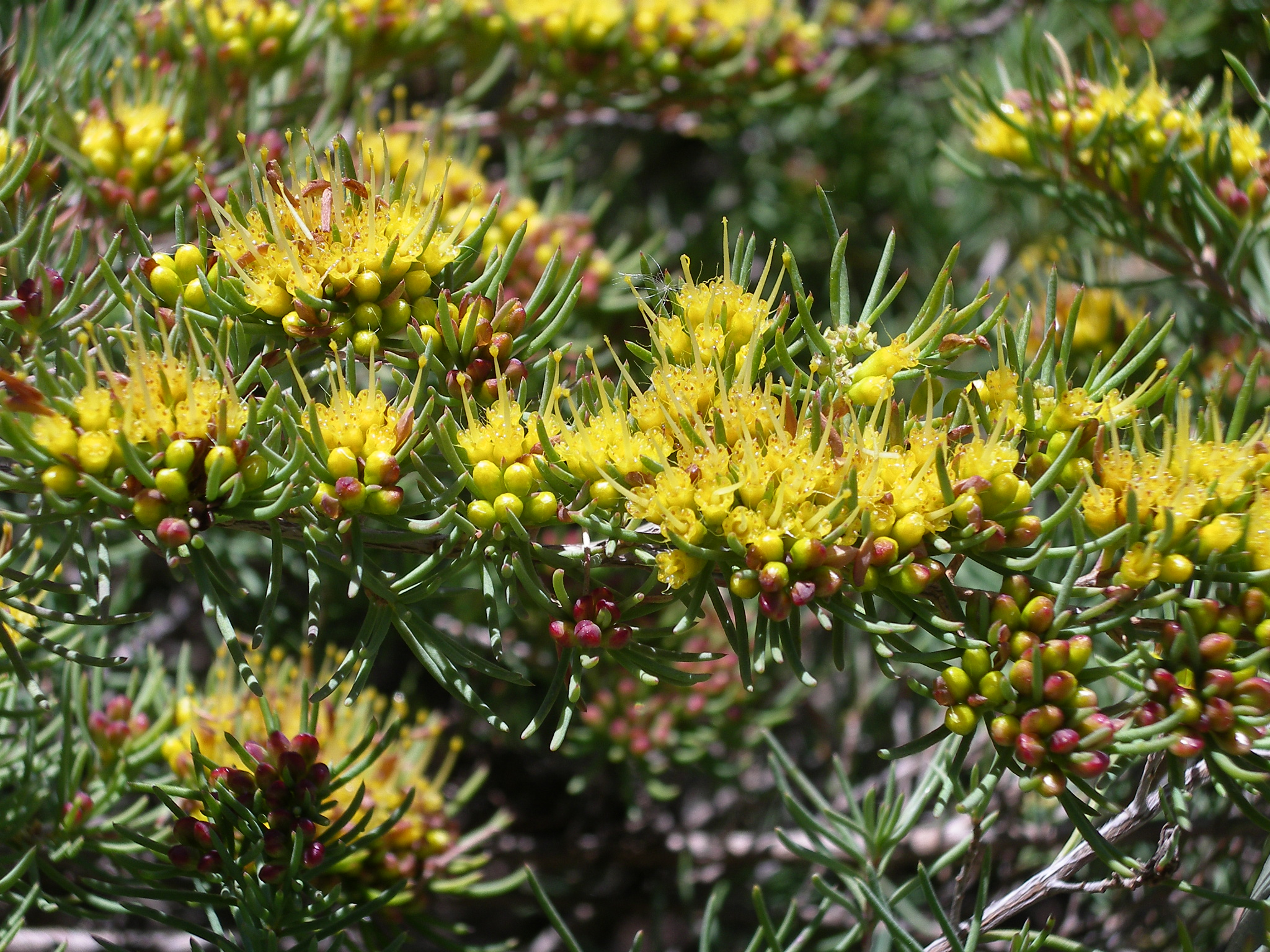
- Homoranthus flavescens

Scientific classification
- Kingdom: Plantae
- Clade: Tracheophytes
- Clade: Angiosperms
- Clade: Eudicots
- Clade: Rosids
- Order: Myrtales
- Family: Myrtaceae
- Subfamily: Myrtoideae
- Tribe: Chamelaucieae
- Genus: Homoranthus; A.Cunn. ex Schauer

Synonyms
- Chamaelaucium sect. Schnermannia F.Muell. orth. var.; Chamelaucium sect. Schuermannia F.Muell.; Darwinia sect. Homoranthus (A.Cunn. ex Schauer) Kuntze; Darwinia sect. Schuermannia (F.Muell.) Benth. & Hook.f. nom. superfl.; Darwinia sect. Schuermannia (F.Muell.) Benth.; Rylstonea R.T.Baker; Schuermannia F.Muell.

= Homoranthus =

Genus of flowering plants

Homoranthus is a genus of about thirty species of plants in the myrtle family Myrtaceae and all are endemic to Australia. Plants in this genus share similarities with those in both Darwinia and Verticordia. They are shrubs with their leaves arranged in opposite pairs and with flowers appearing either singly or in small groups, usually in upper leaf axils. They are found in Queensland, New South Wales and South Australia. The genus was first described in 1836. None of the species is common nor are they well-known in horticulture.

== Description ==
Plants in the genus Homoranthus are shrubs with their leaves arranged in opposite pairs, at right angles to the ones above and below (decussate) so that the leaves are in four rows along the stems. They are linear to cylindrical in shape, sometimes thicker than wide. The flowers are arranged singly or in groups of up to four in the upper leaf axils. There are five sepals and five petals which are enclosed in two bracteoles before the flower opens, and which surround the base of the style. There are ten stamens alternating with ten staminodes. The style extends beyond the petals and has a ring of hairs below its tip. The fruit is a capsule containing one or two seeds.

The Australian botanist Norman Byrnes has noted that Homoranthus "is not a clearly defined natural group but is more a genus of convenience between Darwinia and Verticordia. In 1869, George Bentham wrote "Its retention [as a separate genus] may, however, be justified as facilitating the distinction between Darwinia and Verticordia".

== Taxonomy and naming ==
The genus Homoranthus was first formally described in 1836 by Johannes Conrad Schauer after an unpublished description by Allan Cunningham. Schauer's description was published in Linnaea: ein Journal für die Botanik in ihrem ganzen Umfange, oder Beiträge zur Pflanzenkunde. The genus name (Homoranthus) is derived from the Ancient Greek words homos meaning "same", "uniform", "like" or "similar" and anthos meaning "flower".

=== Species ===
The following is a list of species accepted by the Australian Plant Census as at January 2020:

- Homoranthus bebo L.M.Copel. (N.S.W.)
- Homoranthus biflorus Craven & S.R.Jones (N.S.W.)
- Homoranthus binghiensis J.T.Hunter. (N.S.W)
- Homoranthus brevistylis L.M.Copel. (Qld.)
- Homoranthus bruhlii L.M.Copel. (N.S.W.)
- Homoranthus cernuus (R.T.Baker) Craven & S.R.Jones (N.S.W.)
- Homoranthus clarksonii L.M.Copel. (Qld.)
- Homoranthus coracinus A.R.Bean (Qld.)
- Homoranthus croftianus J.T.Hunter (N.S.W.)
- Homoranthus cummingii L.M.Copel. (Qld.)
- Homoranthus darwinioides (Maiden & Betche) Cheel (N.S.W.)
- Homoranthus decasetus Byrnes (Qld.)
- Homoranthus decumbens (Byrnes) Craven & S.R.Jones (Qld.)
- Homoranthus elusus L.M.Copel. (N.S.W.)
- Homoranthus flavescens A.Cunn. ex Schauer (N.S.W.)
- Homoranthus floydii Craven & S.R.Jones (N.S.W.)
- Homoranthus homoranthoides (F.Muell.) Craven & S.R.Jones (S.A.)
- Homoranthus inopinatus L.M.Copel., J.Holmes & G.Holmes (N.S.W.)
- Homoranthus lunatus Craven & S.R.Jones (N.S.W.)
- Homoranthus melanostictus Craven & S.R.Jones (N.S.W.)
- Homoranthus montanus Craven & S.R.Jones (Qld.)
- Homoranthus papillatus Byrnes (Qld.)
- Homoranthus porteri (C.T.White) Craven & S.R.Jones (Qld.)
- Homoranthus prolixus Craven & S.R.Jones (N.S.W.)
- Homoranthus thomasii (F.Muell.) Craven & S.R.Jones (Qld.)
- Homoranthus tricolor A.R.Bean (Qld.)
- Homoranthus tropicus Byrnes (Qld.)
- Homoranthus vagans L.M.Copel. (Qld.)
- Homoranthus virgatus A.Cunn. ex Schauer (N.S.W., Qld.)
- Homoranthus wilhelmii (F.Muell.) Cheel (S.A.)
- Homoranthus zeteticorum Craven & S.R.Jones (N.S.W.)
