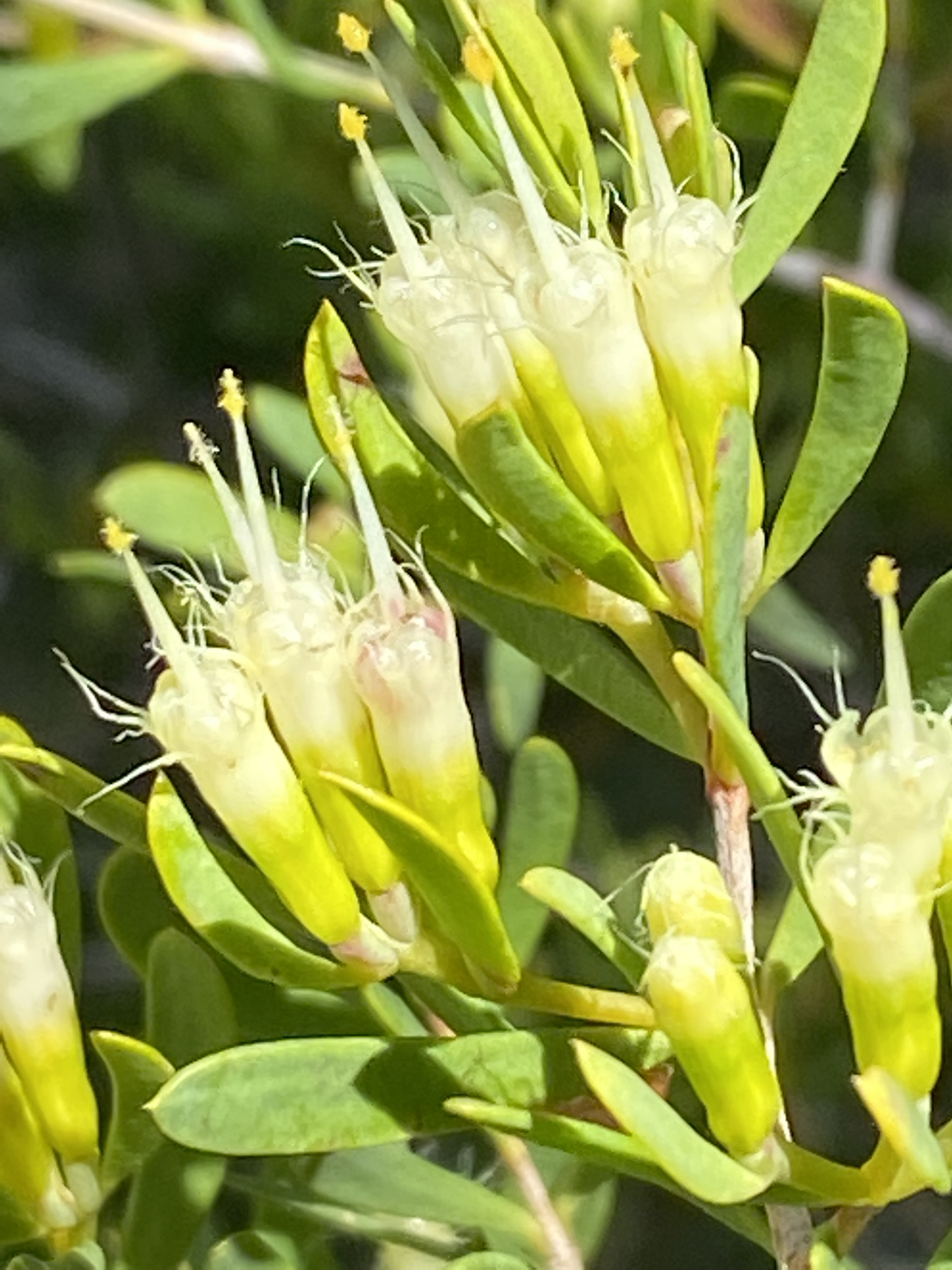

Scientific classification
- Kingdom: Plantae
- Clade: Tracheophytes
- Clade: Angiosperms
- Clade: Eudicots
- Clade: Rosids
- Order: Myrtales
- Family: Myrtaceae
- Genus: Homoranthus
- Species: H. binghiensis

Binomial name
- Homoranthus binghiensis J.T.Hunter
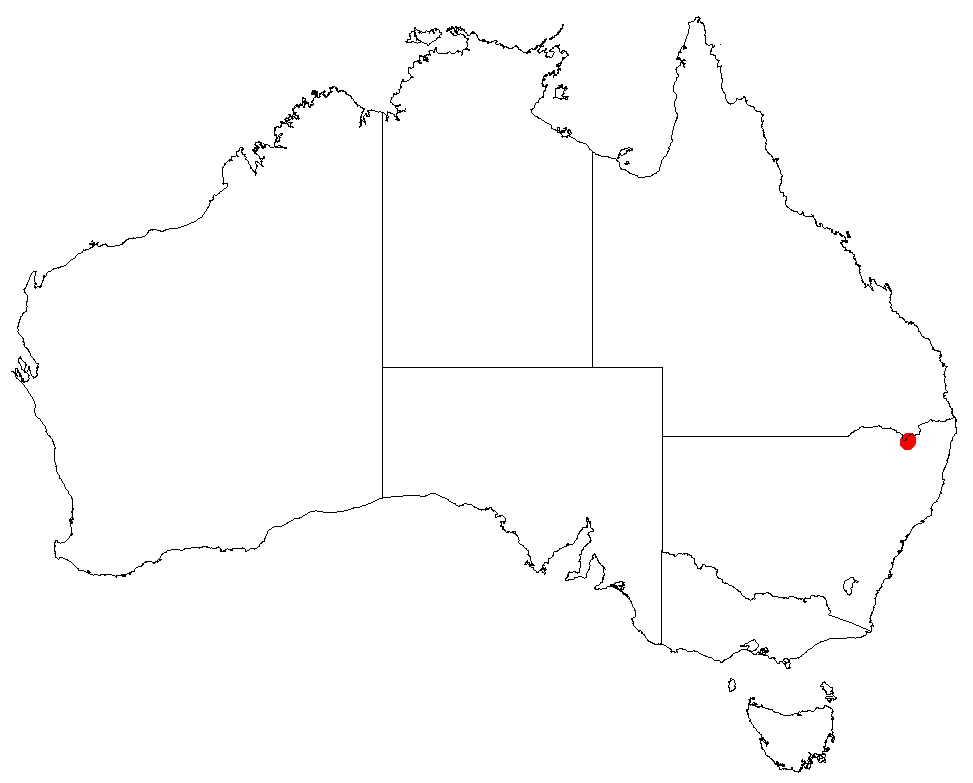
- Occurrence data from AVH

= Homoranthus binghiensis =

Species of flowering plant

Homoranthus binghiensis is a flowering plant in the family Myrtaceae and is endemic to a small area in northern New South Wales. It is an upright shrub with pointed leaves and usually paired yellowish to red flowers.

== Description ==
Homoranthus binghiensis is an upright shrub to 3 m (9.8 ft) high, and 2 m (6 ft 7 in) wide with orange-yellow stems when young, turning darker as they age. The leaves are arranged opposite, decussate, lime-green to compressed more or less narrowly oblong-lance shaped, 7–26 mm (0.28–1.02 in) long, 1.5–3 mm (0.059–0.118 in) wide and less than 1.3–2.6 mm (0.051–0.102 in) thick on a petiole about 1 mm (0.039 in) long, and pointed at the apex. The flowers are usually yellow, occasionally red or green-yellow, borne singly, bracteoles 5–6 mm (0.20–0.24 in) long, and peduncles 0.5–1 mm (0.020–0.039 in) long. The petals more or less broadly oval-shaped, 1.4–2.5 mm (0.055–0.098 in) long, 1.4–1.8 mm (0.055–0.071 in) wide with smooth margins. Flowering occurs from November to December and the fruit is a dry, reddish-brown nut, 4.4–7 mm (0.17–0.28 in) long and 1.5–2.4 mm (0.059–0.094 in) wide.

== Taxonomy and naming ==
Homoranthus binghiensis was first formally described in 2011 by John Hunter and Lachlan Copeland from a specimen collected in the Torrington State Recreation Area in 2000. The description was published in Telopea. The specific epithet (binghiensis) refers to the Permian sedimentary rocks in the Torrington area that have been known as binghi.

== Distribution and habitat ==
This species grows at higher altitudes and is restricted to an area north-west of Torrington in northern New South Wales where it grows on shallow sandy soils in heath and shrubby woodland on or adjacent to granite outcrops.

== Conservation status ==
This homoranthus is sometimes locally common, but known from only five or six populations and is classified as "endangered" under the New South Wales Government Threatened Species Conservation Act 1995. It is classified "vulnerable" and given a conservation code of 2VCt by Hunter and Copeland (2001).
