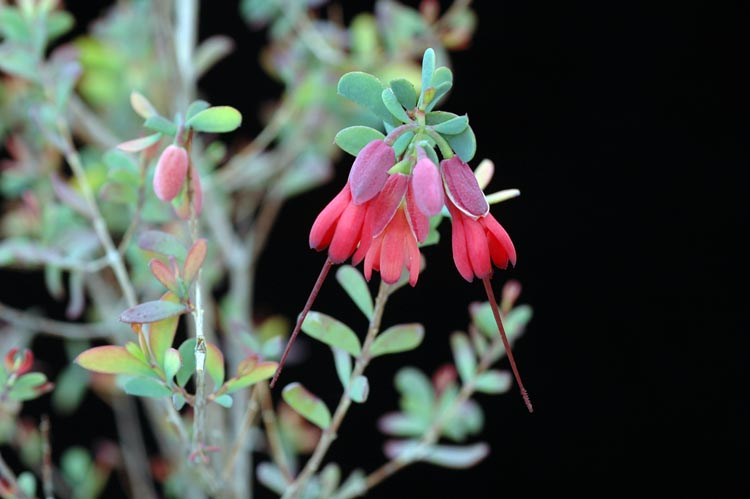
- Homoranthus zeteticorum in the ANBG

Scientific classification
- Kingdom: Plantae
- Clade: Tracheophytes
- Clade: Angiosperms
- Clade: Eudicots
- Clade: Rosids
- Order: Myrtales
- Family: Myrtaceae
- Genus: Homoranthus
- Species: H. zeteticorum

Binomial name
- Homoranthus zeteticorum Craven & S.R.Jones
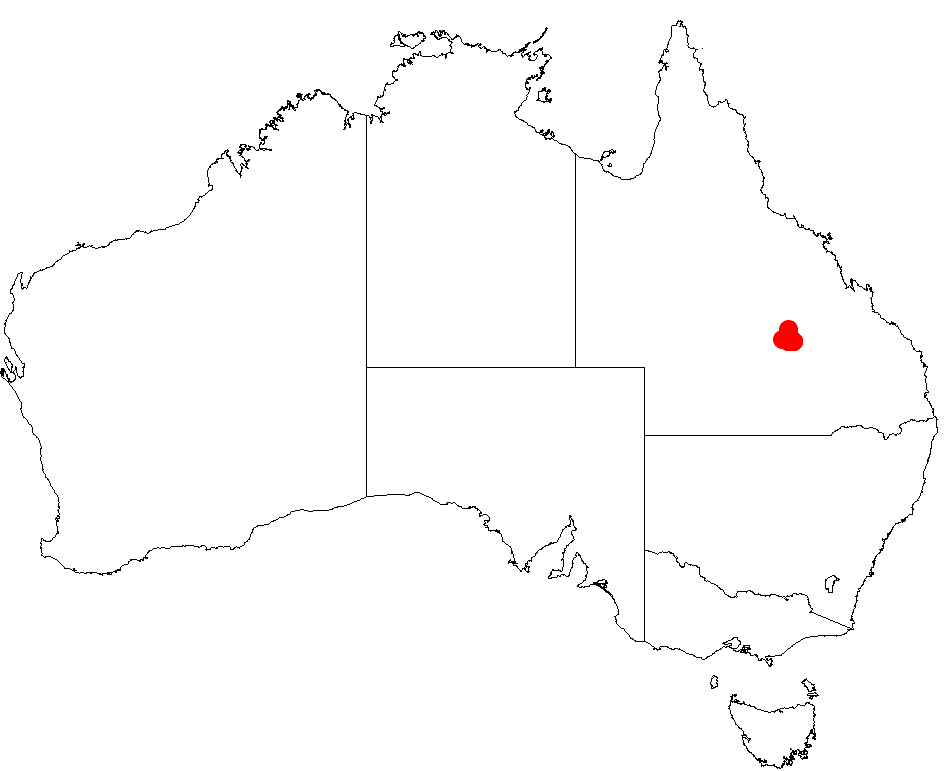
- Occurrence data from AVH

= Homoranthus zeteticorum =

Species of flowering plant

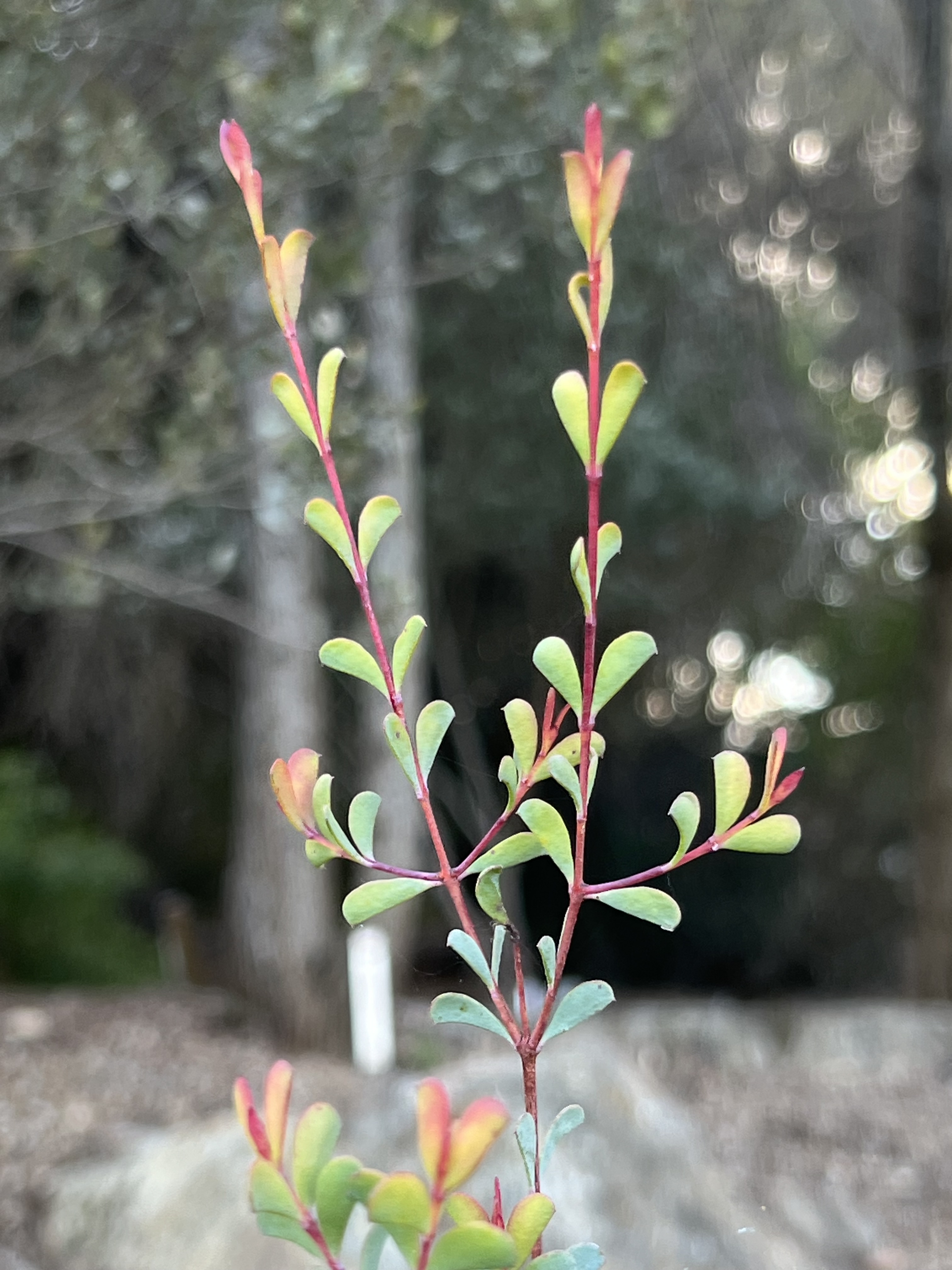
Foliage

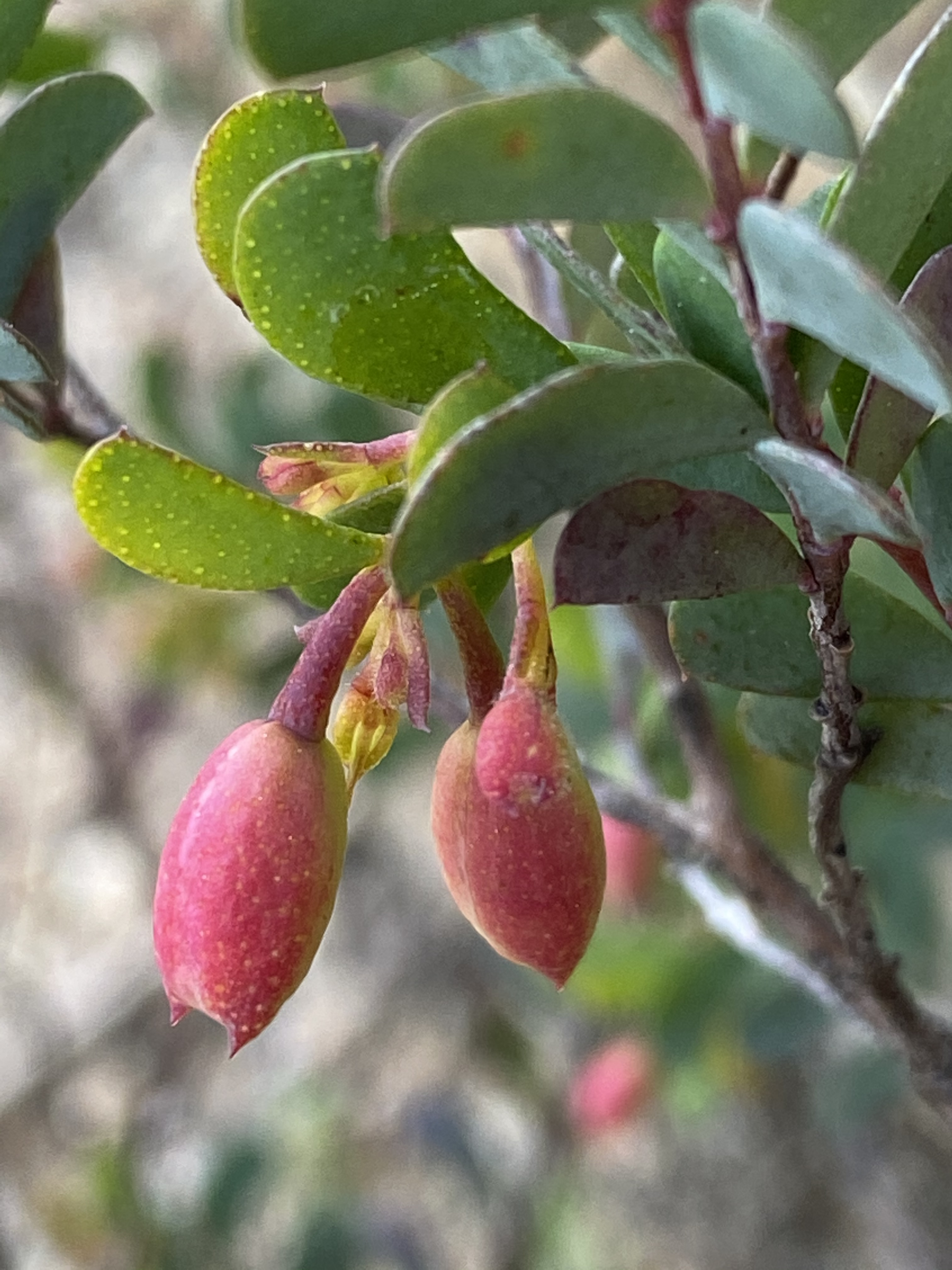
Flower buds

Homoranthus zeteticorum is a flowering plant in the family Myrtaceae and is endemic to a small area in central Queensland. It is a tall shrub with axehead-shaped leaves and pendulous flowers with darker styles.

== Description ==
Homoranthus zeteticorum is an upright shrub, the leaves are arranged opposite on a short petiole. The flowers are red, sepals red, 3–4 mm (0.12–0.16 in) long and the styles black and 22–30 mm (0.87–1.18 in) long. Flowering occurs sporadically throughout the year and the fruit is a one-seeded nut.

== Taxonomy and naming ==
Homoranthus zeteticorum was first formally described in 1991 by Lyndley Craven and Sandra Raelene Jones and the description was published in Australian Systematic Botany. The specific epithet (zeteticorum) is from the Greek zetetikos, meaning "disposed to research", latinised and given the genitive plural form, meaning "in honour of persons who, for their enjoyment, explore natural vegetation".

== Distribution and habitat ==
This homoranthus grows in shrubby woodland and heath on shallow, sandy soils derived from sandstone. It is only known from the Salvator Rosa section of Carnarvon National Park where it grows on Homoranthus Hill.

== Conservation status ==
Homoranthus zeteticorum is considered a rare species with a restricted distribution. ROTAP conservation code 2RC-, Briggs and Leigh (1996).
