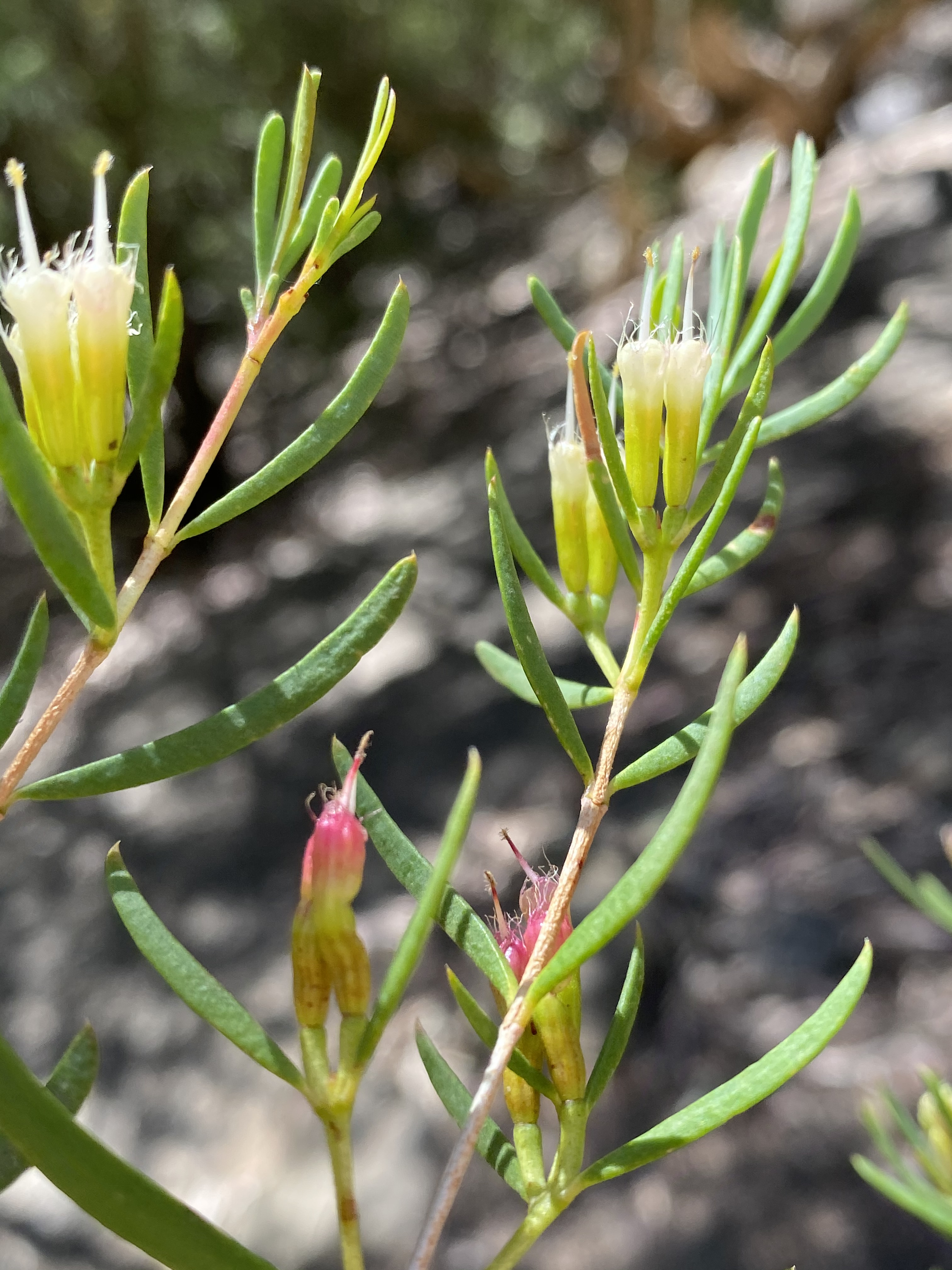
- Homoranthus prolixus in the ANBG

Conservation status
- Vulnerable (EPBC Act)

Scientific classification
- Kingdom: Plantae
- Clade: Tracheophytes
- Clade: Angiosperms
- Clade: Eudicots
- Clade: Rosids
- Order: Myrtales
- Family: Myrtaceae
- Genus: Homoranthus
- Species: H. prolixus

Binomial name
- Homoranthus prolixus Craven & S.R.Jones
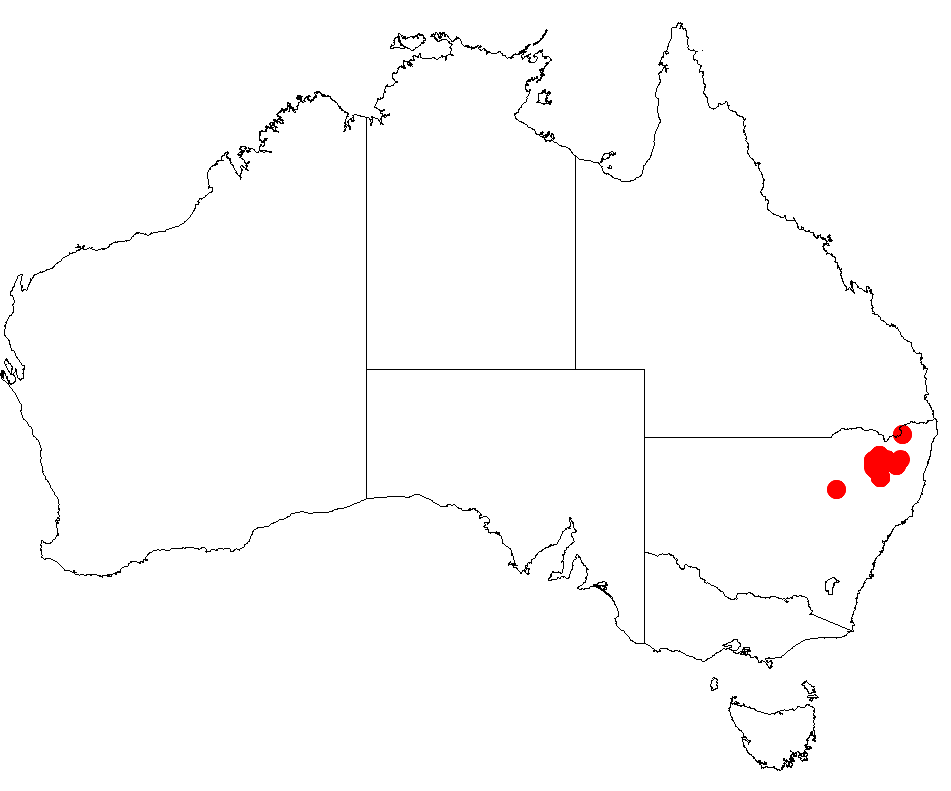
- Occurrence data from AVH

Synonyms
- Homoranthus bornhardtiensis J.T.Hunter

= Homoranthus prolixus =

Granite homoranthus

Species of flowering plant

Homoranthus prolixus, commonly known as granite homoranthus is a flowering plant in the family Myrtaceae and is endemic to northern New South Wales. It is a spreading shrub with linear to lance-shaped leaves and groups of up to six yellow to red flowers in the upper leaf axils.

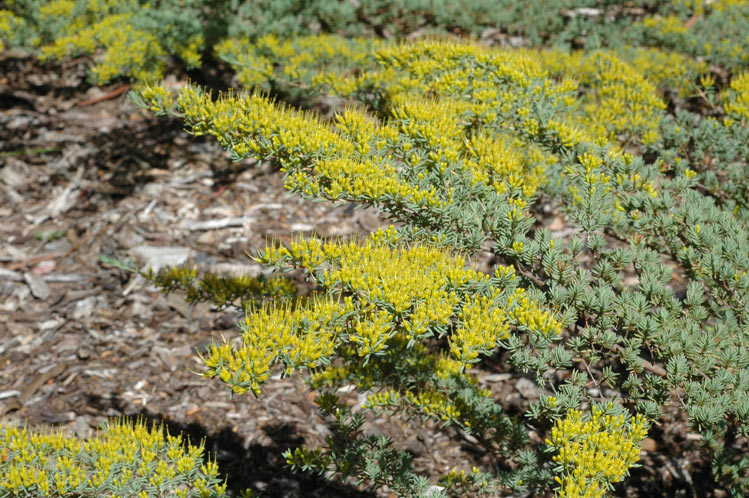
Habit in the ANBG

== Description ==
Homoranthus prolixus is a spreading shrub to 0.8 m (2 ft 7 in) high with a mostly ascending growth habit, and branches that arch upwards at the apex. The dull, blue-green leaves have a whitish bloom, decussate, linear to oblong-lance shaped, 3–6 mm (0.12–0.24 in) long, 0.5–1 mm (0.020–0.039 in) wide, upper surface flat or occasionally concave, more or less smooth and gradually tapering to a point on a petiole 0.5 mm (0.020 in) long. The one to six yellow to red flowers are borne on upper branches, about 5 mm (0.20 in) long, petals broadly egg-shaped, 0.8–1.5 mm (0.031–0.059 in) long, floral tube five ribbed, smooth, 3–4 mm (0.12–0.16 in) long, style 8–10 mm (0.31–0.39 in) long, and the peduncle 1–2 mm (0.039–0.079 in) long. Flowering occurs from September to December and fruits from September to January.

== Taxonomy and naming ==
Homoranthus prolixus was first formally described in 1991 by Lyndley Craven and S.R.Jones and the description was published in Australian Systematic Botany. The specific epithet (prolixus) is a Latin word meaning "stretched out" or "long".

== Distribution and habit ==
Granite homoranthus grows from Inverell to Bendemeer in northern New South Wales in woodland and heath on shallow sandy soils on and around granite or acid volcanic outcrops.

== Conservation status ==
This homoranthus is considered vulnerable by Briggs and Leigh (1996), but now known to be well reserved and often locally abundant. The Rare or Threatened Australian Plants conservation code of 3RCa is considered more appropriate.
