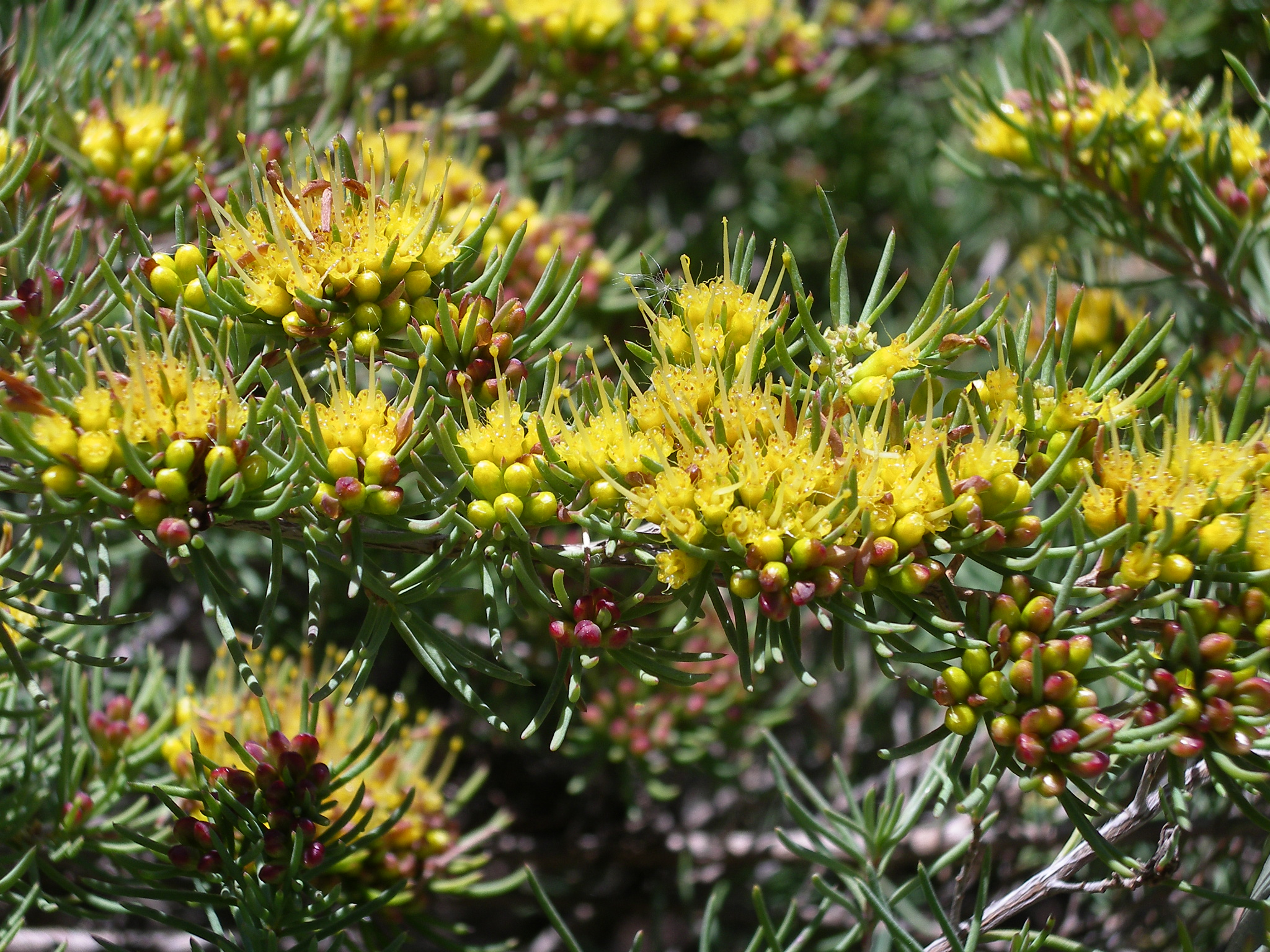

Scientific classification
- Kingdom: Plantae
- Clade: Tracheophytes
- Clade: Angiosperms
- Clade: Eudicots
- Clade: Rosids
- Order: Myrtales
- Family: Myrtaceae
- Genus: Homoranthus
- Species: H. flavescens

Binomial name
- Homoranthus flavescens A.Cunn. ex Schauer
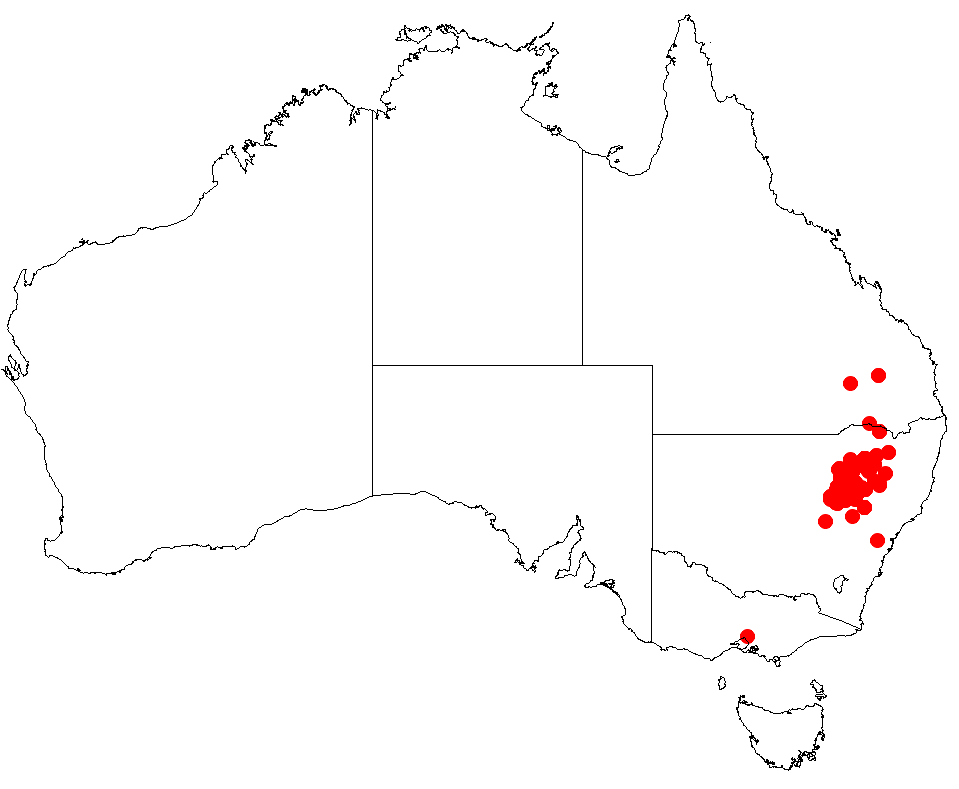
- Occurrence data from AVH

Synonyms
- Darwinia flavescens A.Cunn. ex Schauer; Enosanthes flavescens A.Cunn. ex Schauer

= Homoranthus flavescens =

Species of flowering plant

Homoranthus flavescens is a plant in the myrtle family Myrtaceae and is endemic to northern New South Wales. It is a low, spreading, flat-topped shrub with cylinder-shaped or flattened leaves. Single yellow to reddish flowers appear in leaf axils in late spring and summer, forming clusters near the end of the branchlets.

== Description ==
Homoranthus flavescens grow to 0.5 metres high and 1 metre in width and have leaves are 6 to 10 mm long and up to 1.5 mm in width. Yellow flowers appear in late spring and summer. Fruits September-December.

== Taxonomy and naming ==
Homoranthus flavescens was first formally described in 1843 by Johannes Conrad Schauer from an unpublished description by Allan Cunningham. The description was published in Monographia Myrtacearum Xerocarpicarum. The specific epithet (flavescens) is the incipient form of the Latin word flavus meaning "yellow" or "golden yellow".

== Distribution and habitat ==
Grows from Yetman in far northern New South Wales to Dubbo and Merriwa districts. Grows most commonly on sandstone in shrubby woodland or heath.

== Conservation status ==
Widespread, often locally common and well reserved.
