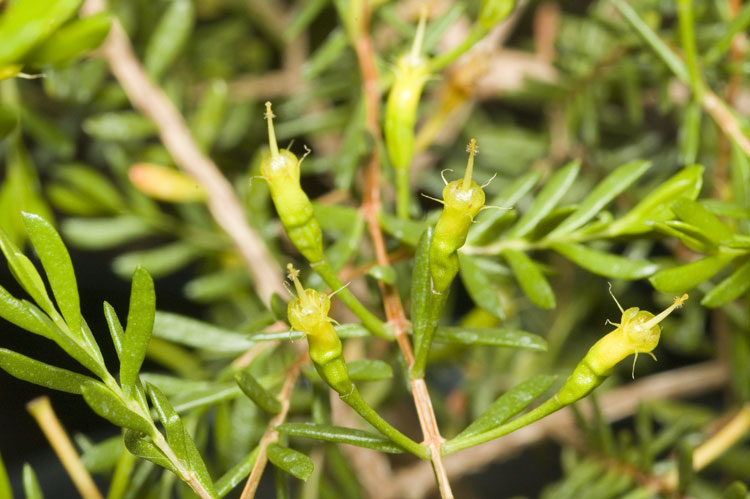
- Homoranthus floydii in the ANBG

Scientific classification
- Kingdom: Plantae
- Clade: Tracheophytes
- Clade: Angiosperms
- Clade: Eudicots
- Clade: Rosids
- Order: Myrtales
- Family: Myrtaceae
- Genus: Homoranthus
- Species: H. floydii

Binomial name
- Homoranthus floydii Craven & S.R.Jones
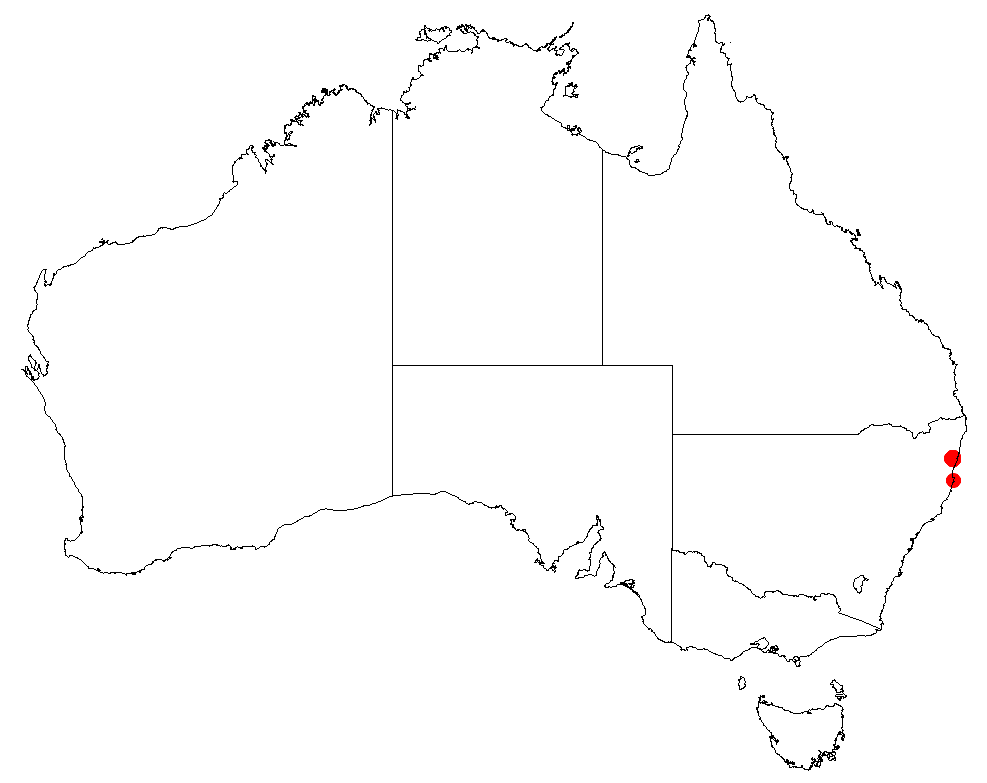
- Occurrence data from AVH

= Homoranthus floydii =

Species of flowering plant

Homoranthus floydii is a plant in the myrtle family Myrtaceae and is endemic to New South Wales.

== Description ==
Homoranthus floydii is easily distinguished from all other species of Homoranthus by its erect habit, shiny leaves that appear more pointed near the stem and rounded at the tip, long gaps between leaf nodes and particularly long flower stems. Flowering occurs from August to November and fruits mature from September to December.

== Taxonomy and naming ==
Homoranthus floydii was first formally described in 1991 by Lyndley Craven and S.R Jones and the description was published in Australian Systematic Botany. The specific epithet (floydii) honours the Australian botanist, Alexander Floyd.

== Distribution and habitat ==
This species is endemic to the Glenreagh district of north-eastern New South Wales, where it grows on shallow rocky soils derived from sandstone in shrubby woodland.

== Conservation status ==
Homoranthus floydii is listed as "vulnerable" under the New South Wales Government Biodiversity Conservation Act 2016.
