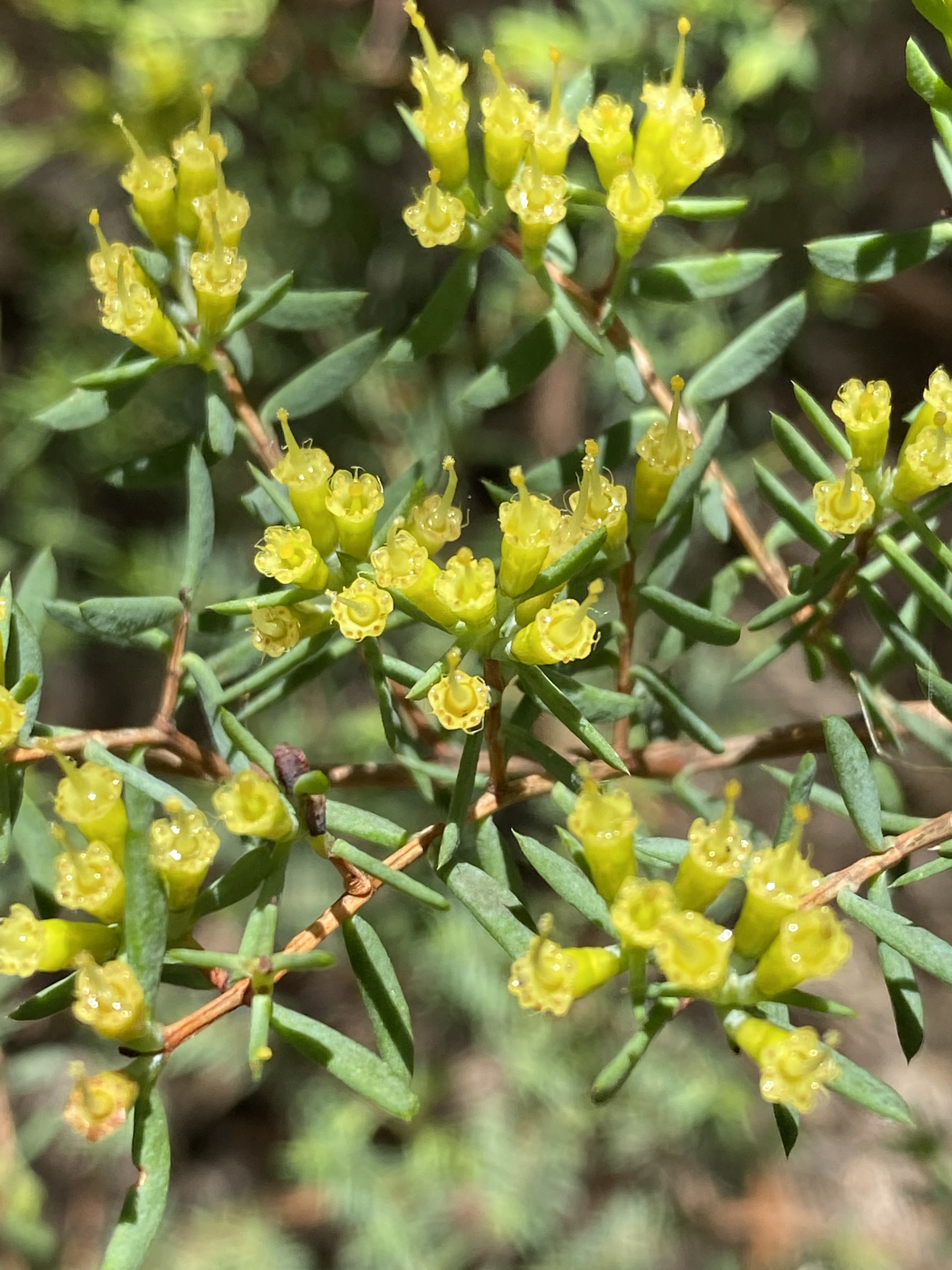
- In the ANBG

Scientific classification
- Kingdom: Plantae
- Clade: Tracheophytes
- Clade: Angiosperms
- Clade: Eudicots
- Clade: Rosids
- Order: Myrtales
- Family: Myrtaceae
- Genus: Homoranthus
- Species: H. lunatus

Binomial name
- Homoranthus lunatus Craven & S.R.Jones
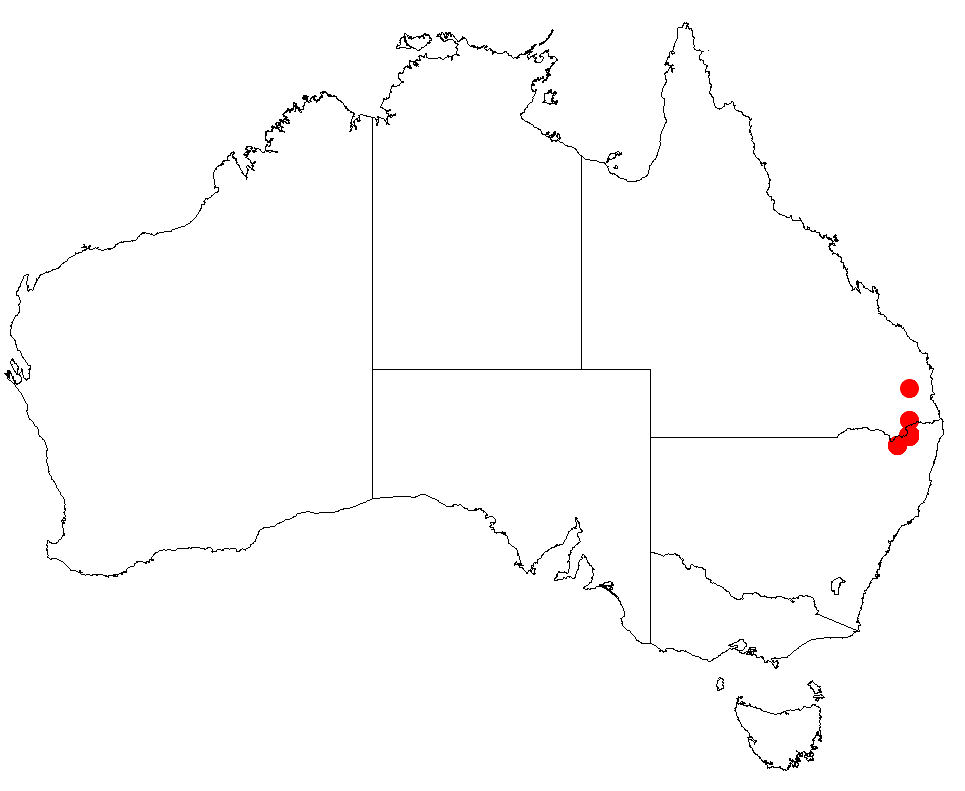
- Occurrence data from AVH

= Homoranthus lunatus =

Crescent-leaved homoranthus

Species of flowering plant

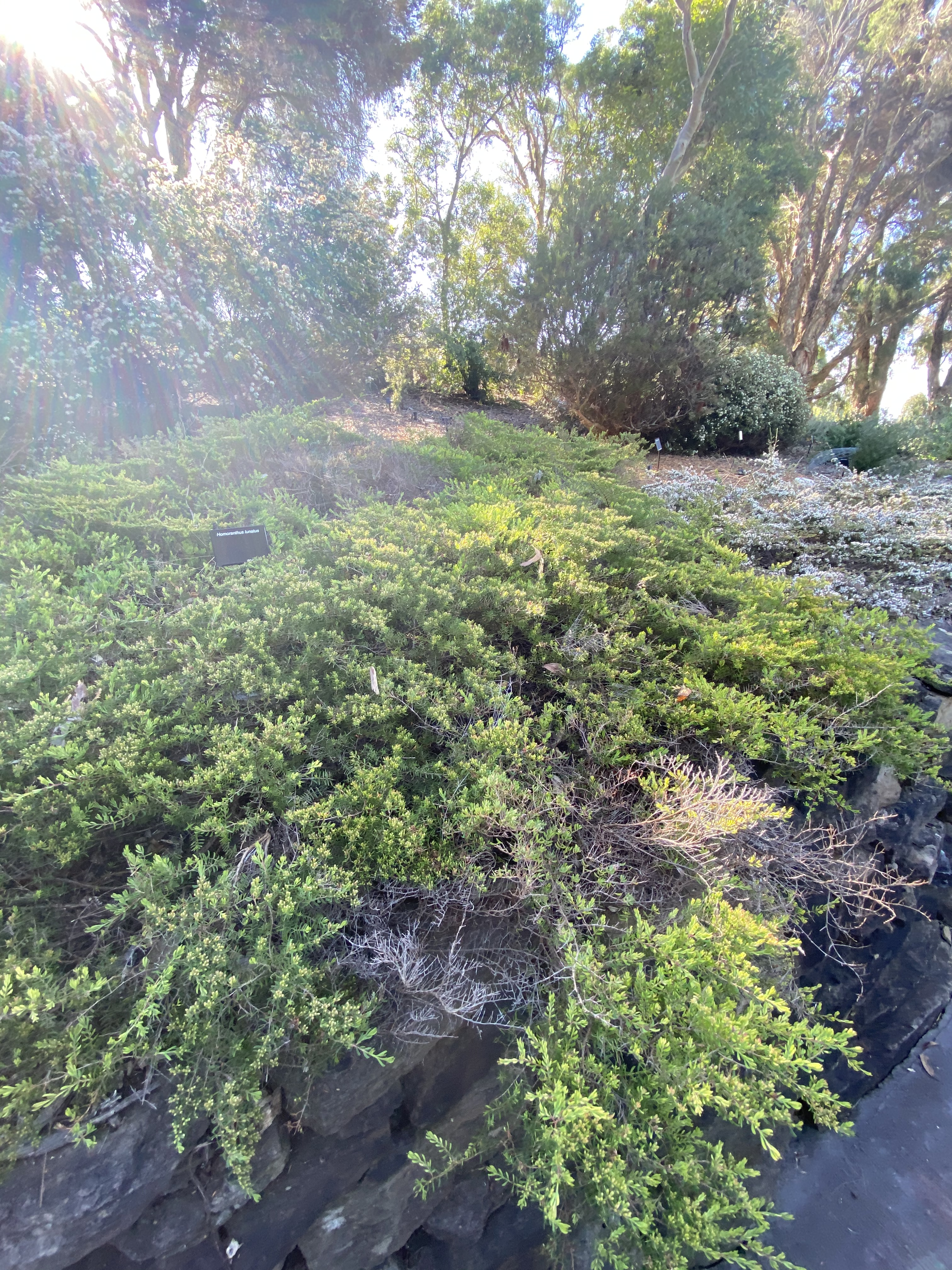
Habit

Homoranthus lunatus, commonly known as crescent-leaved homoranthus, is a flowering plant in the family Myrtaceae and is endemic to a small area in northern New South Wales. It is a spreading shrub with curved leaves and small groups of up to six yellow flowers in leaf axils.

== Description ==
Homoranthus lunatus is small, spreading shrub to about 40 cm (16 in) high. The leaves are borne in opposite pairs at right angles to one another, flattened and crescent-shaped, 4–10 mm (0.16–0.39 in) long, 1–2 mm (0.039–0.079 in) wide and pointed at the apex. The single yellow flowers are about 5 mm (0.20 in) long and arranged one to six flowers on each branch. Flowering occurs from July to November and fruits August to December.

== Taxonomy and naming ==
Homoranthus lunatus was first formally described in 1991 by Lyndley Craven and S.R.Jones and the description was published in Australian Systematic Botany. The specific epithet (lunatus) is a Latin word meaning "shaped like a crescent moon".

== Distribution and habitat ==
Only found in a single population in Torrington district and locations in Boonoo Boonoo and Basket Swamp National Parks north east of Tenterfield New South Wales. Grows in heath on shallow sandy soils on and around granite outcrops.

== Conservation status ==
Considered vulnerable by Briggs and Leigh (1996). ROTAP code 2VCt. The plant should be considered rare.
