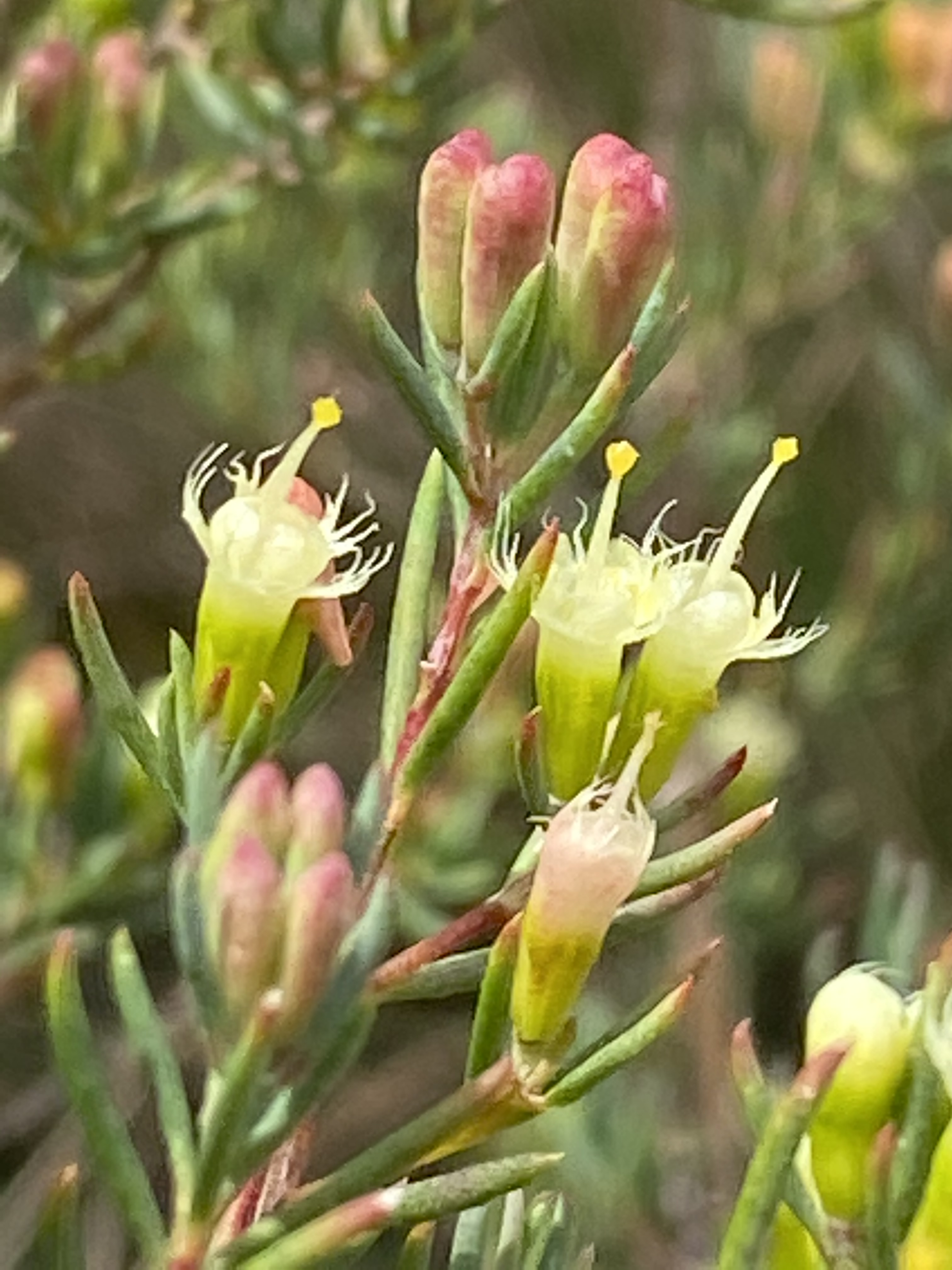

Scientific classification
- Kingdom: Plantae
- Clade: Tracheophytes
- Clade: Angiosperms
- Clade: Eudicots
- Clade: Rosids
- Order: Myrtales
- Family: Myrtaceae
- Genus: Homoranthus
- Species: H. biflorus

Binomial name
- Homoranthus biflorus Craven & S.R.Jones
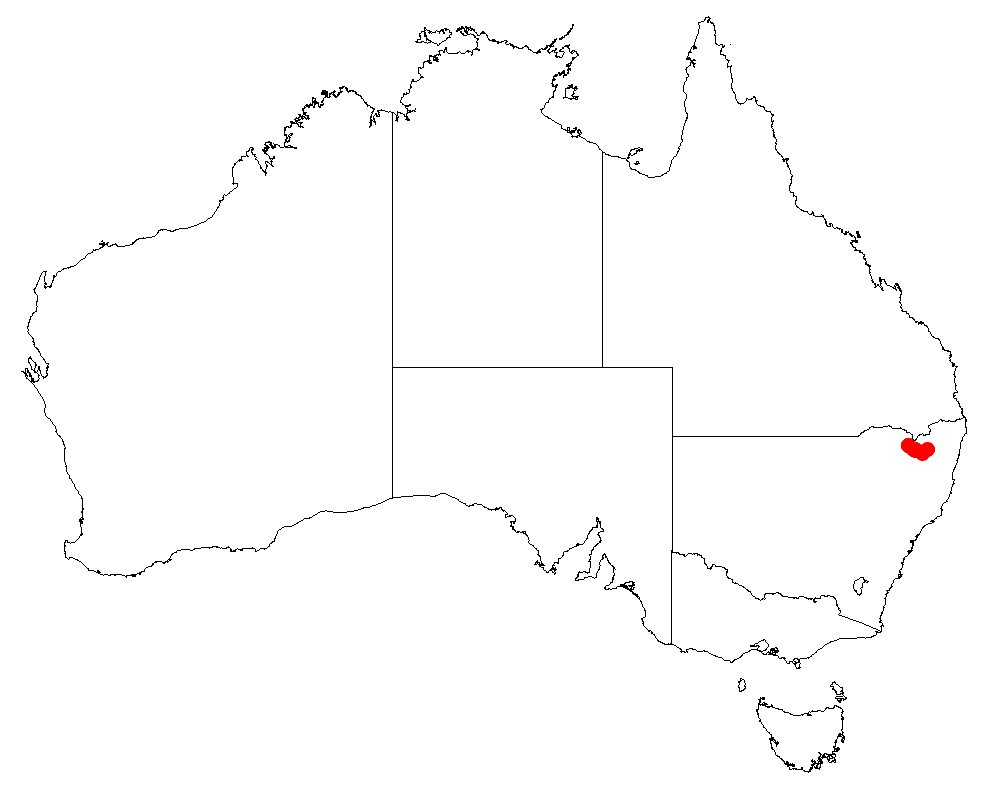
- Occurrence data from AVH

= Homoranthus biflorus =

Species of flowering plant

Homoranthus biflorus is a flowering plant in the family Myrtaceae and is endemic to a small area in northern New South Wales. It is an erect shrub with cylinder-shaped leaves and small groups of usually yellow flowers.

== Description ==
Homoranthus biflorus is an erect shrub which grows to a height of 1.2 metres (4 ft). It has glabrous, linear, more or less cylinder-shaped leaves with a pointed tip. The leaf blade is linear in side view, less than 1 millimetre (0.04 in) thick. Flowers appear singly or in pairs and are red, yellow, or greenish-yellow with petals about 2 millimetres (0.08 in) long surrounding the base of a style which is 6–10 millimetres (0.2–0.4 in) long. Flowers and fruits sporadically throughout the year, although primarily between October and January.

== Taxonomy and naming ==
Homoranthus biflorus was first formally described in 1991 by Lyndley Craven and Sandra Raelene Jones and the description was published in Australian Systematic Botany. The specific epithet (biflorus) means "two flowered".

== Distribution and habitat ==
This homoranthus grows in heath and woodland on volcanic ridges on the Northern Tablelands of New South Wales.

== Conservation status ==
Locally common though restricted in distribution, Barbara Briggs and John Leigh (1996) gave this species a conservation code of 2RCat;. However 2RC is more appropriate given that some plants near Pindarri Dam are unreserved.
