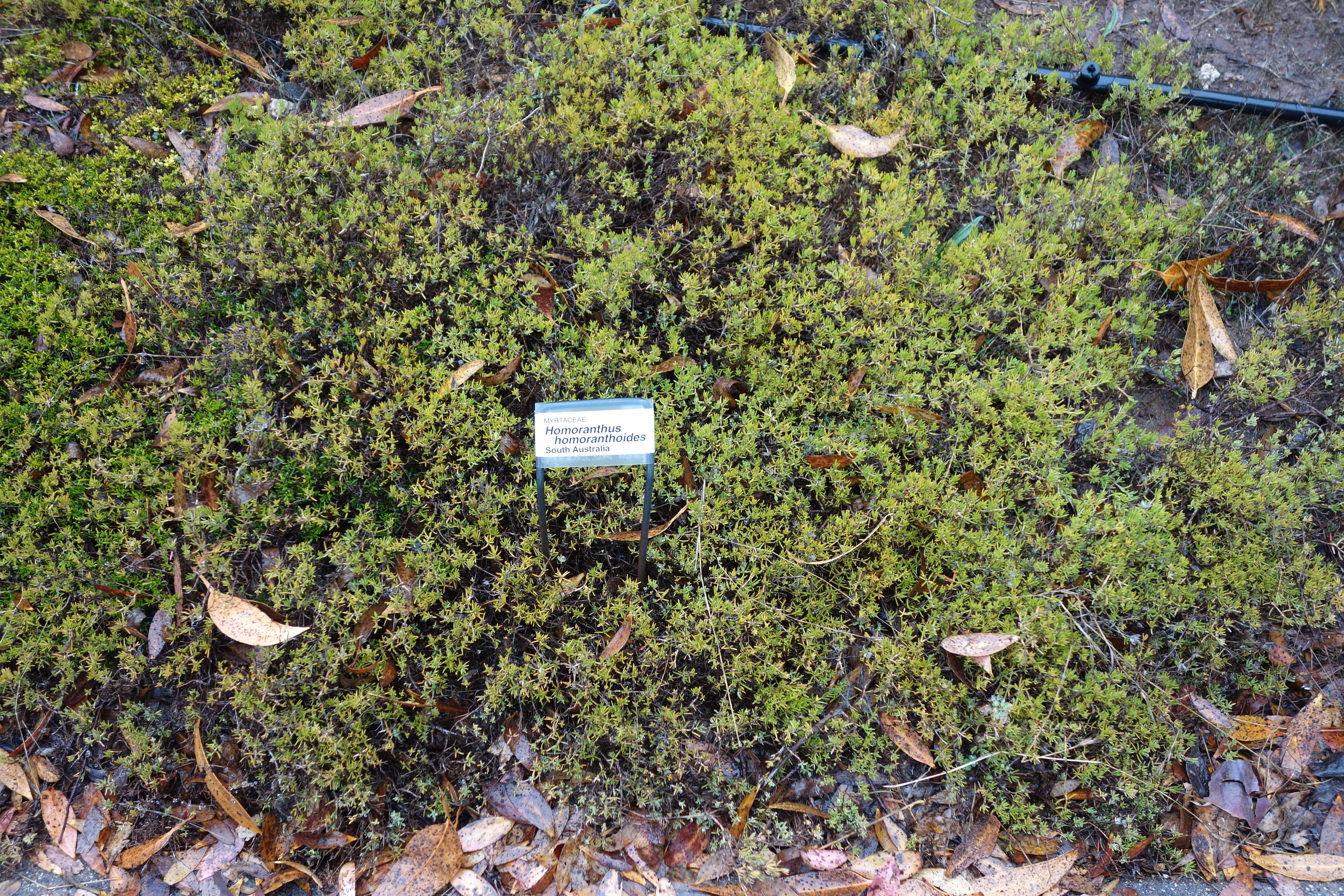
- Homoranthus homoranthoides in the Arboretum at the University of California, Santa Cruz

Scientific classification
- Kingdom: Plantae
- Clade: Tracheophytes
- Clade: Angiosperms
- Clade: Eudicots
- Clade: Rosids
- Order: Myrtales
- Family: Myrtaceae
- Genus: Homoranthus
- Species: H. homoranthoides

Binomial name
- Homoranthus homoranthoides (F.Muell.) Craven & S.R.Jones
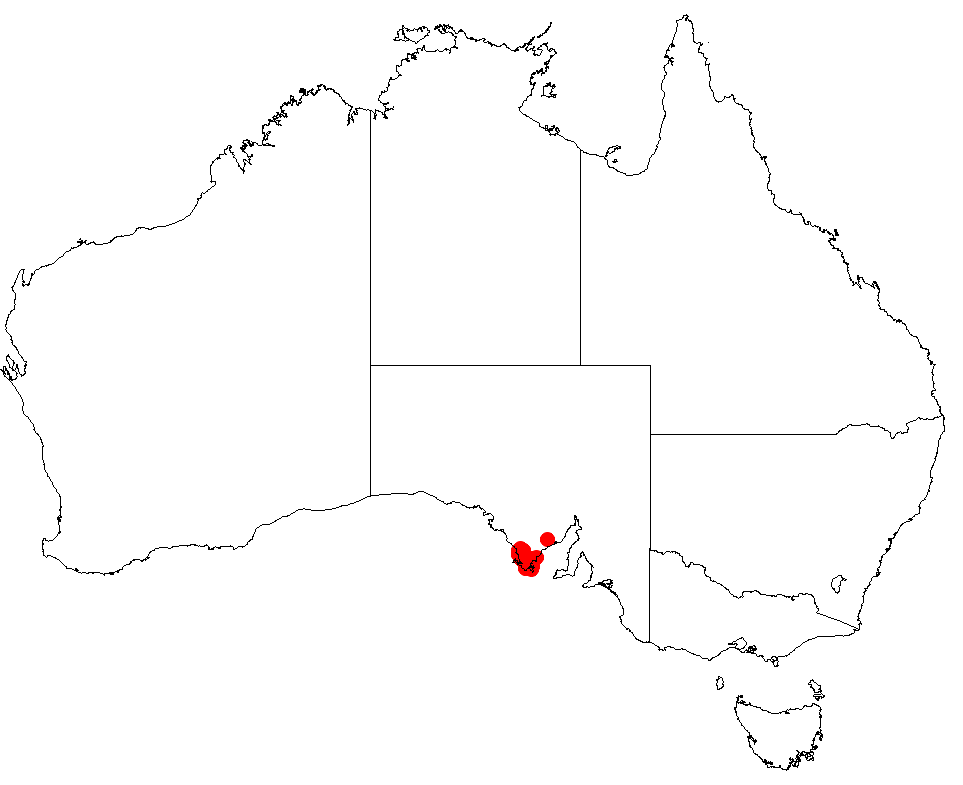
- Occurrence data from AVH

Synonyms
- Schuermannia homoranthoides F.Muell.; Genetyllis schuermannii F.Muell. nom. superfl.; Chamelaucium schuermannii F.Muell. nom. superfl.; Darwinia schuermannii Benth. nom. superfl.; Darwinia homoranthoides (F.Muell.) J.M.Black

= Homoranthus homoranthoides =

Species of plant

Homoranthus homoranthoides is a plant in the myrtle family Myrtaceae and is endemic to South Australia.

== Description ==
Homoranthus homoranthoides is a distinctive species recognised by its low growing prostrate habit. A shrub with greyish green linear leaves, small pendulous cream coloured flowers which turn red as they age.

== Taxonomy and naming ==
This species was first formally described in 1853 by Ferdinand von Mueller who gave it the name Schuermannia homoranthoides and published the description in the journal Linnaea. In 1991, Lyndley Craven and S.R.Jones changed the name to Homoranthus homoranthoides. The specific epithet (homoranthoides) refers to the similarity of this species (when named as Schuermannia homoranthoides) to those in the genus Homoranthus. The ending -oides is a Latin suffix meaning "like", "resembling" or "having the form of".

== Distribution and habitat ==
Homoranthus homoranthoides grows in heath and woodland on the southern part of the Eyre Peninsula. Grows on a variety of substrates in mallee heath and woodland.

== Conservation status ==
Moderately restricted distribution although well reserved and often locally common.
