= Homoranthus decumbens =

Conservation status
- Endangered (EPBC Act)

Scientific classification
- Kingdom: Plantae
- Clade: Tracheophytes
- Clade: Angiosperms
- Clade: Eudicots
- Clade: Rosids
- Order: Myrtales
- Family: Myrtaceae
- Genus: Homoranthus
- Species: H. decumbens

Binomial name
- Homoranthus decumbens Byrnes Craven & S.R.Jones
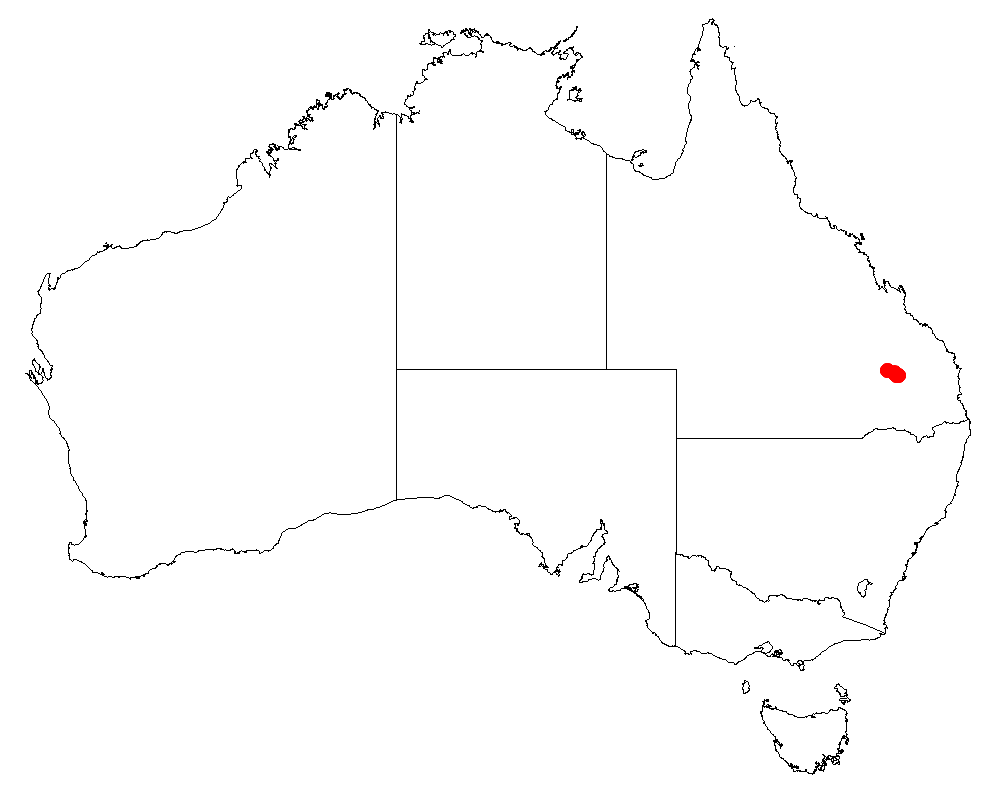
- Occurrence data from AVH

Synonyms
- Darwinia decumbens Byrnes

Species of flowering plant

Homoranthus decumbens is a plant in the myrtle family Myrtaceae and is endemic to a small area in Queensland. It is a low, spreading shrub with cylindrical leaves arranged in alternating opposite pairs. The flowers are yellowish green and arranged singly in upper leaf axils.

== Description ==
Flowers September to December and fruits October to December.

== Taxonomy and naming ==
This species was first formally described in 1984 by Norman Byrnes who gave it the name of Darwinia decumbens and published the description in Austrobaileya. In 1991, Lyndley Craven and S.R.Jones changed the name to Homoranthus decumbens. The specific epithet (decumbens) is a Latin word meaning "lying down" or "reclining".

== Distribution and habitat ==
Found in a small area north of Chinchilla Queensland. Grows on deep sandy soils in heath and shrubby woodland on flat terrain.

== Conservation ==
Homoranthus decumbens is listed as "endangered" under the Australian Government EPBC Act of 1999. A very rare species with a highly restricted distribution. A ROTAP code of 2VC is appropriate, Briggs and Leigh (1996). IUCN (2010) considered vulnerable.
