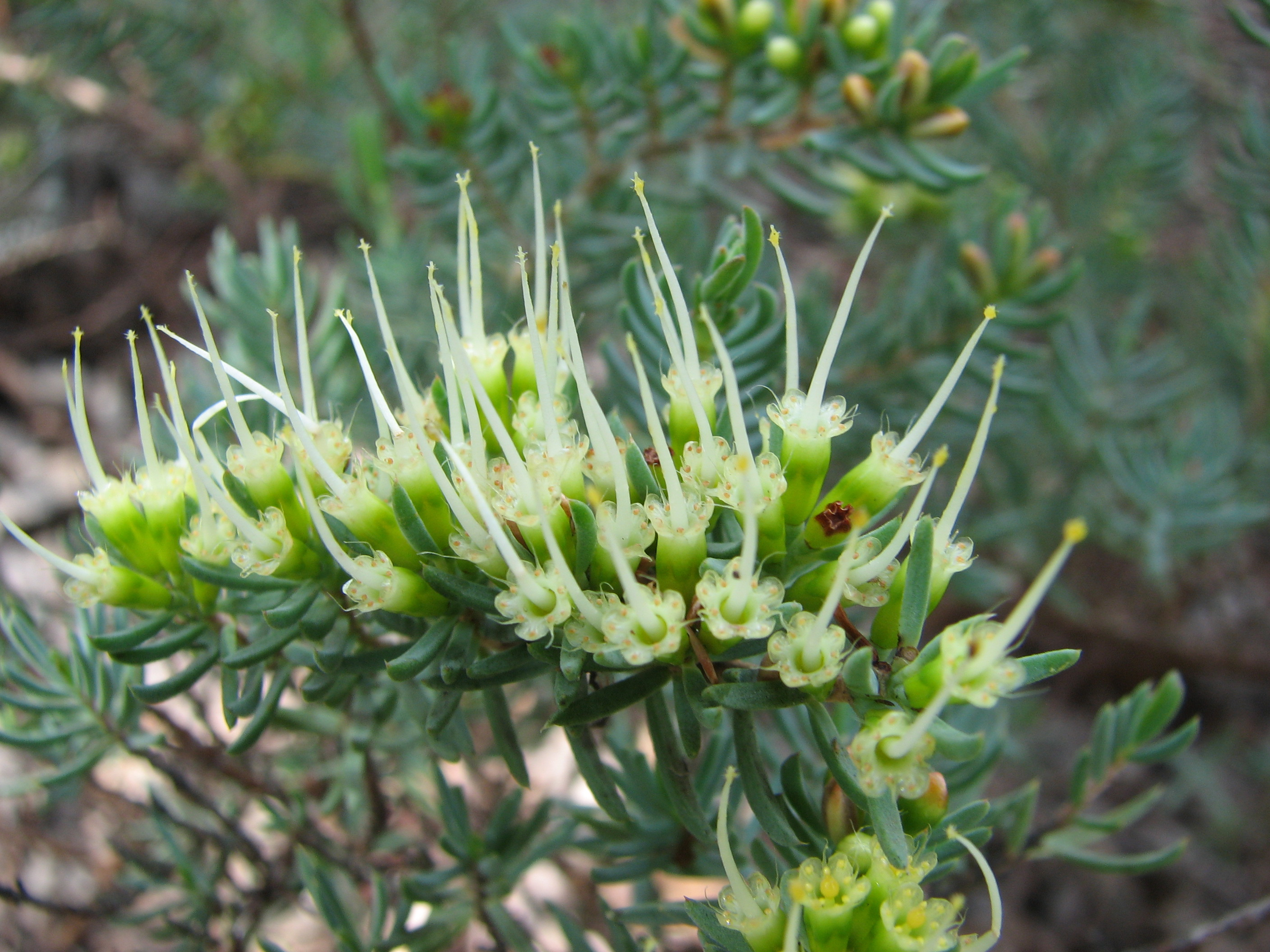
- Homoranthus papillatus in Maranoa Gardens

Scientific classification
- Kingdom: Plantae
- Clade: Tracheophytes
- Clade: Angiosperms
- Clade: Eudicots
- Clade: Rosids
- Order: Myrtales
- Family: Myrtaceae
- Genus: Homoranthus
- Species: H. papillatus

Binomial name
- Homoranthus papillatus Byrnes
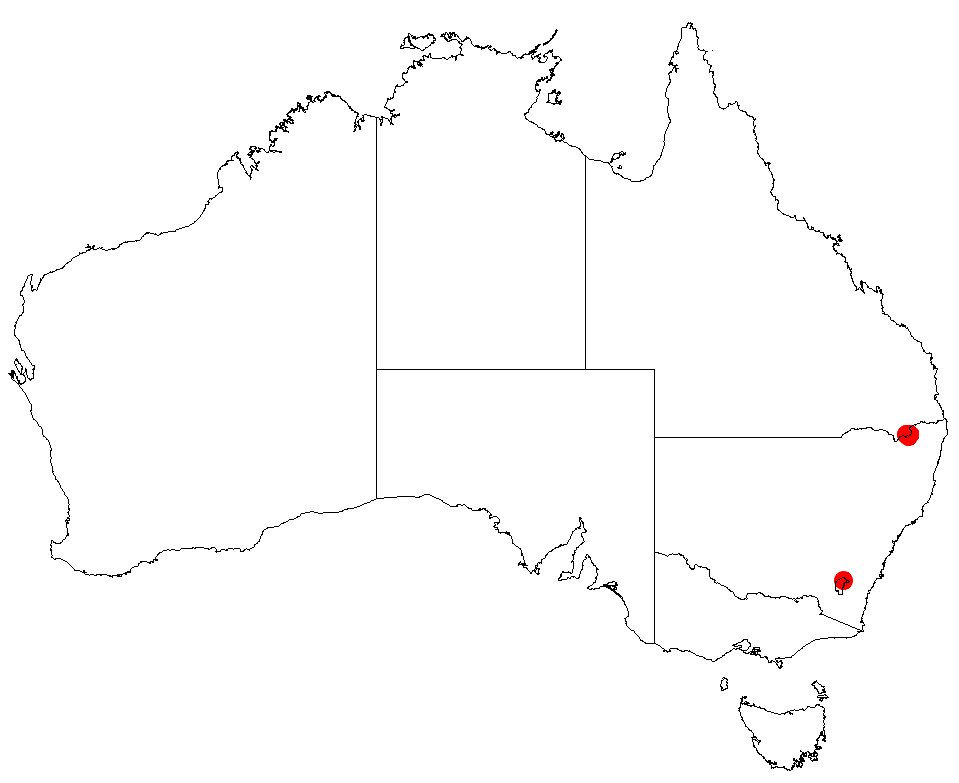
- Occurrence data from AVH

= Homoranthus papillatus =

Mouse bush

Species of flowering plant

Homoranthus papillatus, commonly known as mouse bush, is a flowering plant in the family Myrtaceae and is endemic to a small area in southern Queensland. It is a compact shrub with curved, linear leaves and pale yellow flowers arranged in upper leaf axils.

== Description ==
Homoranthus papiillatus is small, prostrate, spreading shrub to 1 m (3 ft 3 in) high. The leaves are arranged opposite on a short petiole, linear, curved, about 10 mm (0.39 in) long with dense warty protuberances on the surface. The flowers are borne singly in upper leaf axils, light lemon-yellow, calyx tube 4 mm (0.16 in) long, 1 mm (0.039 in) in diameter, smooth, ribbed, five orbicular petals about 1 mm (0.039 in) in diameter, and a protruding style 6–9 mm (0.24–0.35 in) long, pedicel 1–2 mm (0.039–0.079 in) long. The bracts are 5 mm (0.20 in) long, dry and fall off when the flower opens. Flowering occurs from September to November and the dry fruit forms September to December.

== Taxonomy and naming ==
Homoranthus papillatus was first formally described in 1981 by Norman Byrnes from a specimen collected in Girraween National Park in 1976 and the description was published in Austrobaileya. The specific epithet (papillatus) is a Latin word meaning "budlike". The common name "mouse bush" is due to the strong odour the plant emits, that of the smell of mice.

== Distribution and habitat ==
Mouse bush is endemic to Mount Norman in Girraween National Park, Queensland where it grows in heath on skeletal sandy soils among crevices of granite outcrops.

== Conservation status ==
This homoranthus is a rare species with a highly restricted distribution and low population numbers. It has been given ROTAP conservation code 2VC-t. IUCN (2010) considered "vulnerable".
