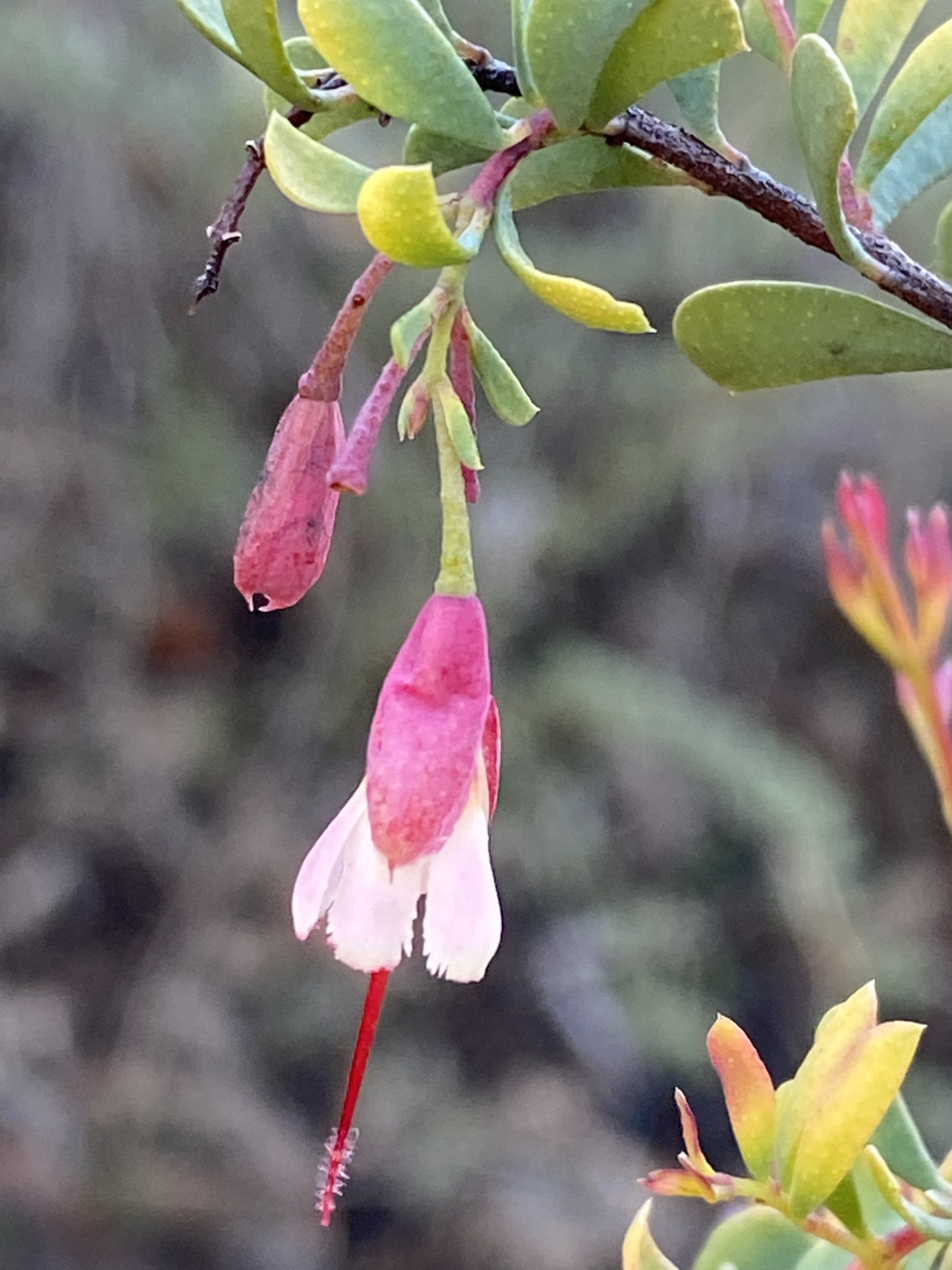
- Homoranthus thomasii in the Australian National Botanic Gardens

Scientific classification
- Kingdom: Plantae
- Clade: Tracheophytes
- Clade: Angiosperms
- Clade: Eudicots
- Clade: Rosids
- Order: Myrtales
- Family: Myrtaceae
- Genus: Homoranthus
- Species: H. thomasii

Binomial name
- Homoranthus thomasii (F.Muell.) Craven & S.R.Jones
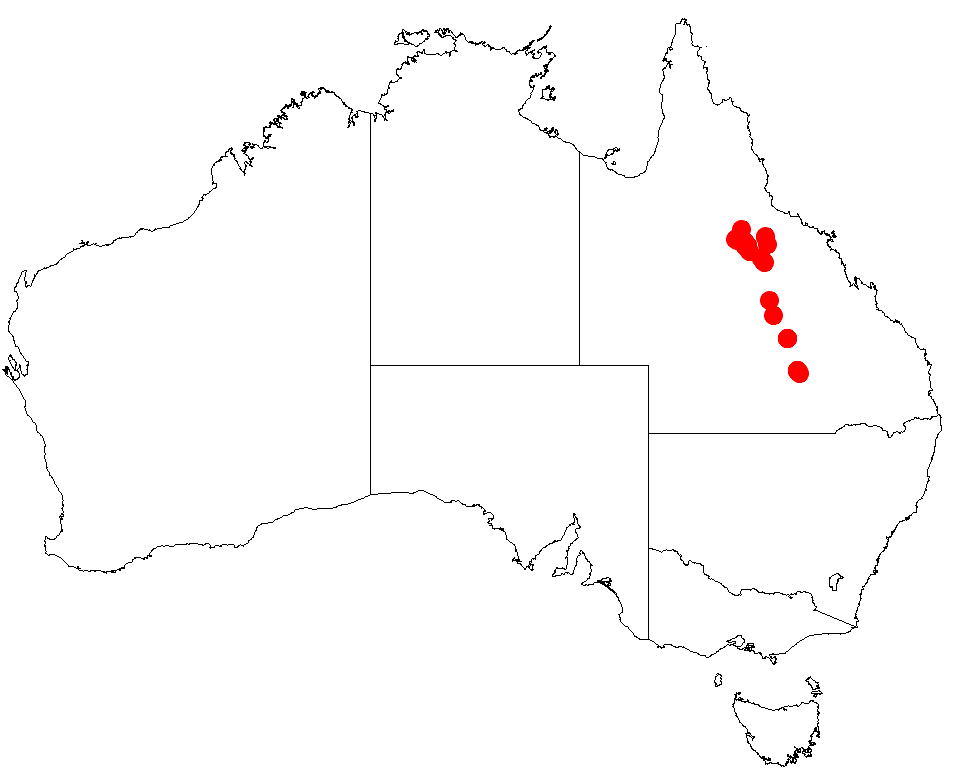
- Occurrence data from AVH

Synonyms
- Chamelaucium thomasii F.Muell.; Darwinia thomasii (F.Muell.) Benth.

= Homoranthus thomasii =

Species of flowering plant

Homoranthus thomasii is a species of flowering plant in the family Myrtaceae and is endemic to Queensland. It is a small shrub with spoon-shaped, greyish green leaves and small, pendulous, pink flowers in the upper leaf axils.

== Description ==
Homoranthus thomasii is a small, slender shrub 1.5–2 m (4 ft 11 in – 6 ft 7 in) high, 0.6–1 m (2 ft 0 in – 3 ft 3 in) wide with upright branches. The greyish-green leaves are arranged opposite, thick, spoon-shaped, fragrant, 0.6–1.5 cm (0.24–0.59 in) long and ending in a recurved point at the apex. The pendulous white-pink flowers 1 cm (0.39 in) are borne in clusters in the upper leaf axils on a pedicel about 6 mm (0.24 in) long, sepals 3–4 mm (0.1–0.2 in) long, white or pink, large pink, petal-like bracts 6 mm (0.24 in) long ending in a point. The pink to red style 15–20 mm (0.6–0.8 in) long and is twice the length of the calyx tube. This species is distinguished from most other species by its tall growth habit, axehead-shaped leaves and pendulous flowers. Flowers and fruits usually from April to August but may flower sporadically throughout the year.

== Taxonomy and naming ==
This species was first formally described in 1864 by Ferdinand von Mueller who gave it the name Chamelaucium thomasii and published the description in the journal Fragmenta phytographiae Australiae. In 1991, Lyndley Craven and S.R.Jones changed the name to Homoranthus thomasii. The specific epithet (thomasii) honours the Melbourne doctor David John Thomas (1813–1871).

== Distribution and habitat ==
Homoranthus thomasii grows in heath and woodland from Pentland to Mitchell. Grows on shallow, sandy soils derived from sandstone, mostly in woodland or heath.

== Conservation ==
Although widely distributed, H. thomasii is of sporadic occurrence and was considered rare by Briggs and Leigh (1996). Given several recent discoveries of species in conservation areas. Now considered a ROTAP conservation 3RCa.
