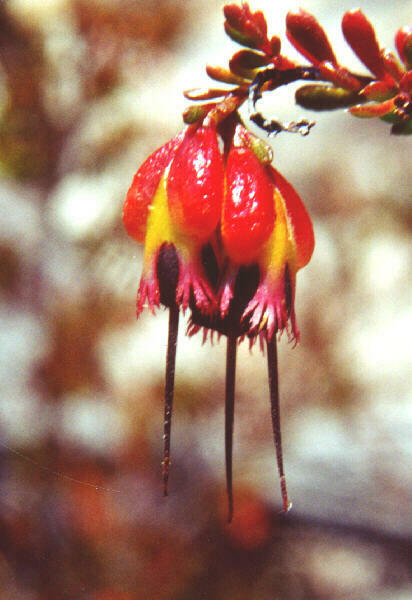
- (September 2000, Carnarvon National Park, QLD)

Scientific classification
- Kingdom: Plantae
- Clade: Tracheophytes
- Clade: Angiosperms
- Clade: Eudicots
- Clade: Rosids
- Order: Myrtales
- Family: Myrtaceae
- Genus: Homoranthus
- Species: H. coracinus

Binomial name
- Homoranthus coracinus A.R.Bean
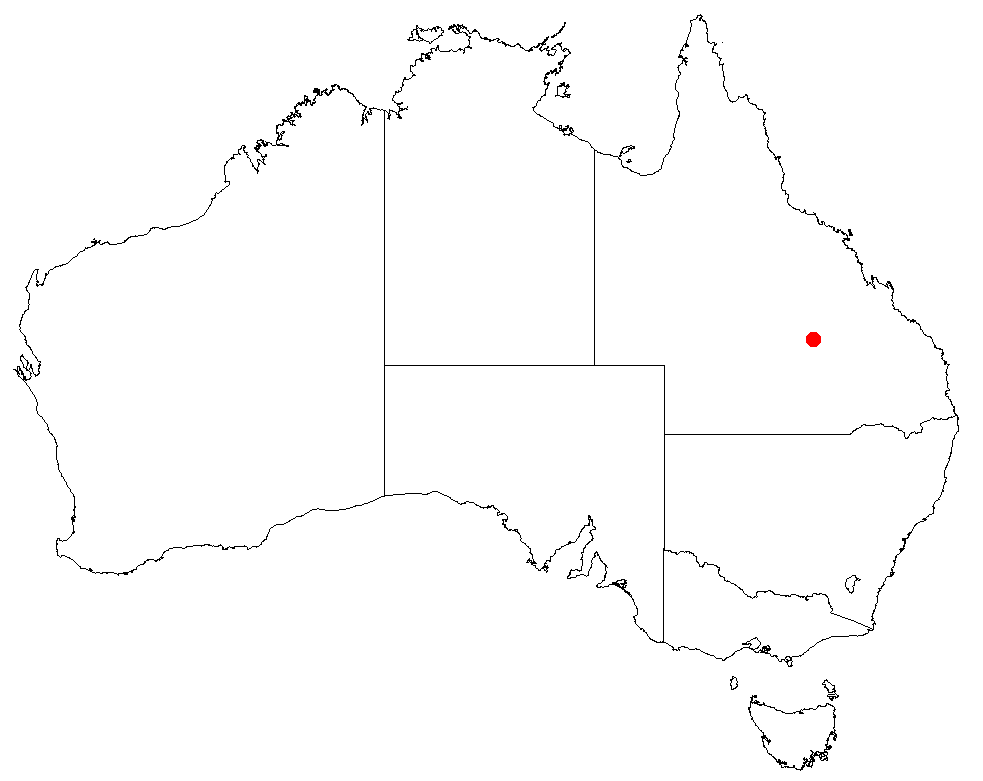
- Occurrence data from AVH

= Homoranthus coracinus =

Species of flowering plant

Homoranthus coracinus is a flowering plant in the family Myrtaceae and is endemic to a small area in Queensland. It is a low, spreading shrub with pointed, narrow, egg-shaped leaves and groups of up to six flowers with black petals. It is only known from a single population in the Ka Ka Mundi part of the Carnarvon National Park.

== Description ==
Homoranthus coracinus is a prostrate to low spreading shrub to 0.3 m (1 ft 0 in) high and 1.2 m (3 ft 11 in) wide with grey, stringy bark. The leaves are green or grey-green, pointed, narrowly egg-shaped 3.0–5.5 mm (0.12–0.22 in) long, about 0.4 mm (0.016 in) wide and 1.0–1.6 mm (0.039–0.063 in) thick, covered faintly with oil glands, petiole about 0.5 mm (0.020 in) long. The inflorescences are borne at the end of branches in pendulous clusters of 3-6 flowers, bracts 6–7 mm (0.24–0.28 in) long, 2.4–2.7 mm (0.094–0.106 in) wide, glandular, apex rounded and the peduncle thick and 2–3 mm (0.079–0.118 in) long. The floral tube is cylindrical, 5.3–6 mm (0.21–0.24 in) long, 2.8–3.3 mm (0.11–0.13 in) in diameter, yellow, 4 faint ribs at the base, smooth and pink-red toward the tip. The 5 sepals are upright, white, 3.2–4.3 mm (0.13–0.17 in) long, 1.2–1.5 mm (0.047–0.059 in) wide and irregularly divided. The black petals are broadly egg-shaped, 2.7–3 mm (0.11–0.12 in) long, 2.2–2.7 mm (0.087–0.106 in) wide with smooth margins. Flowering occurs in April, May and September.

== Taxonomy and naming ==
Homoranthus coracinus was first formally described in 2000 by Anthony Bean from a specimen collected in the Ka Ka Mundi National Park (now part of Carnarvon National Park) and the description was published in Austrobaileya. The specific epithet (coracinus) is a Latin word meaning "ravenlike" or "black as a crow", referring to the colour of the petals.

== Distribution and habitat ==
This homoranthus grows in heath and sandstone outcrops in shallow soils and is endemic to the Mount Mooloolong area in Carnarvon National Park in central Queensland. heath on

== Conservation status ==
The species is known from a single population. Bean (2000) species considered endangered. ROTAP code of 2ECit using Briggs and Leigh (1996) IUCN (2010) considered 'Endangered'.
