= Westringia longepedunculata =

Conservation status
- Least Concern (NCA)

Scientific classification
- Kingdom: Plantae
- Clade: Tracheophytes
- Clade: Angiosperms
- Clade: Eudicots
- Clade: Asterids
- Order: Lamiales
- Family: Lamiaceae
- Genus: Westringia
- Species: W. longepedunculata

Binomial name
- Westringia longepedunculata B.Boivin, 1949

Species of flowering plant

Westringia longepedunculata is a species of plant in the mint family that is endemic to Australia. It is found in south-eastern Queensland, and is sometimes considered to be a synonym of Westringia cheelii.
