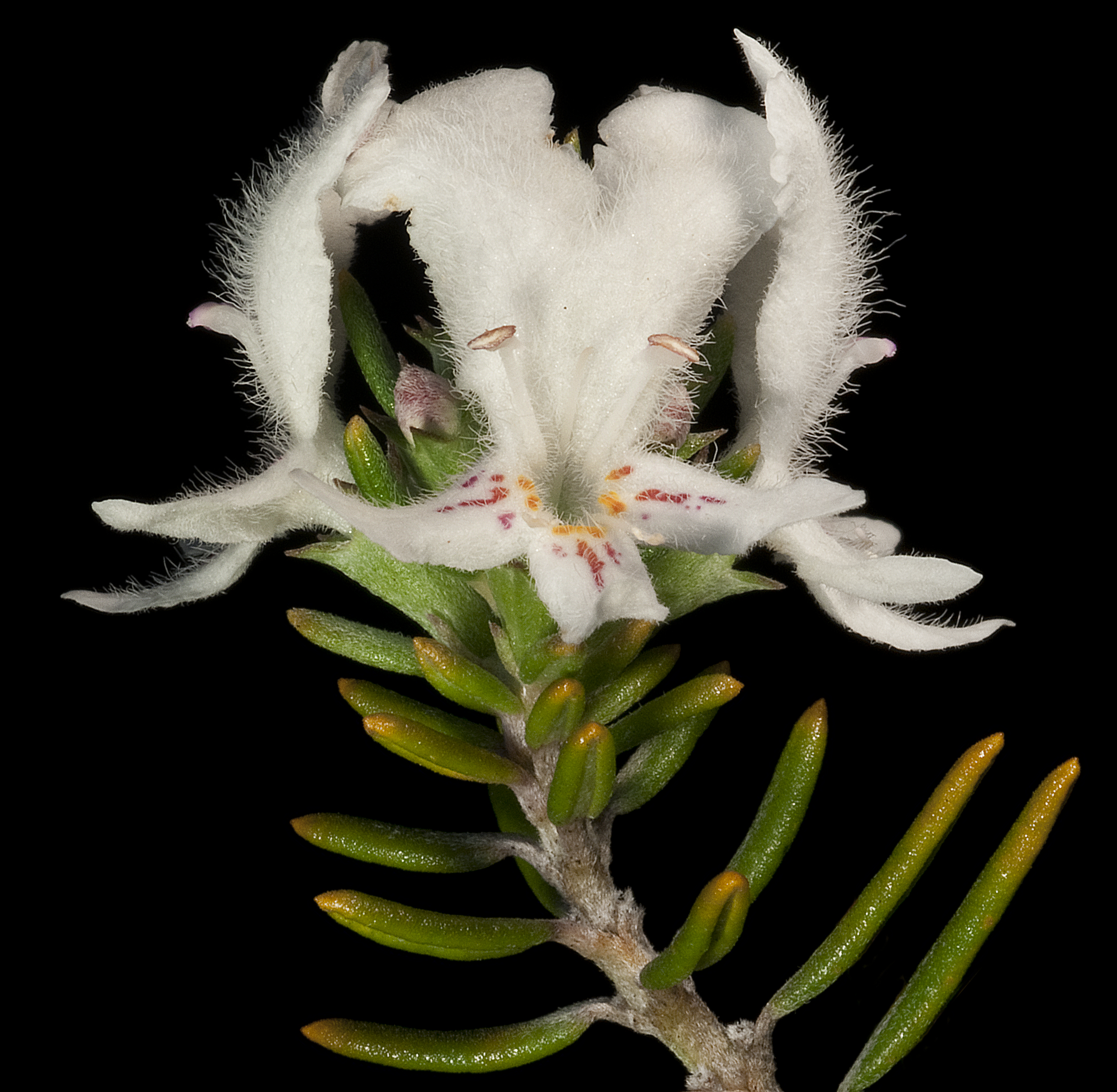

Scientific classification
- Kingdom: Plantae
- Clade: Tracheophytes
- Clade: Angiosperms
- Clade: Eudicots
- Clade: Asterids
- Order: Lamiales
- Family: Lamiaceae
- Genus: Westringia
- Species: W. dampieri

Binomial name
- Westringia dampieri R.Br.
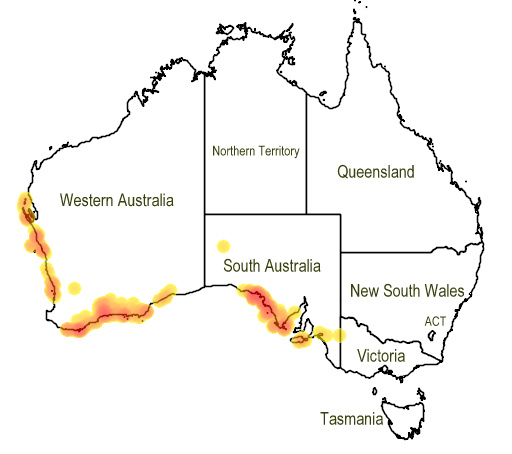

= Westringia dampieri =

Shore westringia

Species of shrub

Westringia dampieri, commonly known as shore westringia, is a flowering plant in the family Lamiaceae, it grows in South Australia and Western Australia. It is a small, dense shrub with white, mauve, cream or purple flowers.

== Description ==
Westringia dampieri is a small shrub with more or less circular stems in cross section. The leaves are simple, arranged in whorls, 8–27 mm (0.31–1.06 in) long and 1.5–2.5 mm (0.059–0.098 in) wide with simple surface hairs. The corolla may be cream, white, purple or mauve, markings in the throat, 12–15 mm (0.47–0.59 in) long, simple hairs and on a pedicel 0.5–1.5 mm (0.020–0.059 in) long. The calyx is moderately thick, has five lobes 1.2–2.2 mm (0.047–0.087 in) long and simple hairs. Flowering occurs in late summer, winter and early to mid spring.

== Taxonomy naming ==
Westringia dampieri was first formally described in 1810 by Scottish botanist Robert Brown based on specimens collected at King George Sound and the description was published in Prodromus Florae Novae Hollandiae et Insulae Van Diemen. The name has been misapplied to Westringia eremicola and Westringia senifolia. The specific epithet (dampieri) was named in honour of William Dampier.

== Distribution and habitat ==
Shore westringia grows mostly on sandy soils in coastal locations or nearby on the west coast and south coast of Western Australia.
