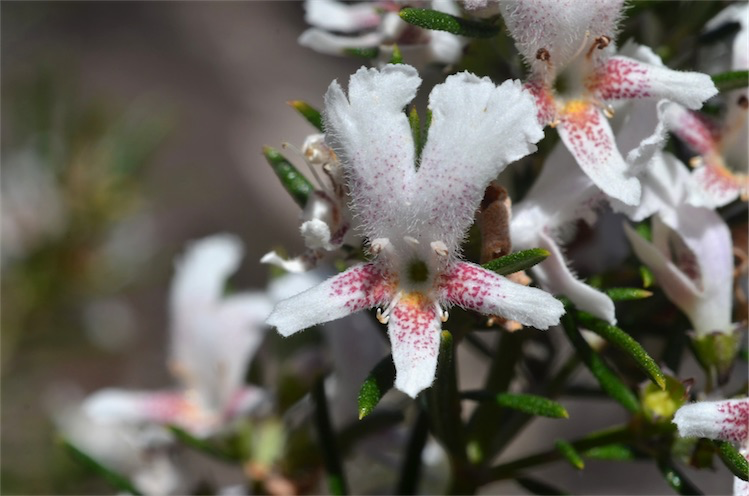

Conservation status
- Rare (TSPA)

Scientific classification
- Kingdom: Plantae
- Clade: Tracheophytes
- Clade: Angiosperms
- Clade: Eudicots
- Clade: Asterids
- Order: Lamiales
- Family: Lamiaceae
- Genus: Westringia
- Species: W. angustifolia

Binomial name
- Westringia angustifolia R.Br.
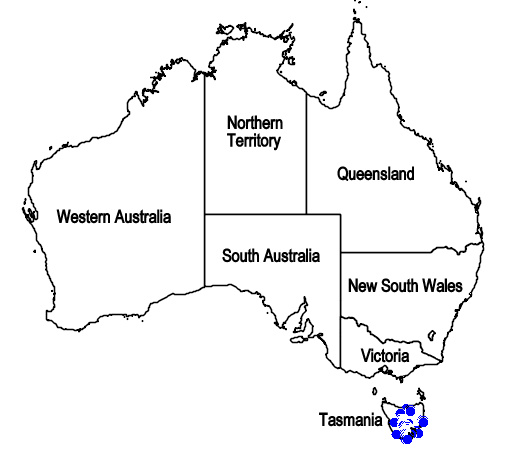
- Known range of Westringia angustifolia (in blue)

Synonyms
- Westringia quaterna B.Boivin

= Westringia angustifolia =

Species of flowering plant

Westringia angustifolia, commonly known as scabrous westringia, is a flowering plant in the family Lamiaceae and is endemic to Tasmania. It is a small, upright shrub with mauve or white flowers.

== Description ==
Westringia angustifolia is a small shrub, 1–3 m (3 ft 3 in – 9 ft 10 in) high with rigid, spreading branches. The leaves are arranged mostly in whorls of three, about 1.5–3.5 mm (0.059–0.138 in) long, on upright, slender stems about 1–2 mm (0.039–0.079 in) long, slightly bent backwards and a sharp tip at the apex. The lower surface has soft, silky hairs, the upper surface sometimes covered in small, coarse hairs. The flowers are borne in leaf axils on a pedicel, they may be white to pale lilac, with yellow, crimson or purple dots on the lower petals of the throat. Flowering occurs from October to December and most likely pollinated by insects, the fruit is a nutlet with furrowed veins on the surface.

== Taxonomy and naming ==
Westringia angustifolia was first formally described in 1810 by Robert Brown and the description was published in Prodromus Florae Novae Hollandiae et Insulae Van Diemen. The specific epithet (angustifolia) means "narrow leaved".

== Distribution and habitat ==
Scabrous westringia is an uncommon species in Tasmania, it is found mainly in dry, shrubby understorey and rocky hillsides often associated with riverbanks, on dolerite soils, at altitudes of 300–900 m.
