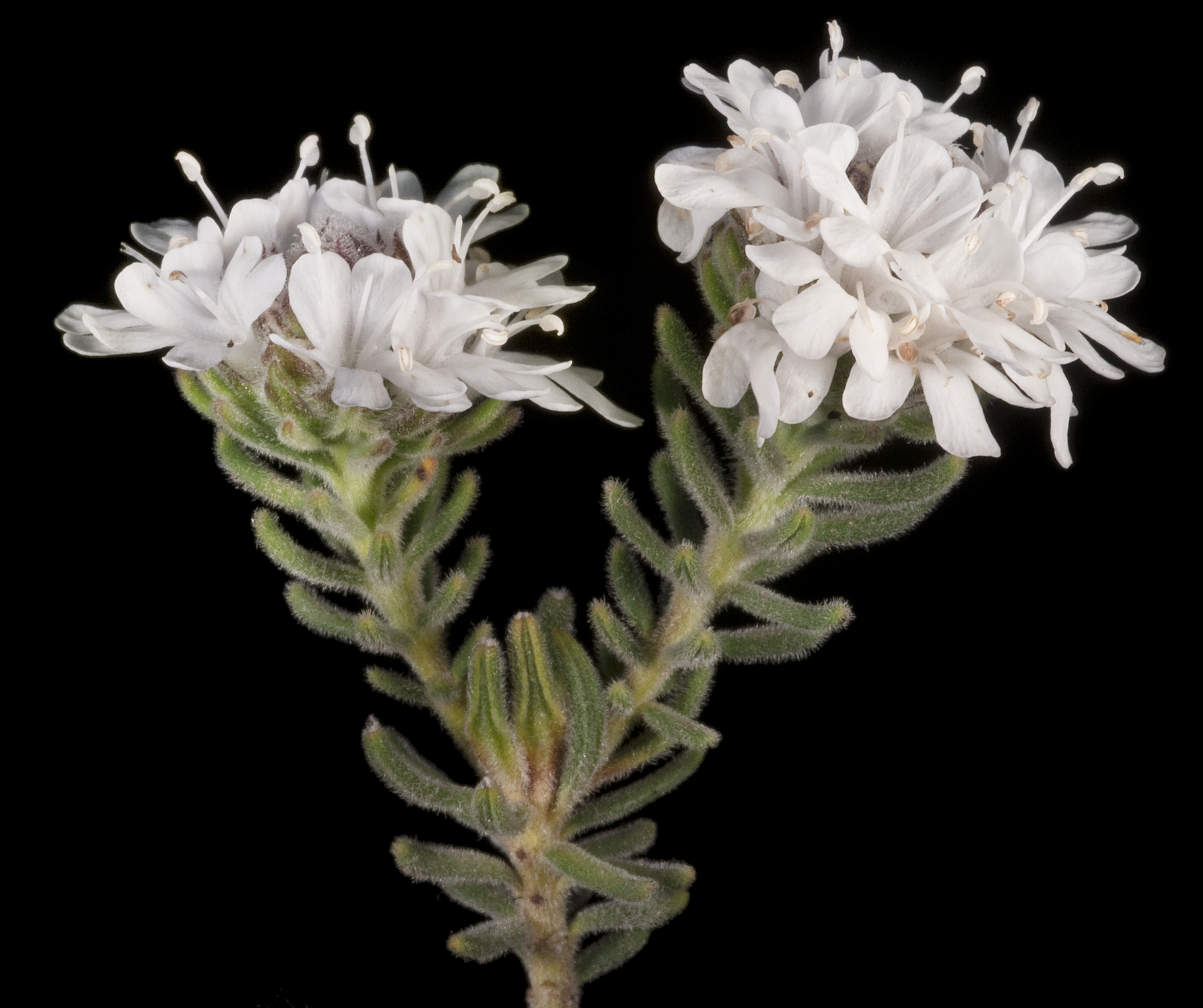
- Flowers

Scientific classification
- Kingdom: Plantae
- Clade: Tracheophytes
- Clade: Angiosperms
- Clade: Eudicots
- Clade: Asterids
- Order: Lamiales
- Family: Lamiaceae
- Genus: Westringia
- Species: W. discipulorum

Binomial name
- Westringia discipulorum S.Moore, 1921
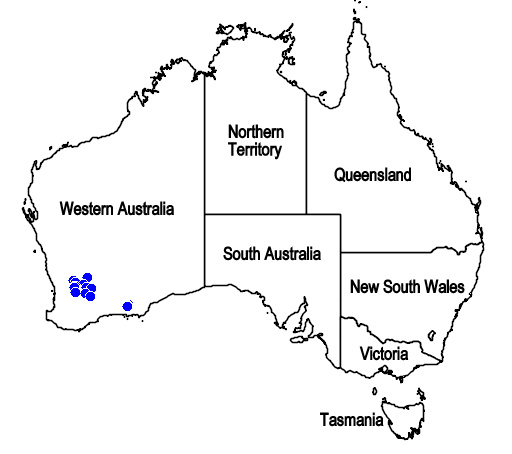
- Known distribution of Westringia discipulorum (in blue)

= Westringia discipulorum =

Species of flowering plant

Westringia discipulorum, also known as white button bush, is a species of plant in the mint family that is endemic to Western Australia.

== Description ==
The species grows as an erect shrub to 0.6–1.2 m in height. The flowers are white, appearing from September to October.

== Distribution and habitat ==
The species grows on sandy soils in the Avon Wheatbelt and Mallee IBRA bioregions of Southwest Australia.
