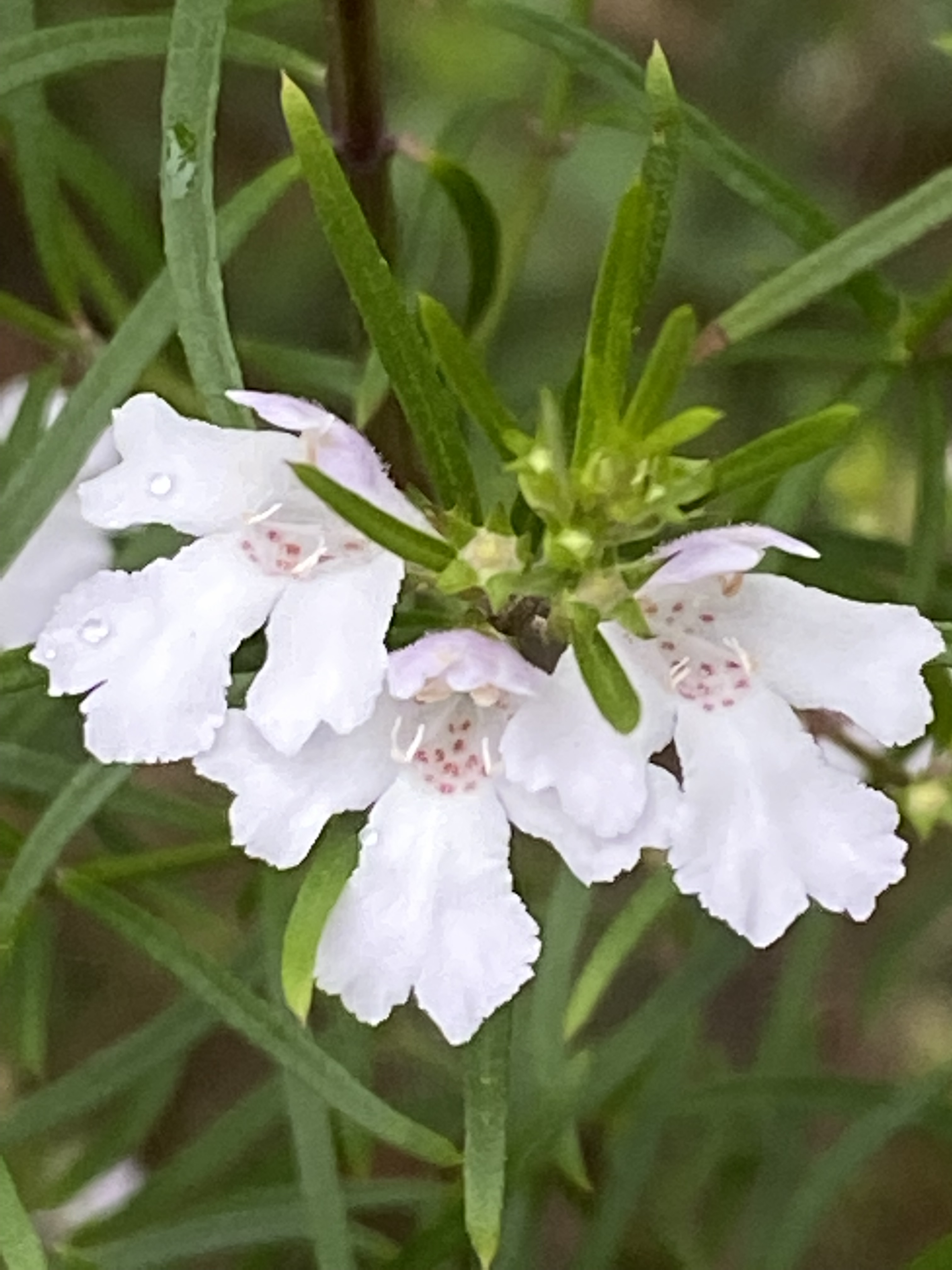

Scientific classification
- Kingdom: Plantae
- Clade: Tracheophytes
- Clade: Angiosperms
- Clade: Eudicots
- Clade: Asterids
- Order: Lamiales
- Family: Lamiaceae
- Genus: Westringia
- Species: W. longifolia

Binomial name
- Westringia longifolia R.Br.

= Westringia longifolia =

Long-leaved westringia

Species of shrub

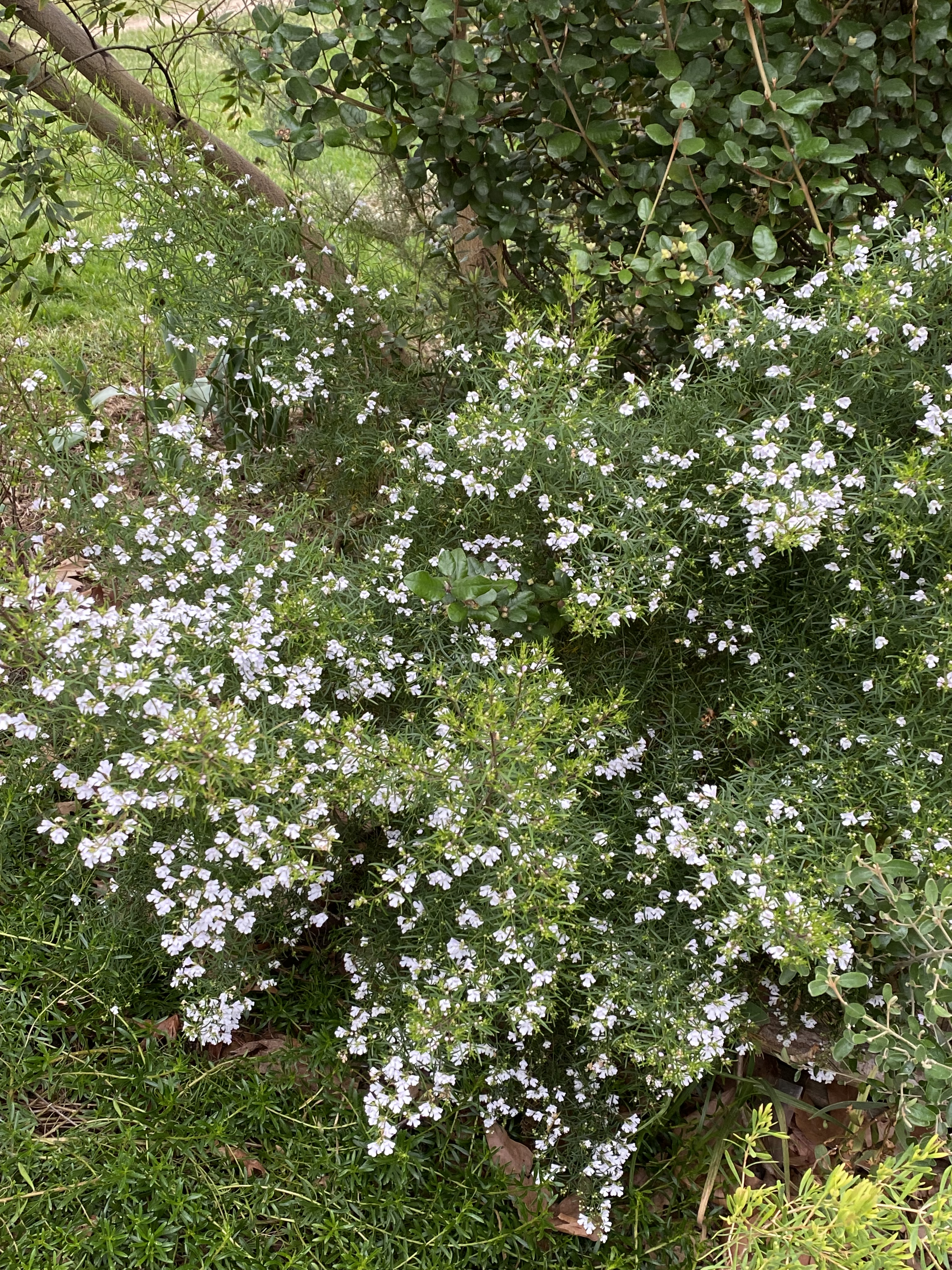
Habit

Westringia longifolia, commonly known as long-leaved westringia, is a flowering plant in the family Lamiaceae and is endemic to southeastern Australia. It is a small shrub, with linear leaves and mostly white flowers.

== Description ==
Westringia longifolia is a small shrub that grows to 1–3 m (3 ft 3 in – 9 ft 10 in) high with a similar spread. The linear shaped green leaves are arranged in whorls of three, 12–35 mm (0.47–1.38 in) long, 1–2 mm (0.039–0.079 in) wide, more or less flat, margins smooth, both surfaces with occasional hairs or smooth, and the petiole 1–1.7 mm (0.039–0.067 in) long. The flowers are borne singly in the leaf axils, corolla 8–10 mm (0.31–0.39 in) long, lobes more or less triangular shaped, 1.6–2.8 mm (0.063–0.110 in) long, 0.9–1.2 mm (0.035–0.047 in) wide, mostly white or occasionally mauve with spots purple or light brown and silky inside. The green calyx are smooth or with sparse hairs on the outer surface and bracteoles 1–2 mm (0.039–0.079 in) long. Flowering occurs mostly from July to December

== Taxonomy and naming ==
Westringia longifolia was first formally described in 1810 by Robert Brown and the description was published in Prodromus florae Novae Hollandiae. The specific epithet (longifolia) means "long leaved".

== Distribution and habitat ==
Long-leaves westringia grows in gullies, near streams on sandy or loamy soils north of Mittagong, scattered throughout Sydney and the Central Tablelands.
