= Westringia acifolia =

Scientific classification
- Kingdom: Plantae
- Clade: Tracheophytes
- Clade: Angiosperms
- Clade: Eudicots
- Clade: Asterids
- Order: Lamiales
- Family: Lamiaceae
- Genus: Westringia
- Species: W. acifolia

Binomial name
- Westringia acifolia G.R.Guerin
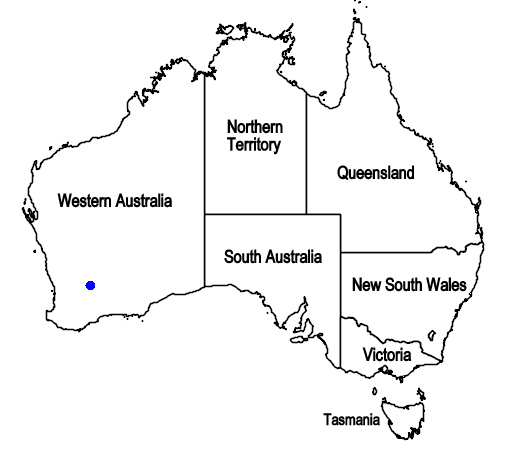
- Known distribution of Westringia acifolia (in blue)

Species of flowering plant

Westringia acifolia is a flowering plant in the family Lamiaceae and is endemic to Western Australia. It is a compact shrub with linear to needle-shaped leaves and white to cream flowers.

== Description ==
Westringia acifolia is an upright, thickly branched shrub to 0.35 m (1 ft 2 in) high, the stems in cross section are more or less circular. The leaves are arranged opposite in crowded whorls, 6.5–15 mm (0.26–0.59 in) long, 1–2.2 mm (0.039–0.087 in) wide, linear to needle-shaped, simple surface hairs, margins curved under, apex sharply pointed, petiole 0.6–1.2 mm (0.024–0.047 in) long. The flowers are white to cream, the corolla 7.5 mm (0.30 in) long with simple hairs, and the style 6 mm (0.24 in) long. The bracts 1.2 mm (0.047 in) long with occasional simple hairs. The calyx has 5 lobes, 2.5 mm (0.098 in) long and simple, scattered hairs. The petals are oblong shaped, 1.6–1.8 mm (0.063–0.071 in) long, 1.2 mm (0.047 in) wide, the edges smooth or widely toothed and the apex rounded. Flowering occurs in December.

== Taxonomy and naming ==
Westringia acifolia was first formally described in 2009 by Greg Guerin and the description was published in Australian Systematic Botany. The specific epithet (acifolia) means "sharp leaved".

== Distribution and habitat ==
This species grows in heath on brown clay and sand in the Avon Wheatbelt IBRA bioregion of south-west Australia.
