= Westringia fitzgeraldensis =

Scientific classification
- Kingdom: Plantae
- Clade: Tracheophytes
- Clade: Angiosperms
- Clade: Eudicots
- Clade: Asterids
- Order: Lamiales
- Family: Lamiaceae
- Genus: Westringia
- Species: W. fitzgeraldensis

Binomial name
- Westringia fitzgeraldensis R.W.Davis & P.Jobson, 2013
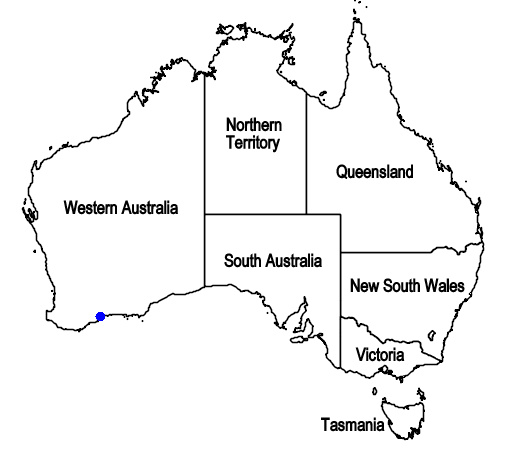
- Known range of Westringia fitzgeraldensis (in blue)

Species of flowering plant

Westringia fitzgeraldensis is a species of plant in the mint family that is endemic to Western Australia.

== Etymology ==
The specific epithet fitzgeraldensis refers to the type locality.

== Description ==
The species grows as an erect, open shrub to 1.2 m in height. The leaves are 7.5–11.1 mm long and 1.1–1.6 mm wide, occurring in crowded whorls of four. The flowers are white, appearing in September.

== Distribution and habitat ==
The species occurs in the Esperance Plains IBRA bioregion of south-western Australia. It is known only from a single population, in a valley west of Hopetoun, in the Fitzgerald River National Park. There it is found on alluvial, orange-brown, loam soils with quartzite fragments, in open mallee woodland, in association with Eucalyptus uncinata, E. redunca, E. conglobata, Melaleuca pomphostoma, M. suberosa and Siegfriedia darwinioides.
