= Westringia cremnophila =

Snowy River westringia

Conservation status
- Vulnerable (EPBC Act)

Scientific classification
- Kingdom: Plantae
- Clade: Tracheophytes
- Clade: Angiosperms
- Clade: Eudicots
- Clade: Asterids
- Order: Lamiales
- Family: Lamiaceae
- Genus: Westringia
- Species: W. cremnophila

Binomial name
- Westringia cremnophila N.A.Wakef.

Species of shrub

Westringia cremnophila, commonly known as Snowy River westringia, is a flowering plant in the family Lamiaceae, a rare shrub that is endemic to Victoria, Australia. It is a small shrub with leaves mostly in groups of three and white flowers.

== Description ==
Westringia cremnophila is a shrub to 0.1–0.5 m (3.9 in – 1 ft 7.7 in) high, much-branched and thickly covered with slightly flattened white hairs, and found growing out of steep cliffs. The leaves are arranged in whorls mostly in groups of three, oblong or almost linear shaped, 10–20 mm (0.39–0.79 in) long, 1–2 mm (0.039–0.079 in) wide, thickly hairy when young, becoming smooth, margins distinctly rolled under, apex rounded occasionally sharply points and on a petiole 0.4–1 mm (0.016–0.039 in) long. The flowers are in racemes, the corolla about 10 mm (0.39 in) long, white with a mauve tinge and yellow-brown spotted throats. The calyx tube 3–3.5 mm (0.12–0.14 in) long, lobes about 2 mm (0.079 in) long and up to 1 mm (0.039 in) wide and the outer surface thickly covered with white hairs. Flowering occurs in spring.

== Taxonomy and naming ==
Westringia cremnophila was first formally described in 1957 by botanist Norman Wakefield and the description was published in The Victorian Naturalist based on a type specimen collected from "Porphory cliffs above Snowy River, east of Butchers Ridge". The specific epithet (cremnophila) is in reference to its "habitat".

== Distribution and habitat ==
Snowy river westringia is restricted to Tulloch Ard Gorge in the Snowy River National Park in East Gippsland, where it grows on cliff faces above the Snowy River with a north to north-east aspect. Associated plant species include shrubby platysace (Platysace lanceolata), violet daisy-bush (Olearia iodochroa), digger's speedwell (Veronica perfoliata), common fringe-myrtle (Calytrix tetragona) and tall baeckea (Sannantha pluriflora).

== Conservation status and measures ==
As of April 2022 Westringia cremnophila is listed as "vulnerable" under the Commonwealth Environment Protection and Biodiversity Conservation Act 1999.

After previously being listed as "vulnerable" (as of 2014) on the Advisory List of Rare Or Threatened Plants In Victoria and under the Flora and Fauna Guarantee Act 1988 (Vic.), Westringia cremnophila is since October 2021 and as of April 2022 listed as "Endangered" .

Due to the species' restricted habitat in difficult terrain, plants have proved difficult to find over the years, but in 2011 about 500 plants were located. Only around 60 individuals (12%) of the former population of 500 plants remained after the 2019–2020 bushfires. Plants have been propagated and established at the Royal Botanic Gardens Melbourne as an insurance population.
