= Westringia rupicola =

Conservation status
- Vulnerable (EPBC Act)

Scientific classification
- Kingdom: Plantae
- Clade: Tracheophytes
- Clade: Angiosperms
- Clade: Eudicots
- Clade: Asterids
- Order: Lamiales
- Family: Lamiaceae
- Genus: Westringia
- Species: W. rupicola

Binomial name
- Westringia rupicola S.T.Blake, 1959
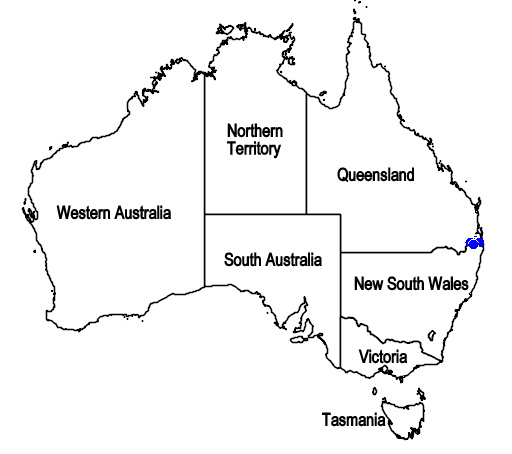
- Known range of Westringia rupicola (in blue)

Species of flowering plant

Westringia rupicola is a species of plant in the mint family that is endemic to Australia.

== Description ==
The species grows as a shrub with pendulous stems 30–50 cm in length. The oval to linear leaves are 2–4.5 mm long and 0.5 mm wide. The flowers are white to pale blue-lilac, with brownish dots.

== Distribution and habitat ==
The species occurs in south-eastern Queensland, including the Springbrook and Lamington National Parks. It grows in crevices in steep rhyolite cliffs. Associated species include Leptospermum microcarpum and Melaleuca comboynensis.

== Conservation ==
The species has been listed as Vulnerable under Australia's EPBC Act. The main threat to its habitat comes from invasive plants such as mistflower.
