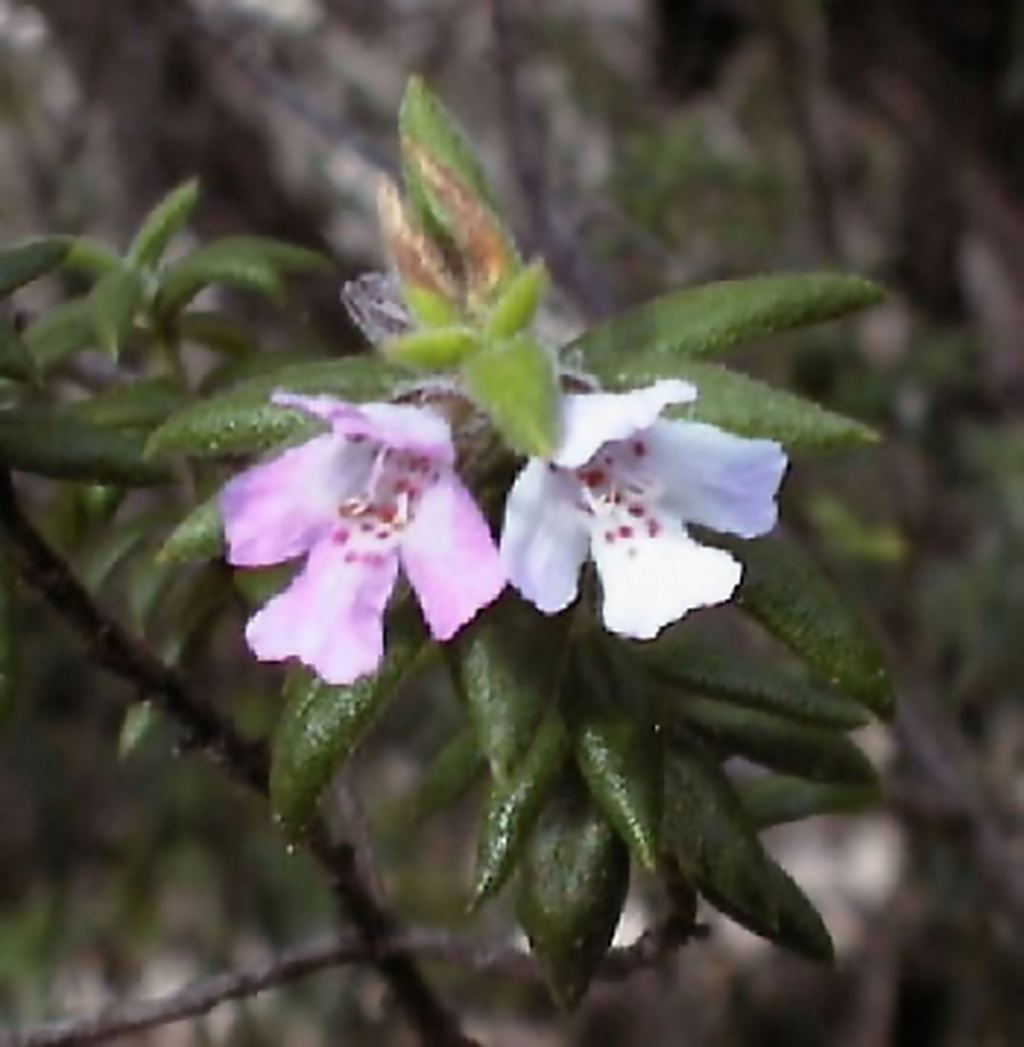
- Flowers

Conservation status
- Vulnerable (EPBC Act)

Scientific classification
- Kingdom: Plantae
- Clade: Tracheophytes
- Clade: Angiosperms
- Clade: Eudicots
- Clade: Asterids
- Order: Lamiales
- Family: Lamiaceae
- Genus: Westringia
- Species: W. davidii

Binomial name
- Westringia davidii B.J.Conn, 1987
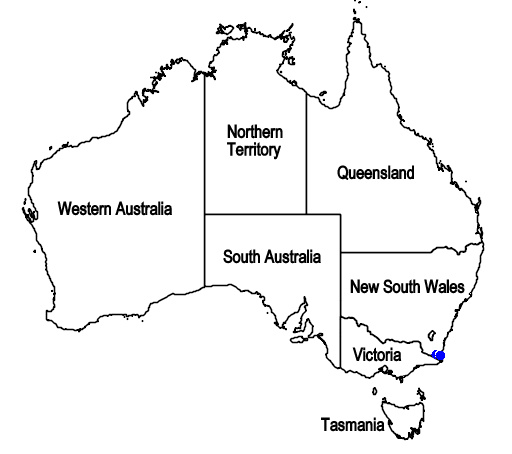
- Known range of Westringia davidii (in blue)

= Westringia davidii =

Species of flowering plant

Westringia davidii, also known as David's Westringia, is a species of plant in the mint family that is endemic to Australia.

== Description ==
The species grows as a shrub to about 2 m in height. The oval leaves are 7–20 mm long and are grouped around the stem in whorls of three. The white or mauve flowers grow in clusters of up to 12 and can appear at any time of year.

== Distribution and habitat ==
The species is found in the coastal ranges of south-eastern New South Wales, west of Pambula and Eden. There it is restricted to shallow, organic loam soils in the ecotone between rocky outcrops vegetated with shrubland and herbs, and open forest dominated by Silvertop Ash.

== Conservation ==
The species is listed as Vulnerable under both Australia's EPBC Act and New South Wales' Biodiversity Conservation Act. Threats include browsing by goats and introduced deer, as well as anthropogenic changes in the frequency of wildfire.
