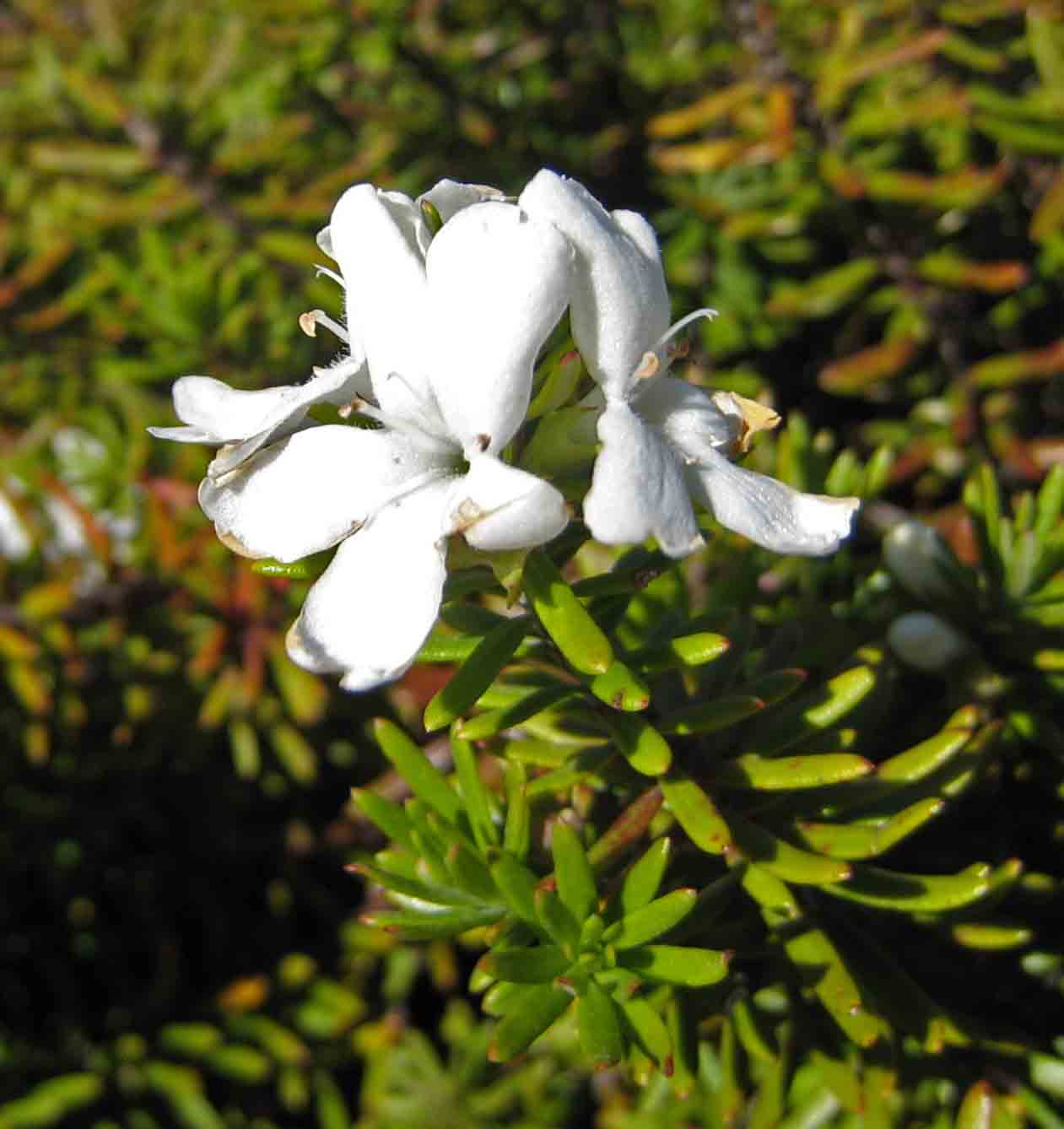

Scientific classification
- Kingdom: Plantae
- Clade: Tracheophytes
- Clade: Angiosperms
- Clade: Eudicots
- Clade: Asterids
- Order: Lamiales
- Family: Lamiaceae
- Genus: Westringia
- Species: W. viminalis

Binomial name
- Westringia viminalis B.J.Conn & Tozer (1993)

= Westringia viminalis =

Species of flowering plant

Westringia viminalis is a flowering plant in the mint family. The specific epithet refers to its long, slender shoots. It is closely related to Westringia fruticosa, which is found on coastal heath and cliffs in New South Wales.

== Description ==
It is a compact or scrambling shrub, growing to 1 m in height. The leaves are crowded, in whorls of three or four, narrowly elliptic, 10–20 mm long and 1–3 mm wide, with recurved edges. The flowers are white, often with pink spots in the throat of the corolla. The seeds are 1.5–2 mm long. The flowering season is from April to December.

== Distribution and habitat ==
The plant is endemic to Australia’s subtropical Lord Howe Island in the Tasman Sea. It occurs on ledges and cliffs, at an elevation of 350–450 m, on Mounts Lidgbird and Gower at the southern end of the island, with a few plants found on exposed sites in the northern hills.
