= Westringia lurida =

Scientific classification
- Kingdom: Plantae
- Clade: Tracheophytes
- Clade: Angiosperms
- Clade: Eudicots
- Clade: Asterids
- Order: Lamiales
- Family: Lamiaceae
- Genus: Westringia
- Species: W. lurida

Binomial name
- Westringia lurida Gand., 1918

Species of flowering plant

Westringia lurida is a species of plant in the mint family that is endemic to Australia. It occurs in the Mallee region of north-western Victoria.
