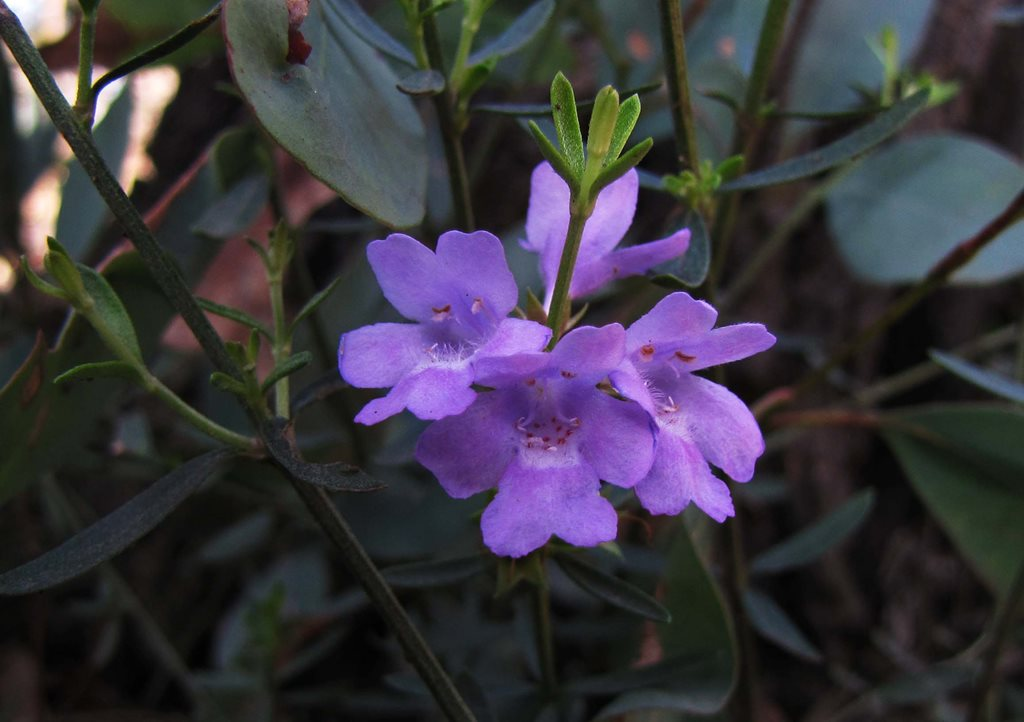

Conservation status
- Endangered (EPBC Act)

Scientific classification
- Kingdom: Plantae
- Clade: Tracheophytes
- Clade: Angiosperms
- Clade: Eudicots
- Clade: Asterids
- Order: Lamiales
- Family: Lamiaceae
- Genus: Westringia
- Species: W. crassifolia

Binomial name
- Westringia crassifolia N.A.Wakef.

= Westringia crassifolia =

Whipstick westringia

Species of shrub

Westringia crassifolia, commonly known as whipstick westringia, is a flowering plant in the family Lamiaceae and is endemic to Victoria, Australia. It is a rare shrub with narrow leaves and lavender-purple or pink flowers in spring.

== Description ==
Westringia crassifolia is an upright, slender shrub growing to 2 m (6 ft 7 in) high, and branches with occasional or moderately covered in short, soft hairs. The dark green leaves are arranged in whorls of 3, narrowly oblong or elliptic, 5–15 mm (0.20–0.59 in) long, 1.5–2.5 mm (0.059–0.098 in) wide, surface covered moderately to thinly with short hairs, margins minutely toothed, apex rounded with a slightly hardened point on a short pedicel. The calyx is green, outer surface thickly to moderately hairy, lobes triangular-shaped, 1.5–2.5 mm (0.059–0.098 in) long, about 1.5 mm (0.059 in) wide. The corolla is blue-mauve or pink, hairy on the outside, 12–14 mm (0.47–0.55 in) long, orange yellow dots in the throat and borne at the end of branches. Flowering occurs in August and September, and the fruit is a dry four-seeded nutlet.

== Taxonomy and naming ==
Westringia crassifolia was first formally described in 1957 by Norman Wakefield and the description was published in The Victorian Naturalist. The specific epithet (crassifolia) means "thick leaved".

== Distribution and habitat ==
Whipstick westringia is restricted to two locations, near Bendigo and the other in the Little Desert growing on sand or sandy soils on lower slopes and in shallow gullies.

== Conservation ==
Westringia crassifolia is listed as "endangered" under the Commonwealth Environment Protection and Biodiversity Conservation Act 1999, "endangered" on the Department of Sustainability and Environment's Advisory List of Rare Or Threatened Plants In Victoria and "threatened" under the Victorian Flora and Fauna Guarantee Act 1988.There are estimated to be about 640 plants left in the wild.
