= Westringia grandifolia =

Conservation status
- Endangered (NCA)

Scientific classification
- Kingdom: Plantae
- Clade: Tracheophytes
- Clade: Angiosperms
- Clade: Eudicots
- Clade: Asterids
- Order: Lamiales
- Family: Lamiaceae
- Genus: Westringia
- Species: W. grandifolia

Binomial name
- Westringia grandifolia F.Muell. ex Benth., 1870
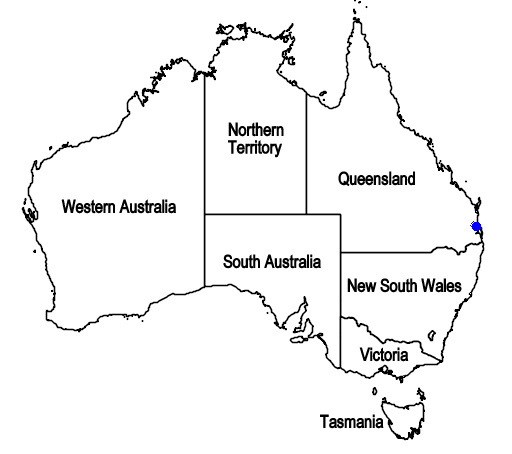
- Known distribution of Westringia grandifolia (in blue)

Synonyms
- Westringia rosmariniformis var. grandiflora (F.Muell. ex Benth.) C.T.White & W.D.Francis

Species of flowering plant

Westringia grandifolia is a species of plant in the mint family that is endemic to Australia. It occurs in wallum habitats in south-eastern Queensland, and is listed as Endangered under Queensland's Nature Conservation Act 1992.
