= Westringia ophioglossa =

Scientific classification
- Kingdom: Plantae
- Clade: Tracheophytes
- Clade: Angiosperms
- Clade: Eudicots
- Clade: Asterids
- Order: Lamiales
- Family: Lamiaceae
- Genus: Westringia
- Species: W. ophioglossa

Binomial name
- Westringia ophioglossa R.W.Davis & P.Jobson, 2013
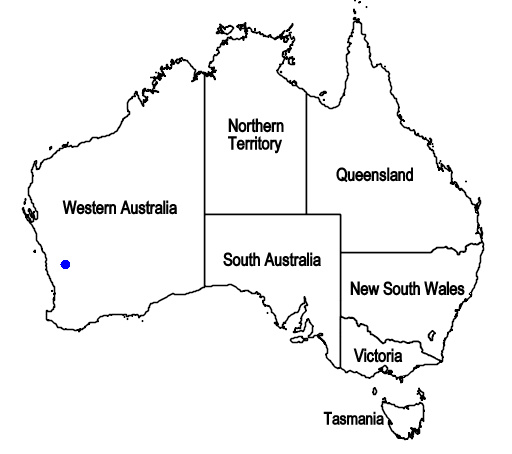
- Known range of Westringia ophioglossa (in blue)

Species of flowering plant

Westringia ophioglossa is a species of plant in the mint family that is endemic to Western Australia.

== Etymology ==
The specific epithet ophioglossa (‘snake's tongue’) refers to the appearance of the forked lateral petals of the flowers.

== Description ==
The species grows as a compact, erect shrub to 1.3 m in height. The leaves are 6.5–10 mm long and 0.9–1.3 mm wide, occurring in crowded whorls of four. The flowers are white with purple dots, appearing from late November to December.

== Distribution and habitat ==
The species occurs in the Avon Wheatbelt IBRA bioregion of south-western Australia. It is known only from a single roadside population, near the town of Maya, in open mallee woodland in association with Eucalyptus leptopoda and Grevillea paradoxa.
