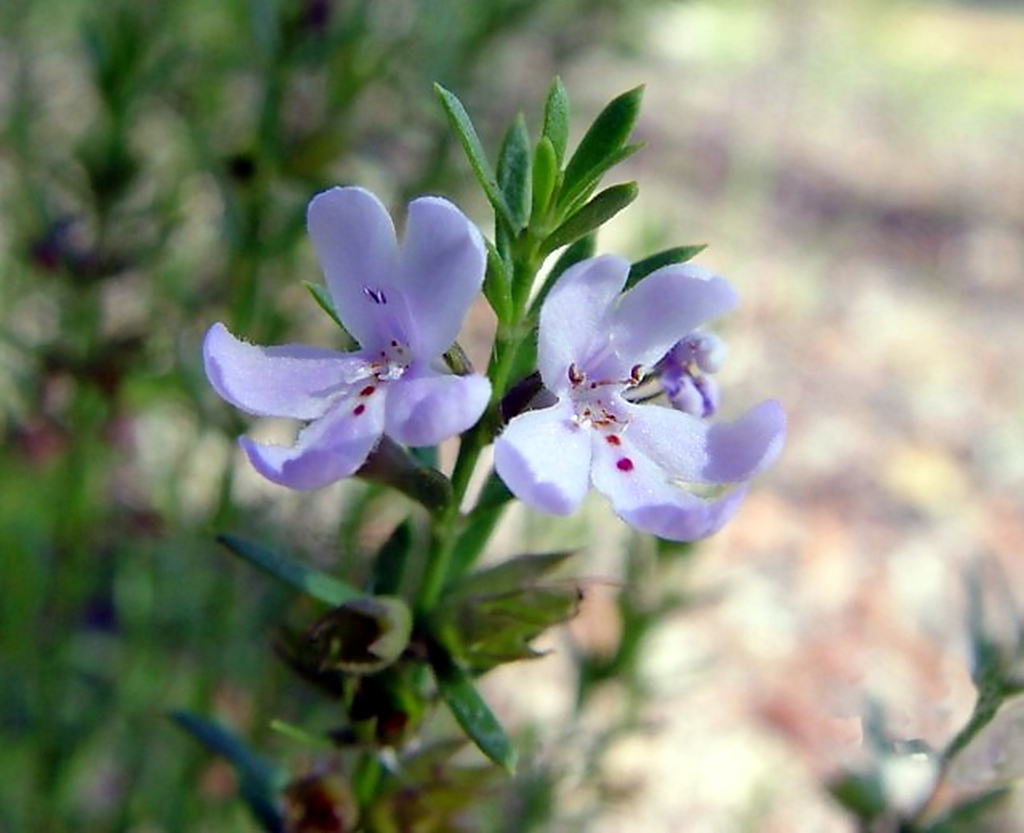
- Flowers

Scientific classification
- Kingdom: Plantae
- Clade: Tracheophytes
- Clade: Angiosperms
- Clade: Eudicots
- Clade: Asterids
- Order: Lamiales
- Family: Lamiaceae
- Genus: Westringia
- Species: W. tenuicaulis

Binomial name
- Westringia tenuicaulis C.T.White & W.D.Francis, 1921
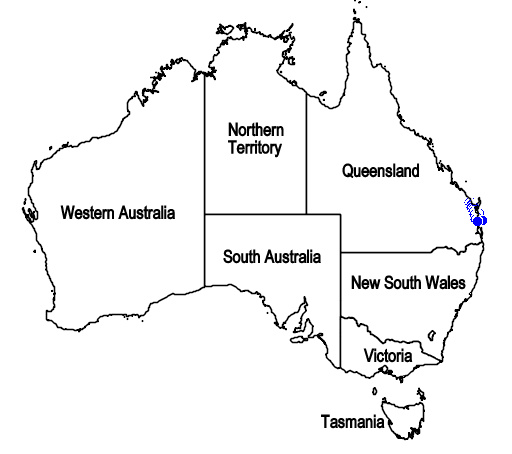
- Known range of Westringia tenuicaulis (in blue)

= Westringia tenuicaulis =

Species of flowering plant

Westringia tenuicaulis, also known as the Tufted Westringia, is a species of plant in the mint family that is endemic to Australia. Its natural range is restricted to the Fraser Coast Region of south-eastern Queensland, between Bundaberg and Sippy Downs.
