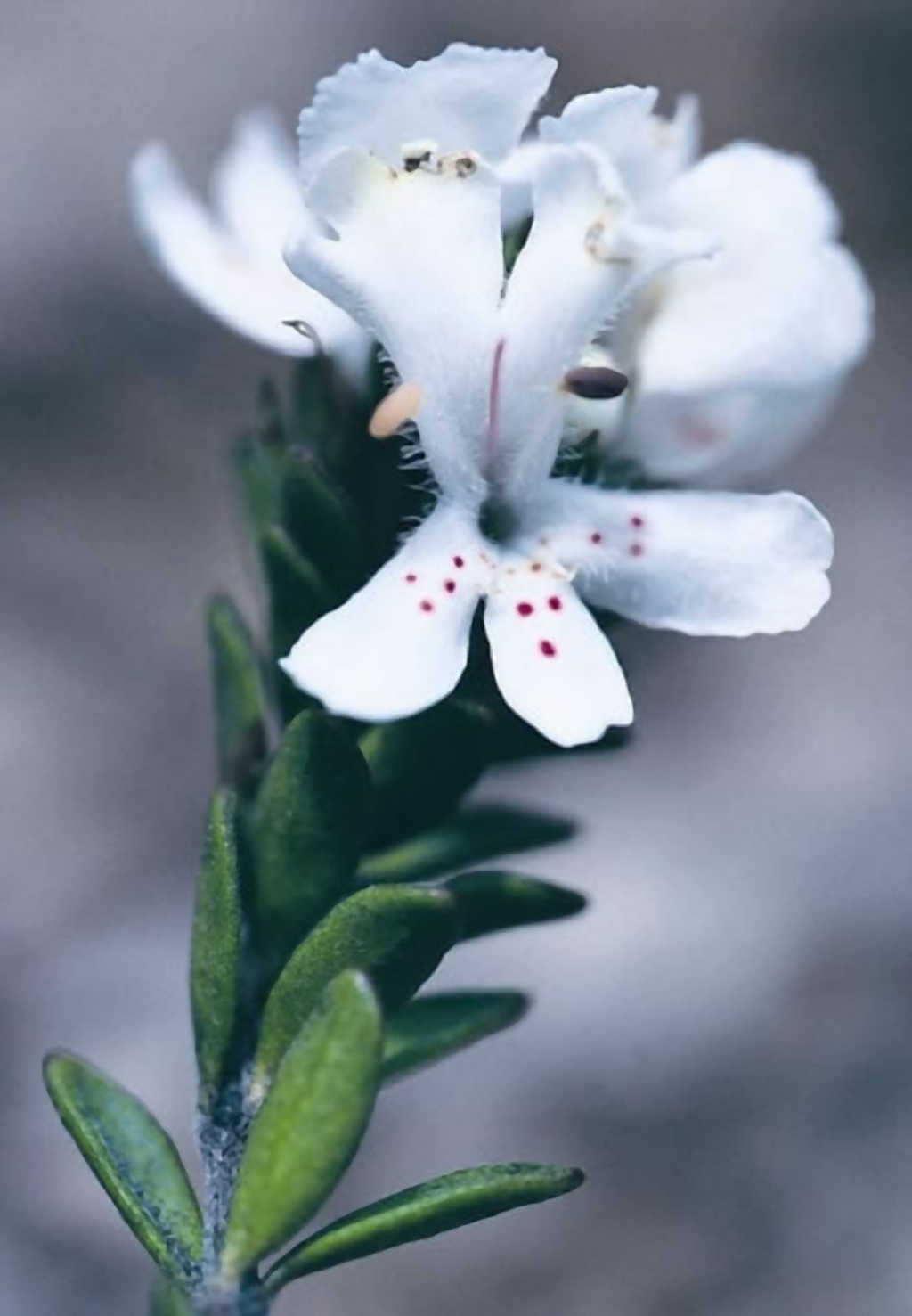
- Westringia kydrensis flower, showing the red dots on the lobes

Conservation status
- Endangered (EPBC Act)

Scientific classification
- Kingdom: Plantae
- Clade: Tracheophytes
- Clade: Angiosperms
- Clade: Eudicots
- Clade: Asterids
- Order: Lamiales
- Family: Lamiaceae
- Genus: Westringia
- Species: W. kydrensis

Binomial name
- Westringia kydrensis B.J.Conn, 1992

= Westringia kydrensis =

Species of flowering plant

Westringia kydrensis, also known as the Kydra Westringia, is a species of plant in the mint family that is endemic to Australia.

== Description ==
The species grows as an erect shrub to about 40 cm in height. The leaves are 8 mm long and 3.5 mm wide, and are grouped around the stem in threes. The white flowers have reddish dots at the bases of the lobes.

== Distribution and habitat ==
The species is found only in the South Eastern Highlands IBRA bioregion, in south-eastern New South Wales, in rocky areas of the Kydra Reefs region south-east of Cooma. It grows in heathland in granite or quartzite soils, in association with larger shrubs such as Allocasuarina nana and Banksia canei.

== Conservation ==
The species is listed as Endangered under both Australia's EPBC Act and New South Wales' Biodiversity Conservation Act. Threats include browsing by goats, as well as increases in the frequency of wildfire.
