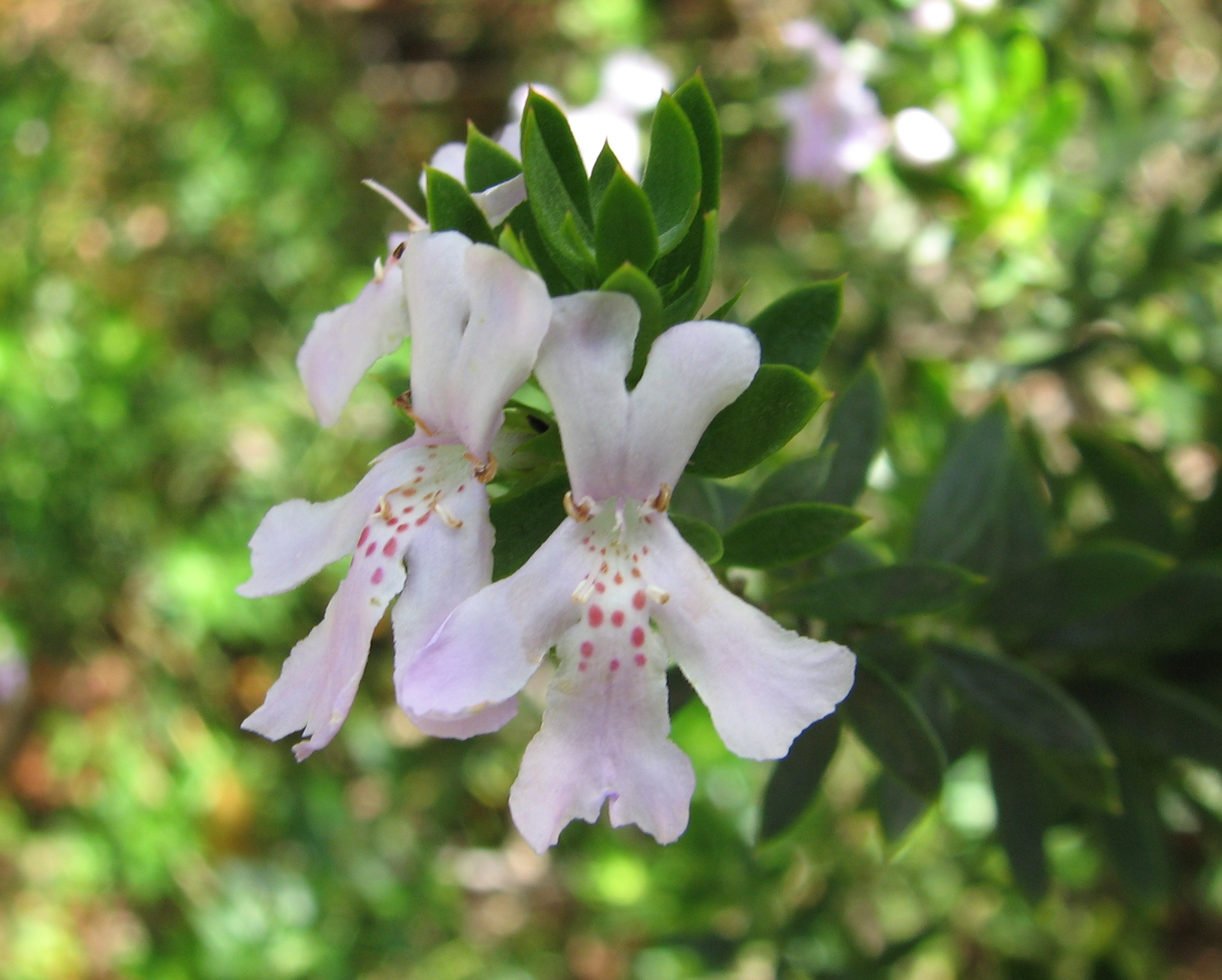

Scientific classification
- Kingdom: Plantae
- Clade: Tracheophytes
- Clade: Angiosperms
- Clade: Eudicots
- Clade: Asterids
- Order: Lamiales
- Family: Lamiaceae
- Genus: Westringia
- Species: W. glabra

Binomial name
- Westringia glabra R.Br.

= Westringia glabra =

Violet westringia

Species of shrub

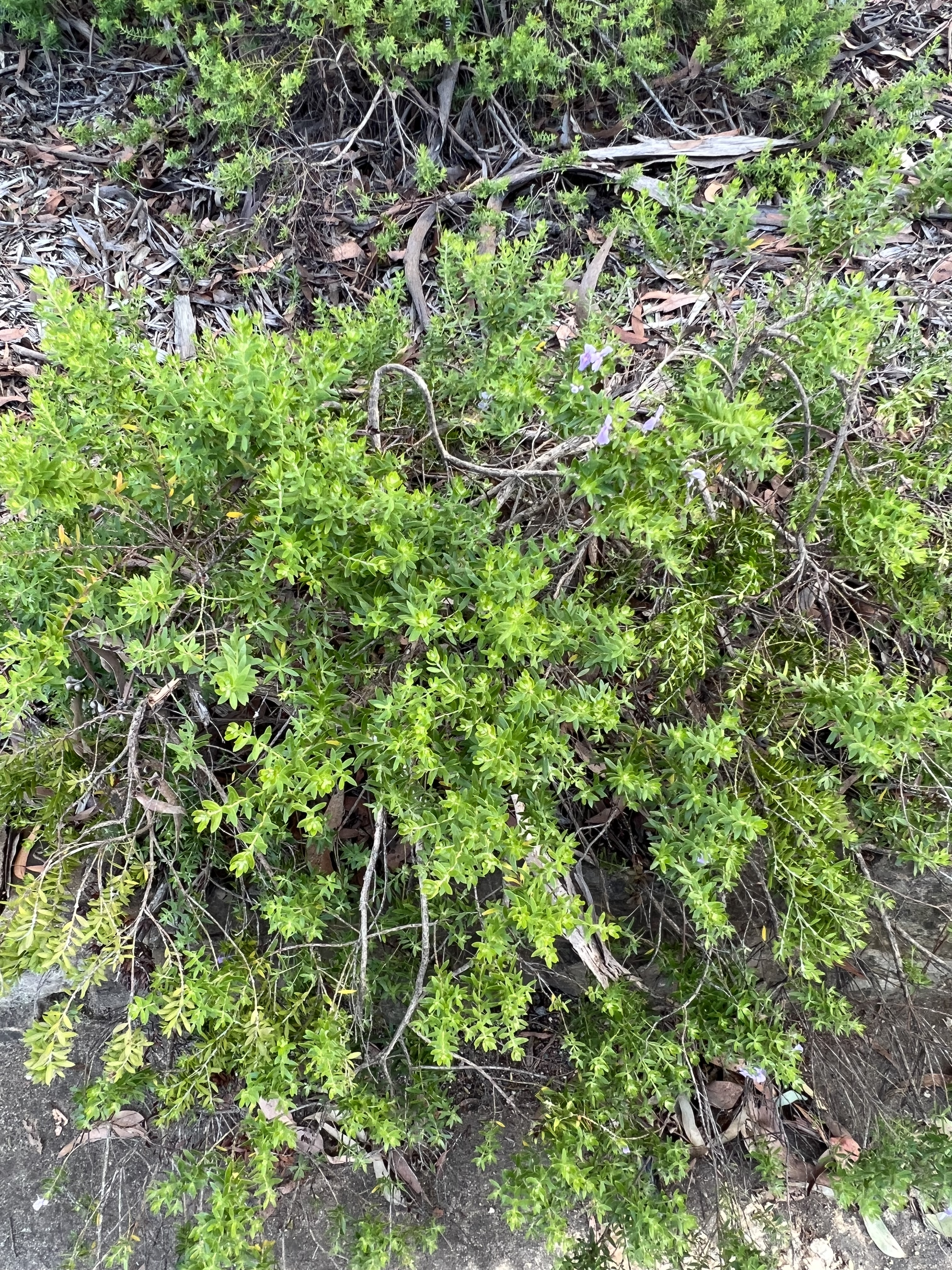
Habit

Westringia glabra, commonly known as violet westringia, is a flowering plant in the family Lamiaceae and is endemic to Australia. It is a small shrub with oval-shaped leaves and pinkish, mauve or purple flowers.

== Description ==
Westringia glabra is a small shrub to 0.5–1 m (1 ft 8 in – 3 ft 3 in) high with pink, mauve or purple flowers that have darker purple spots in the throat. The leaves are borne in whorls of three, narrow-elliptic to lance-shaped, 12–20 mm (0.47–0.79 in) long, 3–4 mm (0.12–0.16 in) wide, edges rolled under, upper and lower surface smooth to sparsely hairy and the petiole about 1 mm (0.039 in) long. The green calyx outer surface usually has occasional hairs, lobes more or less triangular shaped, 3–3.7 mm (0.12–0.15 in) long and 1–1.5 mm (0.039–0.059 in) wide. Flowering occurs throughout the year.

== Taxonomy and naming ==
Westringia glabra was first formally described in 1810 by botanist Robert Brown and the description was published in Prodromus Florae Novae Hollandiae. The specific epithet (glabra) is a Latin word meaning "hairless", "bald" or "smooth".

== Distribution and habitat ==
Violet westringia grows on skeletal soils in gorges, rocky slopes and woodland in New South Wales and Victoria.
