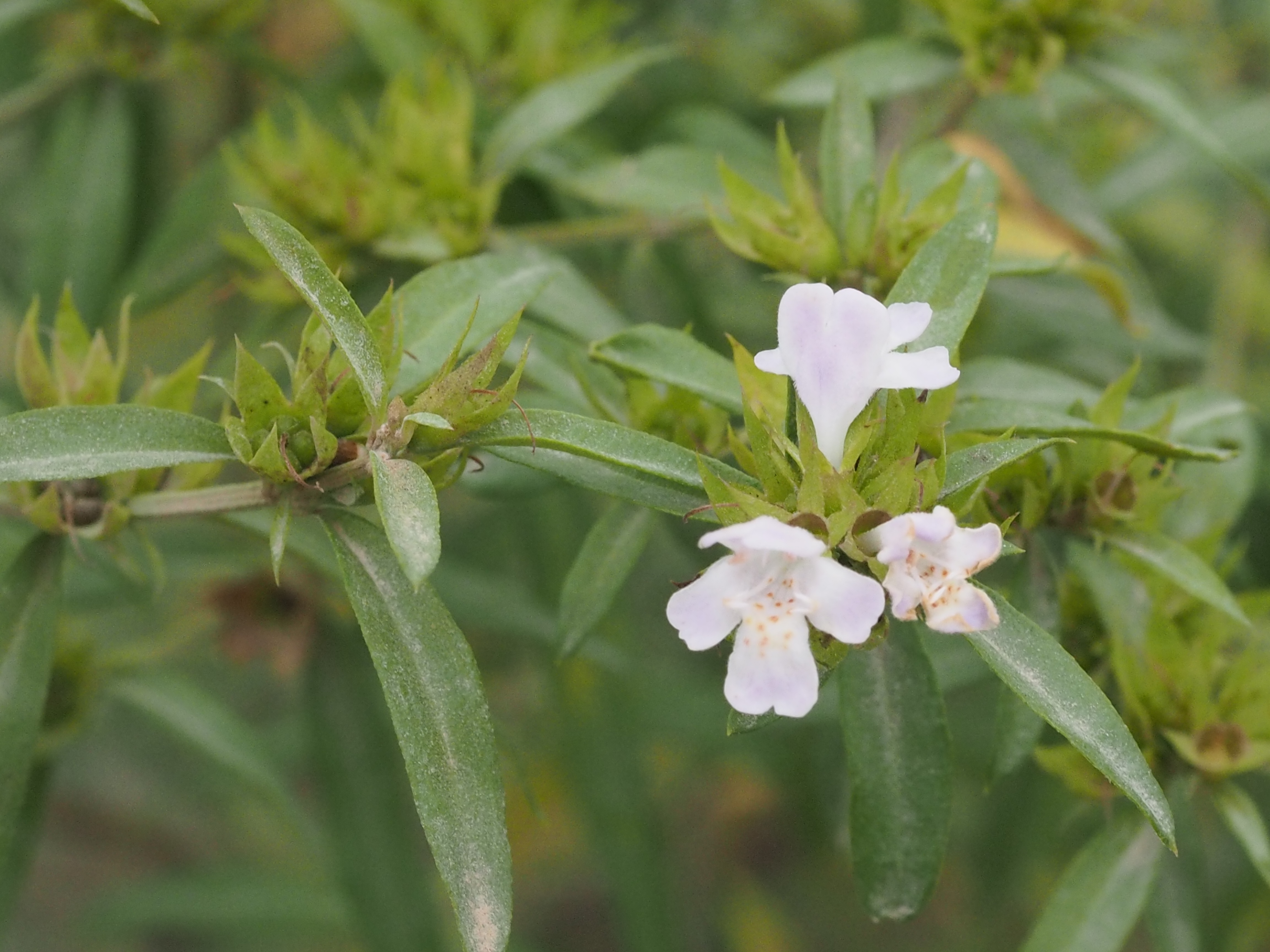

Scientific classification
- Kingdom: Plantae
- Clade: Tracheophytes
- Clade: Angiosperms
- Clade: Eudicots
- Clade: Asterids
- Order: Lamiales
- Family: Lamiaceae
- Genus: Westringia
- Species: W. amabilis

Binomial name
- Westringia amabilis B.Boivin

= Westringia amabilis =

Species of shrub

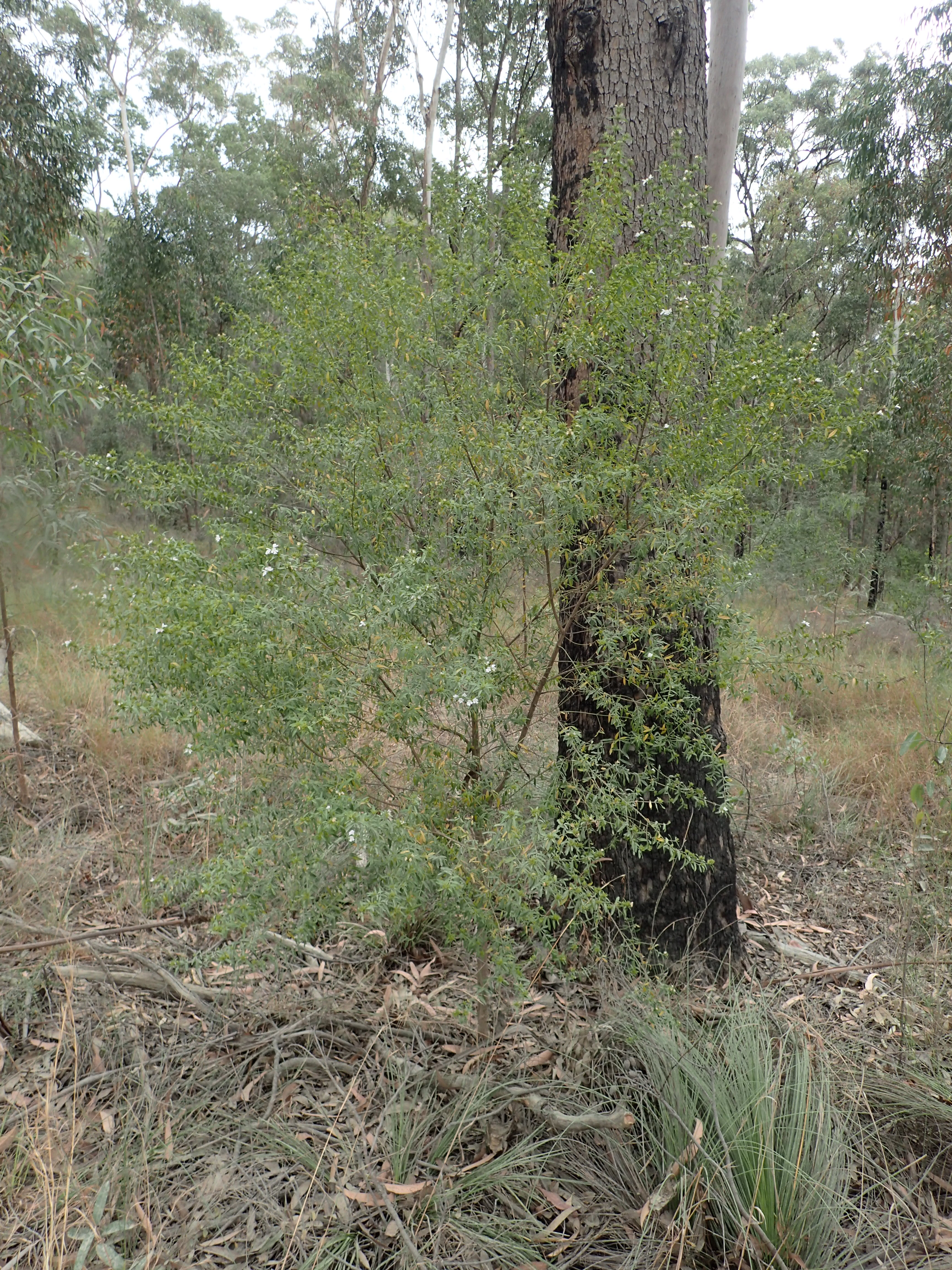
Habit

Westringia amabilis is a species of flowering plant in the family Lamiaceae and grows in New South Wales and Queensland. It is a small shrub with ovate-shaped leaves and light mauve to white flowers and brownish spots in the throat.

== Description ==
Westringia amabilis is a shrub 1–3 m (3 ft 3 in – 9 ft 10 in) high with an open habit. The leaves are arranged in whorls of three, oval to narrowly oval shaped, 16–25 mm (0.63–0.98 in) long, 4–8.5 mm (0.16–0.33 in) wide, margins smooth and usually slightly curved under, upper and lower surface sparsely hairy on a petiole 1.5–2 mm (0.059–0.079 in) long. The bracteoles 3.5–4.5 mm (0.14–0.18 in) long, the calyx is green, lobes triangular shaped, tube 3–3.5 mm (0.12–0.14 in) long, 1–3 mm (0.039–0.118 in) wide and the outer surface has occasional hairs. The corolla 10–15 mm (0.39–0.59 in) long, and is light mauve to white with brownish spots in the throat. Flowering occurs throughout the year.

== Taxonomy and naming ==
Westringia amabilis was first formally described in 1949 by Joseph Robert Bernard Boivin and the description was published in Proceedings of the Royal Society of Queensland. The specific epithet (amabilis) means "loveable".

== Distribution and habitat ==
This westringia grows in rocky locations in forests and sometimes along roadsides north of the Manning River in New South Wales and Queensland.
