= Westringia lucida =

Conservation status
- Critically Endangered (FFG Act 1988)

Scientific classification
- Kingdom: Plantae
- Clade: Tracheophytes
- Clade: Angiosperms
- Clade: Eudicots
- Clade: Asterids
- Order: Lamiales
- Family: Lamiaceae
- Genus: Westringia
- Species: W. lucida

Binomial name
- Westringia lucida B.Boivin, 1949
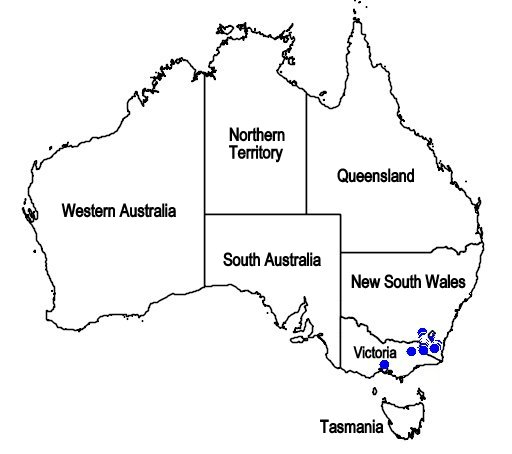
- Known range of Westringia lucida (in blue)

Species of flowering plant

Westringia lucida, also known as shining westringia, is a species of plant in the mint family that is endemic to Australia.

== Description ==
The species grows as a dense shrub to 0.5 m in height. The oval leaves are about 8–14 mm long and 5–8 mm wide, appearing in whorls of three. The flowers appear in early summer; they are white with small orange-red dots.

== Distribution and habitat ==
The species is found in the Australian Alps IBRA bioregion in south-eastern New South Wales and north-eastern Victoria, from Kosciuszko National Park to the vicinity of Mount Bogong, in rocky areas with snow gum woodland or alpine heath.
