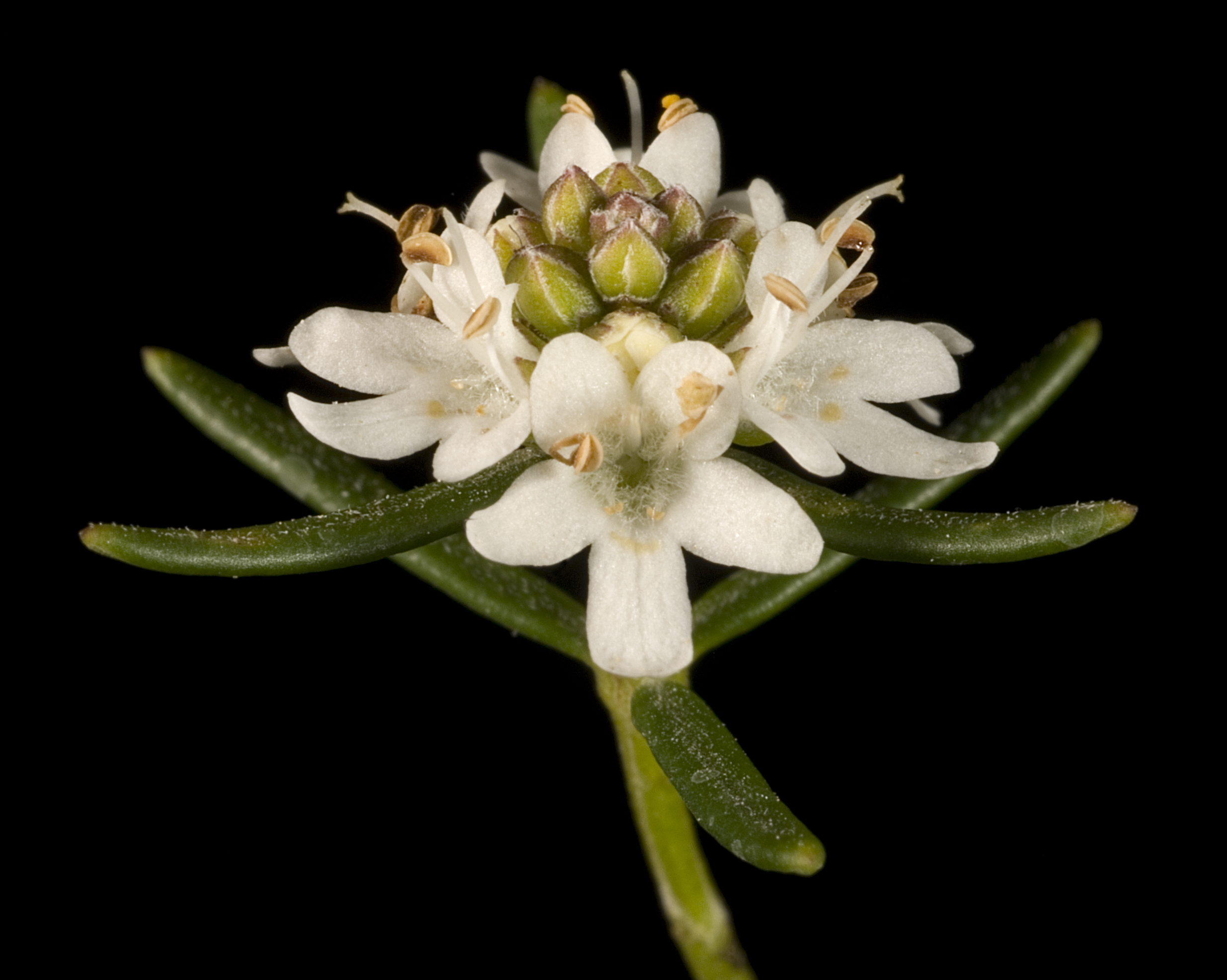

Scientific classification
- Kingdom: Plantae
- Clade: Tracheophytes
- Clade: Angiosperms
- Clade: Eudicots
- Clade: Asterids
- Order: Lamiales
- Family: Lamiaceae
- Genus: Westringia
- Species: W. cephalantha

Binomial name
- Westringia cephalantha F.Muell.
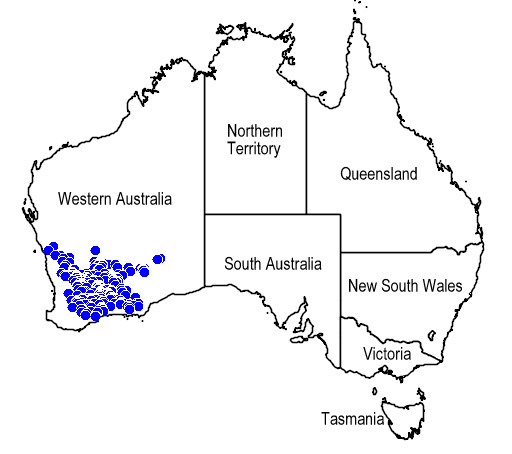

= Westringia cephalantha =

Species of shrub

Westringia cephalantha is a shrub in the Lamiaceae family that is endemic to Western Australia.

== Description ==
It is an erect, compact shrub growing from 10 cm to 150 cm high, on sandy and clayey soils or laterite. Its white flowers may be seen from July to December or January.

== Distribution ==
It is found in Beard's Eremaean and South-West Provinces.

== Taxonomy ==
The species was formally described in 1868 by botanist Ferdinand von Mueller in Fragmenta Phytographiae Australiae, from a specimen collected by James Drummond. There are no synonyms.
