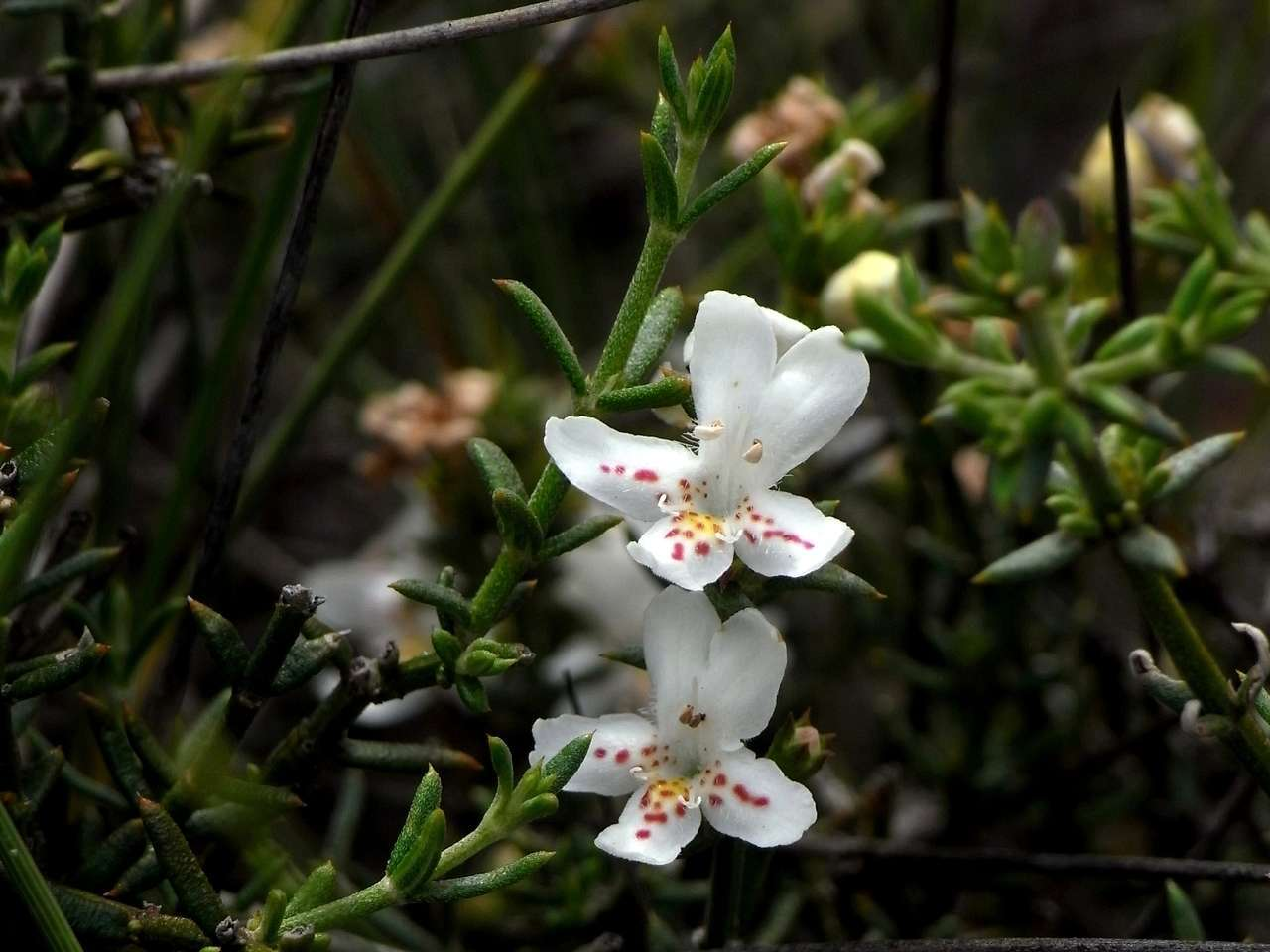

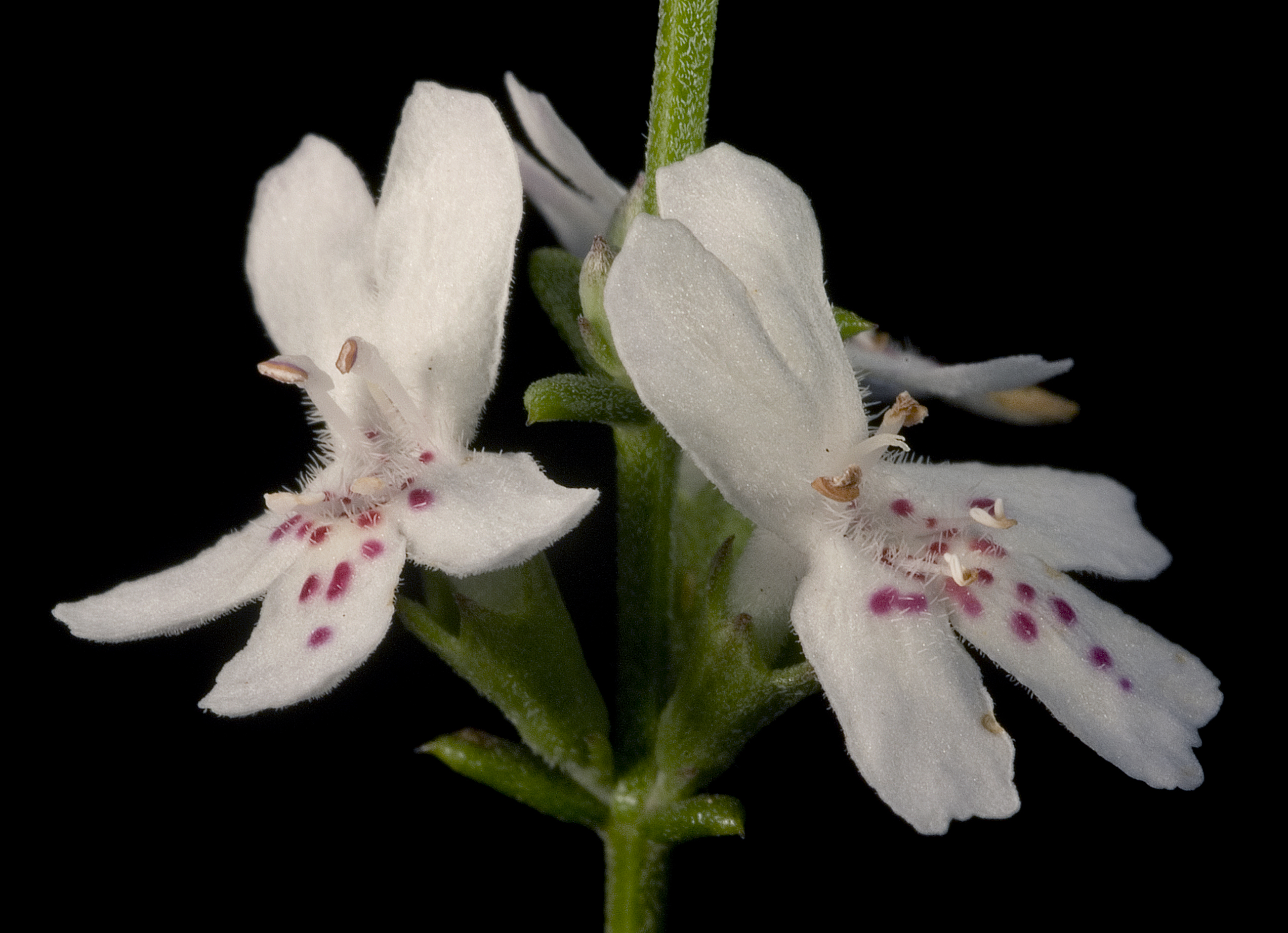

Scientific classification
- Kingdom: Plantae
- Clade: Tracheophytes
- Clade: Angiosperms
- Clade: Eudicots
- Clade: Asterids
- Order: Lamiales
- Family: Lamiaceae
- Genus: Westringia
- Species: W. rigida

Binomial name
- Westringia rigida R.Br.
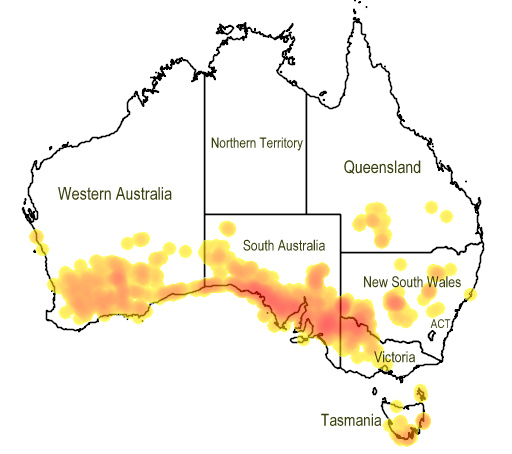

Synonyms
- Westringia cinerea R.Br. Westringia grevillina F.Muell. Westringia rigida var. brachyphylla Ostenf. Westringia rigida var. brevifolia Benth. Westringia rigida var. dolichophylla Ostenf. Westringia rigida f. gracilior Diels & E.Pritz.

= Westringia rigida =

Species of shrub

Westringia rigida commonly known as stiff westringia is a flowering shrub in the family Lamiaceae. It is a perennial shrub with white flowers and is endemic to Australia.

== Description ==
Westringia rigida is a shrub growing 30–60 cm (12–24 in) high, rounded, stiff and often with tangled branches. The sessile leaves mostly borne in whorls of three, dark green, linear to slightly wider on lower half, up to 1–2 mm (0.039–0.079 in) wide, 10 mm (0.39 in) long, margins recurved or revolute, both surfaces sparsely to densely hairy and a short point at the apex. The outer surface of the green calyx is densely hairy, bracteoles up to 1–1.5 mm (0.039–0.059 in) long, corolla 6–7 mm (0.24–0.28 in) long, white, frequently with a mauve tinge, two upper lobes, and three lower lobes with reddish to orange-brown small dots. Flowering occurs mostly in spring and the fruit is a wrinkled achene.

== Taxonomy and naming ==
The species was formally described in 1810 by botanist Robert Brown and the description was published in Prodromus florae Novae Hollandiae. The specific epithet (rigida) means "stiff".

== Distribution and habitat ==
Stiff westringia grows on sandy soils in mallee and in dry forests in Queensland, New South Wales, Western Australia, South Australia and Victoria.
