= Westringia saxatilis =

Scientific classification
- Kingdom: Plantae
- Clade: Tracheophytes
- Clade: Angiosperms
- Clade: Eudicots
- Clade: Asterids
- Order: Lamiales
- Family: Lamiaceae
- Genus: Westringia
- Species: W. saxatilis

Binomial name
- Westringia saxatilis B.J.Conn, 1987
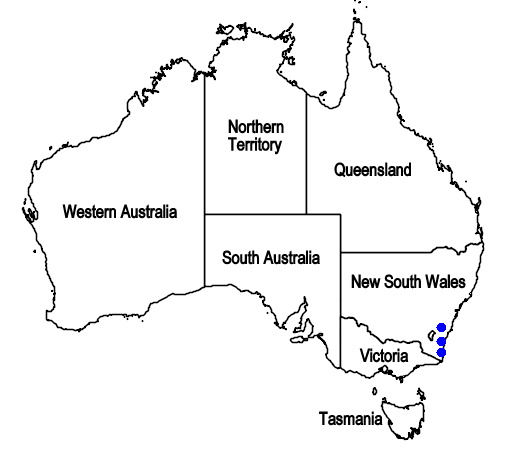
- Known range of the species (in blue)

Species of flowering plant

Westringia saxatilis is a species of plant in the mint family that is endemic to Australia.

== Description ==
The species grows as a shrub to about 0.5–1 m in height. The leaves are 11–23 mm long and 3–5 mm wide, and are grouped around the stem in whorls of 3–5. The flowers are white with yellowish dots.

== Distribution and habitat ==
The species is found in the Moruya district of south-eastern New South Wales, where it grows on rocky rhyolite outcrops in dense low shrubland.
