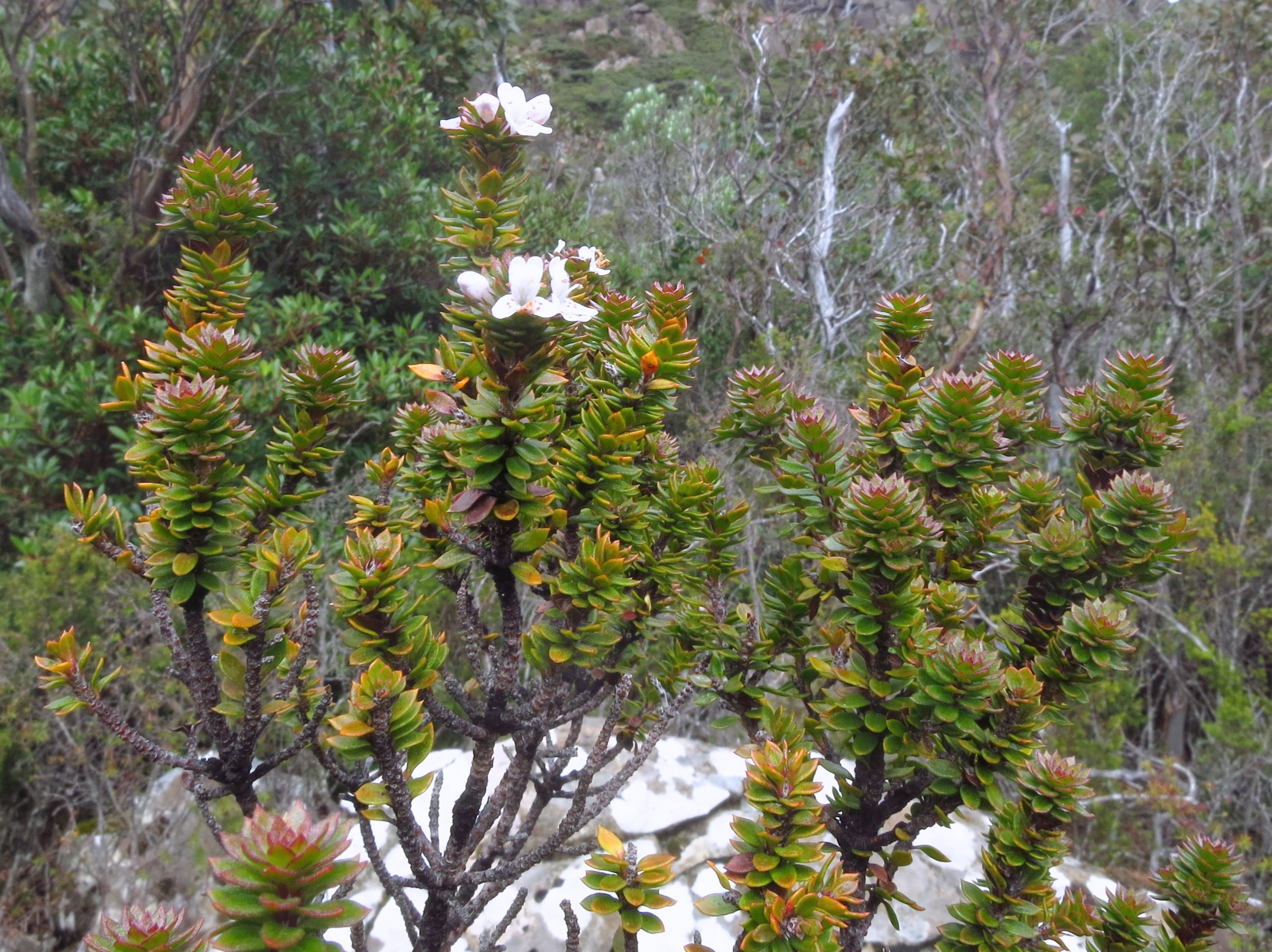
- Flowering shrub

Scientific classification
- Kingdom: Plantae
- Clade: Tracheophytes
- Clade: Angiosperms
- Clade: Eudicots
- Clade: Asterids
- Order: Lamiales
- Family: Lamiaceae
- Genus: Westringia
- Species: W. rubiifolia

Binomial name
- Westringia rubiifolia R.Br., 1810
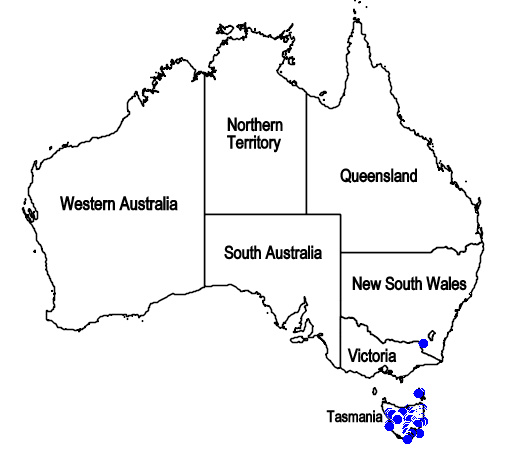
- Known range of Westringia rubiifolia (in blue)

Synonyms
- Westringia rubiifolia var. subsericea Benth.

= Westringia rubiifolia =

Species of flowering plant

Westringia rubiifolia, also known as sticky westringia, is a species of plant in the mint family that is endemic to the Australian state of Tasmania.

== Description ==
The species grows as a many-branched dense shrub to 0.3–1 m. The flowers are white to pale pink, with lilac dots.

== Distribution and habitat ==
The species is widespread in Tasmania, occurring in wet eucalypt forests, along streams and in alpine areas.
