= Westringia capitonia =

Scientific classification
- Kingdom: Plantae
- Clade: Tracheophytes
- Clade: Angiosperms
- Clade: Eudicots
- Clade: Asterids
- Order: Lamiales
- Family: Lamiaceae
- Genus: Westringia
- Species: W. capitonia

Binomial name
- Westringia capitonia G.R.Guerin, 2009
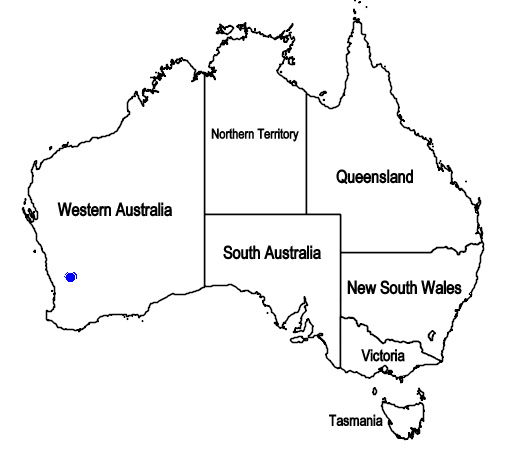
- Known distribution of Westringia capitonia (in blue)

Species of flowering plant

Westringia capitonia is a species of plant in the mint family that is endemic to Western Australia.

== Description ==
The species grows as a shrub. The leaves are 4–20 mm long and 0.8–1.7 mm wide. The flowers are white, appearing in December.

== Distribution and habitat ==
The species occurs in the Avon Wheatbelt IBRA bioregion of Southwest Australia.
