= Westringia sericea =

Conservation status
- Vulnerable (NCA)

Scientific classification
- Kingdom: Plantae
- Clade: Tracheophytes
- Clade: Angiosperms
- Clade: Eudicots
- Clade: Asterids
- Order: Lamiales
- Family: Lamiaceae
- Genus: Westringia
- Species: W. sericea

Binomial name
- Westringia sericea B.Boivin, 1949
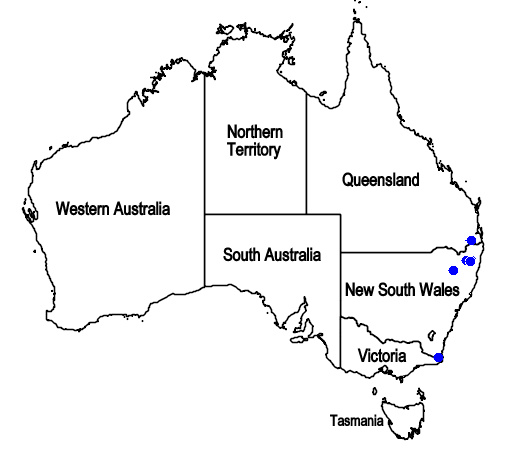
- Known range of Westringia sericea (in blue)

Species of flowering plant

Westringia sericea, also known as native rosemary or silky rosemary, is a species of plant in the mint family that is endemic to Australia.

== Description ==
The species grows as a shrub to 0.3–2 m in height. The lanceolate to linear leaves are about 20–30 mm long and 1.5–4 mm wide, appearing in whorls of three. The flowers appear in spring; they are pale mauve in colour with small orange to brownish dots.

== Distribution and habitat ==
The species is found in south-eastern Queensland and north-eastern New South Wales. It grows on rocky slopes and ridges in sclerophyll forest.
