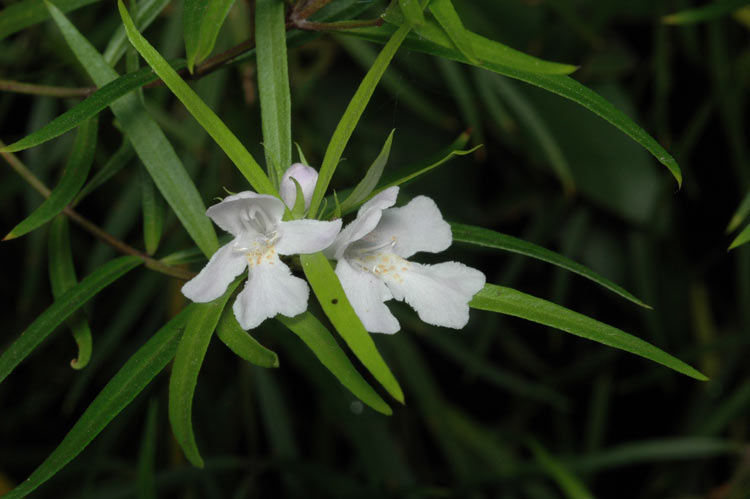

Conservation status
- Near Threatened (NCA)

Scientific classification
- Kingdom: Plantae
- Clade: Tracheophytes
- Clade: Angiosperms
- Clade: Eudicots
- Clade: Asterids
- Order: Lamiales
- Family: Lamiaceae
- Genus: Westringia
- Species: W. blakeana

Binomial name
- Westringia blakeana B.Boivin
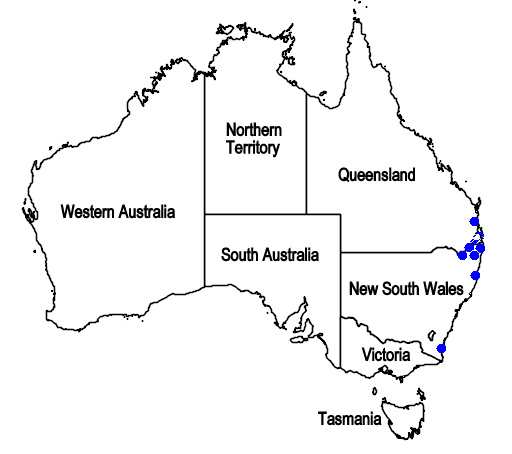
- Known range of Westringia blakeana (in blue)

= Westringia blakeana =

Blake's mint bush

Species of flowering plant

Westringia blakeana is a flowering plant in the family Lamiaceae and grows in New South Wales and Queensland. It is a small shrub with mauve to whitish flowers with brown spots and leaves arranged in whorls.

== Description ==
Westringia blakeana is a shrub that grows to 1–4 m (3 ft 3 in – 13 ft 1 in) high. The leaves are borne in whorls of three, lanceolate to linear shaped, about 20–60 mm (0.79–2.36 in) long, 3–5 mm (0.12–0.20 in) wide, margins slightly curved under, both surfaces smooth or with occasional hairs and the petiole 1–4 mm (0.039–0.157 in) long. The bracteoles 3.8–5.5 mm (0.15–0.22 in) long, the calyx is green, smooth or with occasional hairs on the outer surface. The corolla about 10 mm (0.39 in) long, petals triangular shaped, narrow, 5–5.5 mm (0.20–0.22 in) long, 1–1.3 mm (0.039–0.051 in) wide, light mauve to whitish with brown spots. Flowering may occur throughout the year though mostly in spring.

== Taxonomy and naming ==
Westringia blakeana was first formally described in 1949 by Joseph Robert Bernard Boivin from a specimen collected by Stanley Thatcher Blake in Lamington National Park at an altitude of 2,400 feet, and the description was published in Proceedings of the Royal Society of Queensland.

== Distribution and habitat ==
This westringia grows in wet sclerophyll forest and rainforest edges, often near streams or waterfalls in north-eastern New South Wales and south-eastern Queensland.
