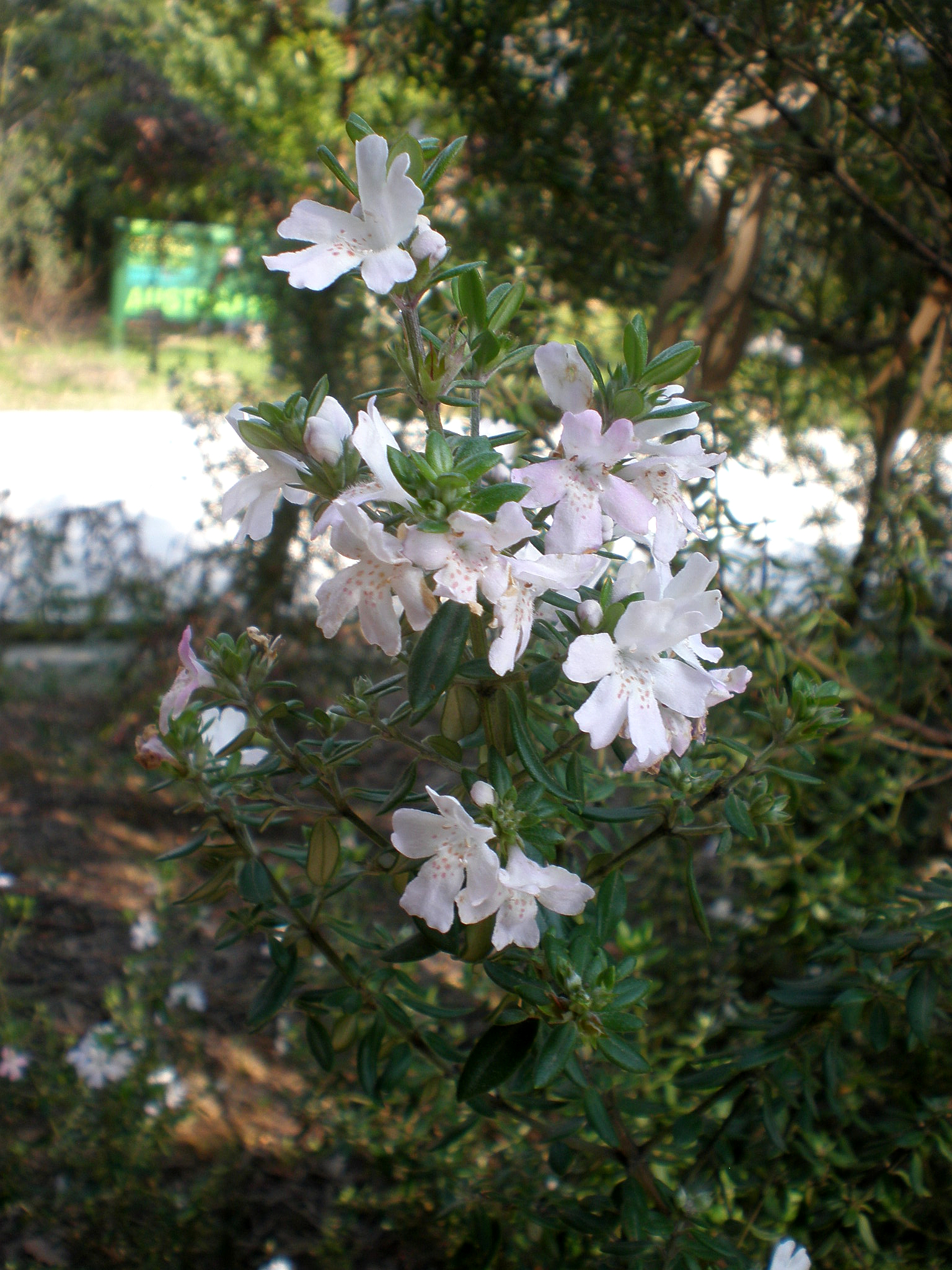
- Flowers

Scientific classification
- Kingdom: Plantae
- Clade: Tracheophytes
- Clade: Angiosperms
- Clade: Eudicots
- Clade: Asterids
- Order: Lamiales
- Family: Lamiaceae
- Genus: Westringia
- Species: W. brevifolia

Binomial name
- Westringia brevifolia Benth., 1834
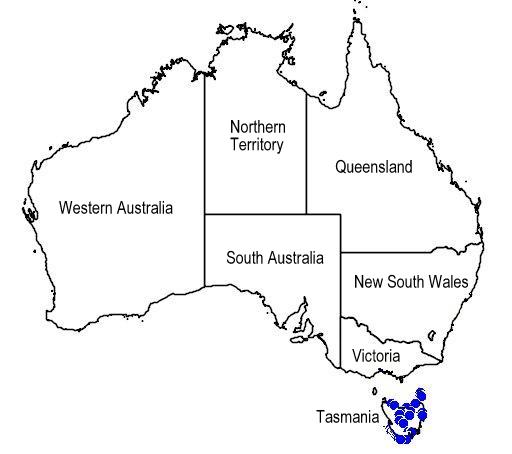
- Known distribution of Westringia brevifolia (in blue)

Synonyms
- Westringia brevifolia var. raleighii (B.Boivin) W.M.Curtis; Westringia raleighii B.Boivin; Westringia rosmariniformis var. brevifolia (Benth.) Domin

= Westringia brevifolia =

Species of flowering plant

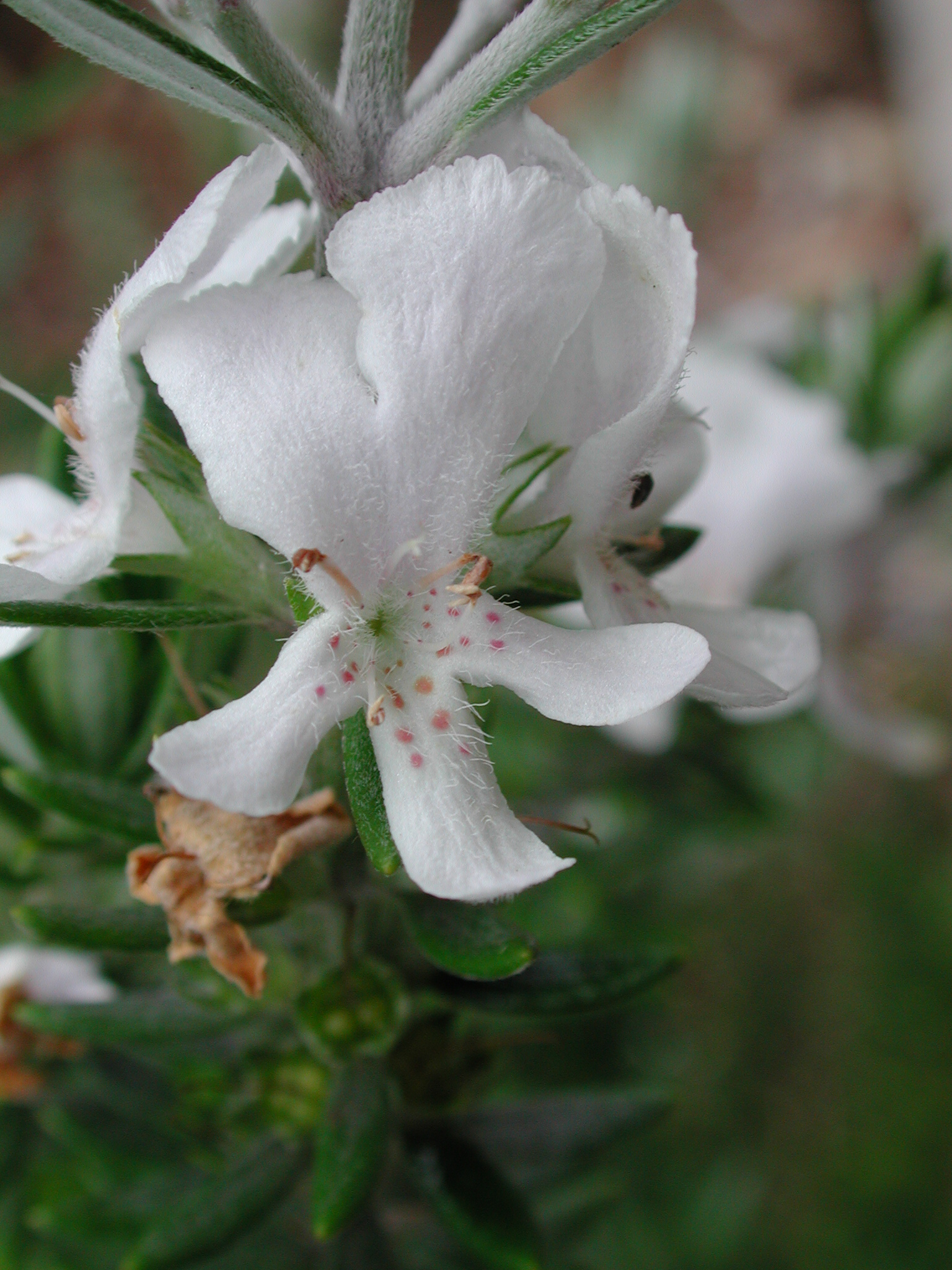
Inflorescence of W. brevifolia, photograph courtesy of Robert Wiltshire.

Westringia brevifolia Benth., commonly referred to as Greater Shortleaf Westringia is member of the Lamiaceae (sometimes referred to as Labiatae) family, subfamily, Prostantheroideae and one of four Westringia species native Tasmania, Australia. This evergreen shrub somewhat resembles rosemary and is similar in appearance to another Tasmanian species W. rigida, but can be distinguished by its shorter calyx lobes

== Description ==
The leaves are a medium green, either elliptic-lanceolate or oblong on shape with a softly pointed tip and shortly revolute margins. They are usually 6-8mm (0.24-0.31 in) long by 1.2-

3mm (0.05-0.12 in) wide, emerging from white stems in whorls of four, with a silver-white abaxial surface and densely appressed hairs covering the leaves and stems. Conspicuous, insect attracting flowers appear late Winter to Summer with white to mauve petals and medium pink markings on the throat. Influences are asymmetric and pedicellate, with solitary flowers emerging in the axils of new growth. The corolla consists of five fused petals that are twice as long as the calyx and covered in sparse hairs. The lobes are narrow with two slightly wider petals at the top of the flower forming the upper lip and three narrower ones forming the lower lip. Calyxes are persistent and narrow-triangular with a tapered end, 5-6mm (0.20-0.24in) in length and over half as long as the tube. The fruit consists of four, reticulate-rugose nutlets encased in a dry schizocarp, appearing after flowering, usually still encased by the calyx. Reproductive parts consist of four stamens, with slightly pink-brown anthers, and a white pistil. The upper two stamens are fertile, while the lower two stamens are infertile, or staminode.

== Taxonomy ==
Written accounts of W. brevifolia first appeared in English botanist, George Bentham’s Labiatarum Genera et Species 5. in the year 1834. The name has changed slightly over the years, going by both Westringia rosmariniformis and Westringia raleighii, but has been recorded in the Australian Plant census as W. brevifolia since 2010.

== Subspecies ==
Westringia brevifolia var. raleighii, commonly known as Coast Westringia, is a dense shrub with limited distribution, growing slightly larger than the main form at 1.5m (4.92ft) by 1.5m (4.92ft) with white flowers during the summer months. Leaves are 6-8mm (0.24-0.31in) long and 3.5mm (0.14in) wide. Calyxes are roughly the same size as the standard variety at c. 6mm (0.24in). (4). Var. raleighii has a limited distribution and is listed as an endangered species under the Tasmanian Threatened Species Protection Act 1995.

== Cultivation ==
A popular shrub in landscaping with many cultivated varieties such as ‘Lilac and Lace’, a varigated variety growing up to 1.5m (4.91 in) high by 1.5m (4.91 in) wide with pale leaves, green in the centre with cream coloured margins (hairs absent), and mauve flowers from Summer to Winter; and ‘Silver Lining’, which thrives in dry coastal areas, also growing c. 1.5m wide, however in contrast to other varieties, in grows in a rather prostrate form.
