= Westringia cheelii =

Scientific classification
- Kingdom: Plantae
- Clade: Tracheophytes
- Clade: Angiosperms
- Clade: Eudicots
- Clade: Asterids
- Order: Lamiales
- Family: Lamiaceae
- Genus: Westringia
- Species: W. cheelii

Binomial name
- Westringia cheelii Maiden & Betche, 1910
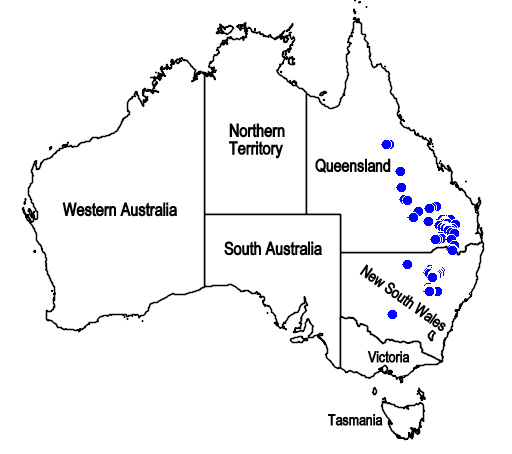
- Known distribution of Westringia cheelii (in blue)

Species of flowering plant

Westringia cheelii is a species of plant in the mint family that is endemic to Australia.

== Description ==
The species grows as a spreading shrub to 0.3–1.5 m in height. The oval leaves are 3–7 mm long and 1.2–2 mm wide. The flowers are white, with purplish to brownish dots, appearing from August to November.

== Distribution and habitat ==
The species occurs in northern New South Wales and southern Queensland, on deep, gravel-rich, sandy soils, in mallee woodland and dry sclerophyll forest.
