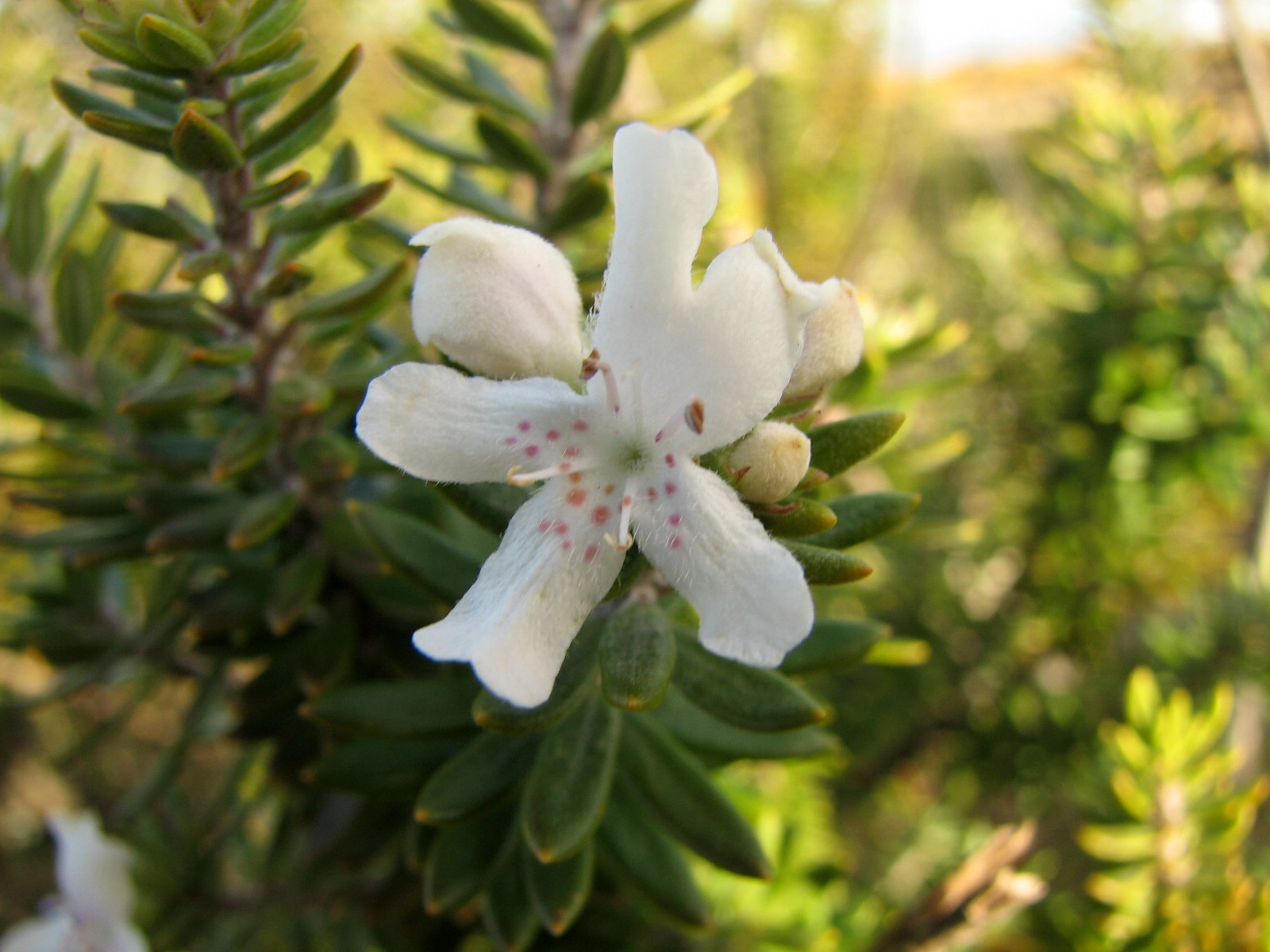
- Westringia fruticosa

Scientific classification
- Kingdom: Plantae
- Clade: Tracheophytes
- Clade: Angiosperms
- Clade: Eudicots
- Clade: Asterids
- Order: Lamiales
- Family: Lamiaceae
- Subfamily: Prostantheroideae
- Genus: Westringia; Sm.
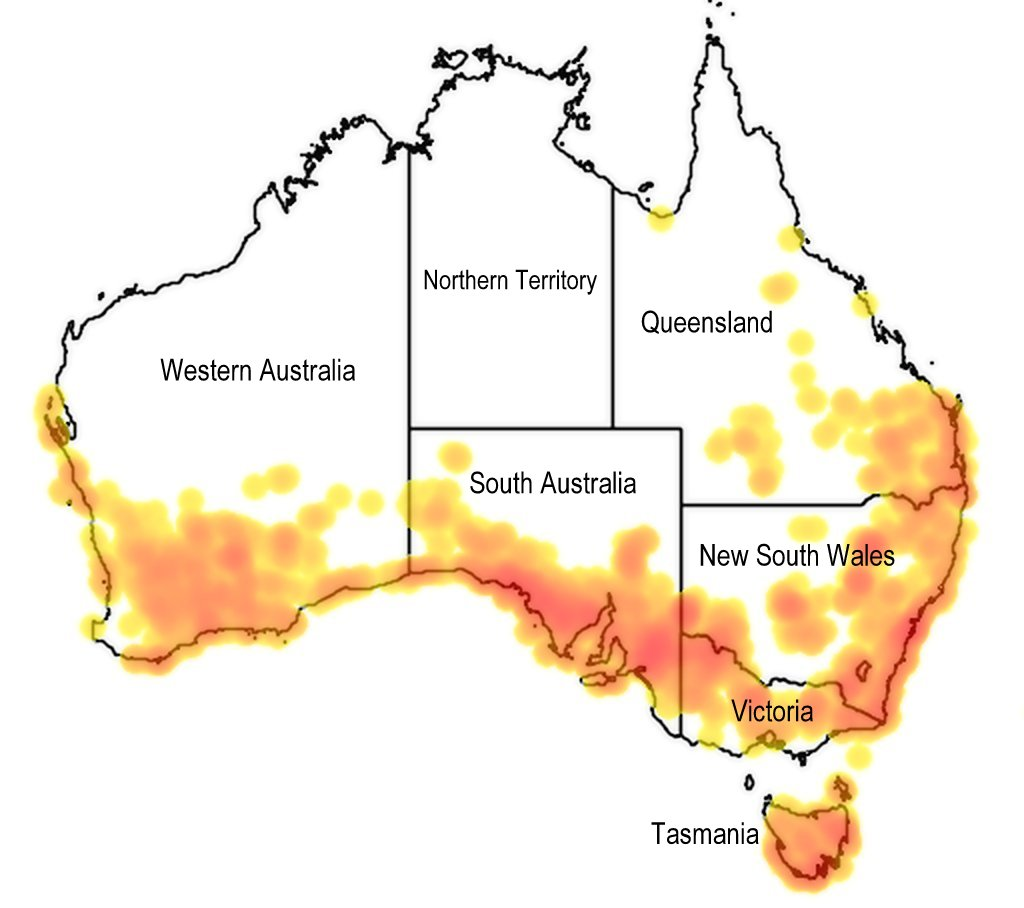
- Range of the genus

= Westringia =

Genus of Australian shrubs

Westringia is a genus of Australian shrubs. As with other members of the mint family their upper petal (or lip) is divided into two lobes. There are four stamens - the upper two are fertile while the lower two are reduced to staminodes. The leaves are in whorls of 3 or 4.

== Distribution ==
Westringia has been found in the wild in all 6 states of Australia, as well as on Norfolk Island, but not in the Northern Territory.

== Species list ==
The following is a list of the species of Westringia described and recognised by Plants of the World Online at Kew Gardens and the Australian Plant Census:

- Westringia acifolia G.R.Guerin (W.A.)
- Westringia amabilis B.Boivin (N.S.W., Qld.)
- Westringia angustifolia R.Br. - scabrous westringia (Tas.)
- Westringia blakeana B.Boivin - Blake's mint-bush
- Westringia brevifolia Benth. - greater shortleaf westringia
- Westringia capitonia G.R.Guerin
- Westringia cephalantha F.Muell.
- Westringia cheelii Maiden & Betche
- Westringia crassifolia N.A.Wakef. - whipstick westringia (Vic.)
- Westringia cremnophila N.A.Wakef. - Snowy River westringia (Vic.)
- Westringia dampieri R.Br. - shore westringia (W.A.)
- Westringia davidii B.J.Conn - David's westringia
- Westringia discipulorum S.Moore - white button bush
- Westringia eremicola A.Cunn. ex Benth. - slender westringia
- Westringia fitzgeraldensis R.W.Davis & Jobson
- Westringia fruticosa (Willd.) Druce - coastal rosemary
- Westringia glabra R.Br. - violet westringia
- Westringia grandifolia Benth.
- Westringia kydrensis B.J.Conn - Kydra westringia
- Westringia longifolia R.Br. - long-leaved westringia
- Westringia lucida B.Boivin - shining westringia
- Westringia lurida Gand.
- Westringia ophioglossa R.W.Davis & Jobson
- Westringia parvifolia C.T.White & W.D.Francis
- Westringia rigida R.Br. - stiff westringia
- Westringia rubiifolia R.Br. - sticky westringia
- Westringia rupicola S.T.Blake
- Westringia saxatilis B.J.Conn
- Westringia senifolia F.Muell. - alpine westringia
- Westringia sericea B.Boivin - silky rosemary; native rosemary
- Westringia tenuicaulis C.T.White & W.D.Francis - tufted westringia
- Westringia viminalis B.J.Conn & Tozer - Lord Howe westringia
