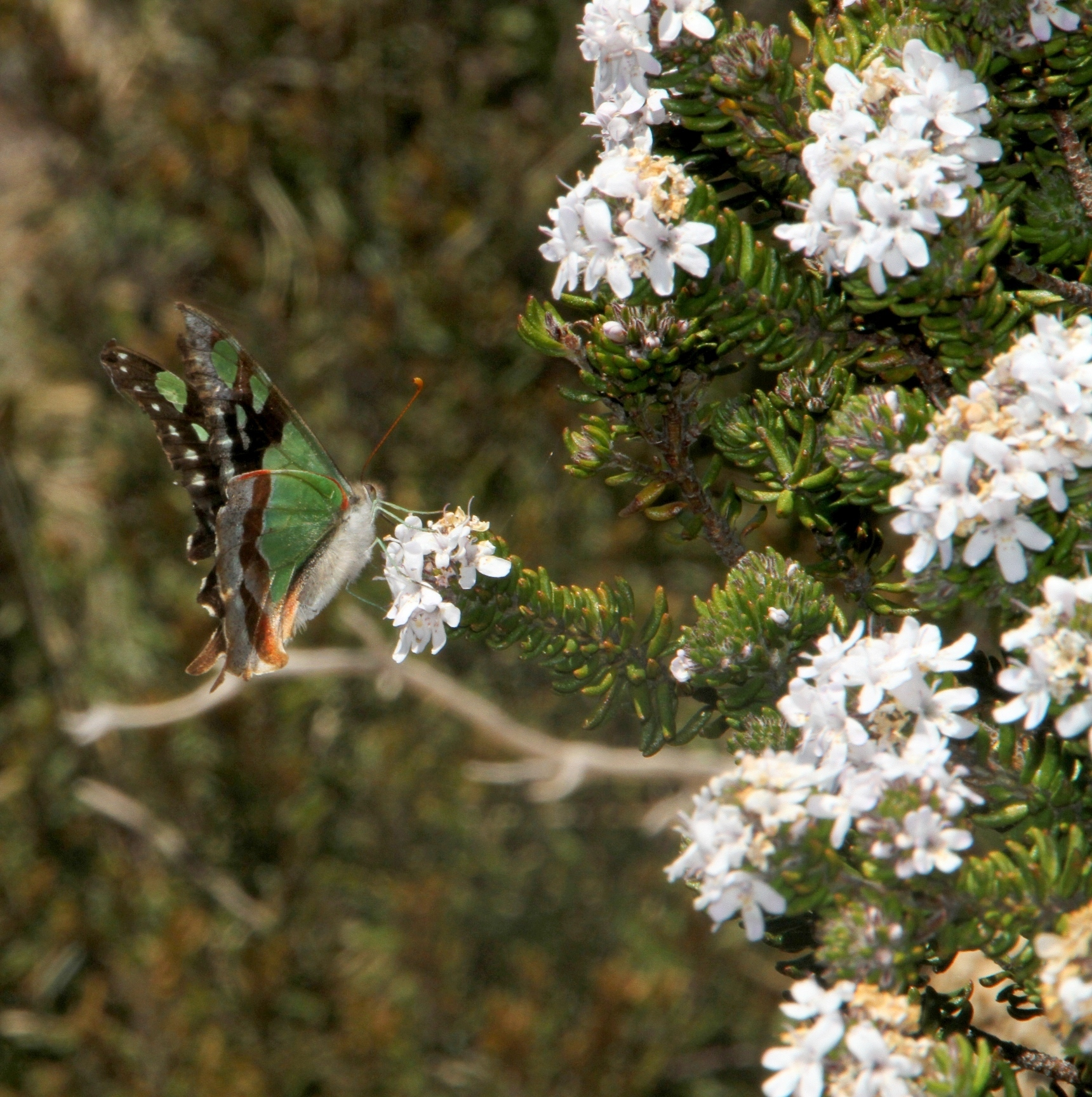

Scientific classification
- Kingdom: Plantae
- Clade: Tracheophytes
- Clade: Angiosperms
- Clade: Eudicots
- Clade: Asterids
- Order: Lamiales
- Family: Lamiaceae
- Genus: Westringia
- Species: W. senifolia

Binomial name
- Westringia senifolia F.Muell.

= Westringia senifolia =

Species of shrub

Westringia senifolia, commonly known as alpine westringia, is a shrub that is endemic to Victoria, Australia.

== Taxonomy ==
The species was first formally described in 1855 by Victorian Government Botanist Ferdinand von Mueller, based on plant material collected from Mount Buffalo.

In Western Australia, plants previously known as W. senifolia var. canescens are currently identified as Westringia baxteri.

== Description ==
It grows to 2 metres high and has narrow leaves. These are green and glossy above and pale and hairy underneath. White flowers with red spots appear between December and February in the species' native range.

== Range ==
It occurs on high, rocky mountains including Mount Buffalo, Mount Buller, Mount Wellington and Mount Donna Buang.
