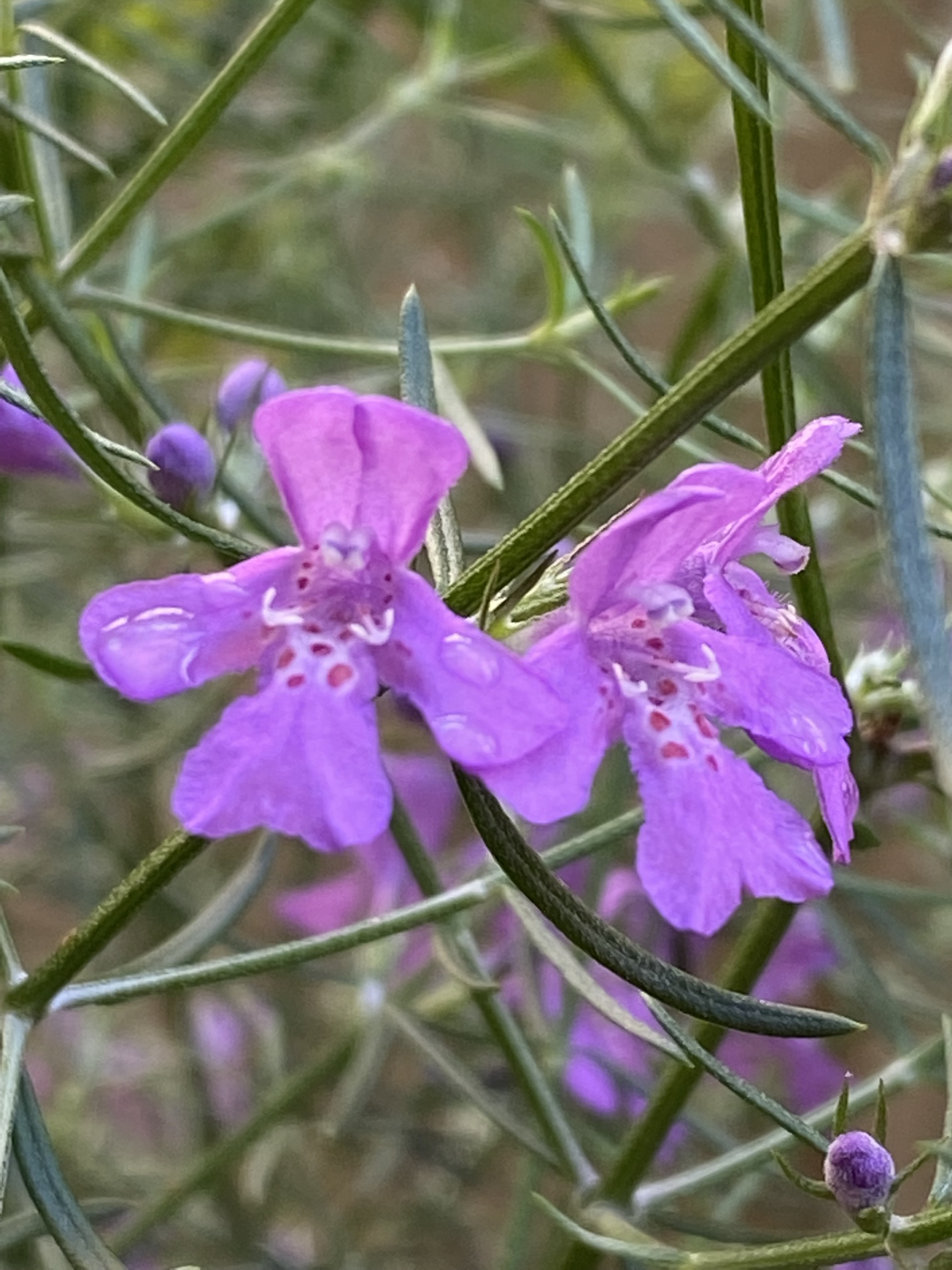

Scientific classification
- Kingdom: Plantae
- Clade: Tracheophytes
- Clade: Angiosperms
- Clade: Eudicots
- Clade: Asterids
- Order: Lamiales
- Family: Lamiaceae
- Genus: Westringia
- Species: W. eremicola

Binomial name
- Westringia eremicola A.Cunn. ex Benth.

= Westringia eremicola =

Slender westringia

Species of plant

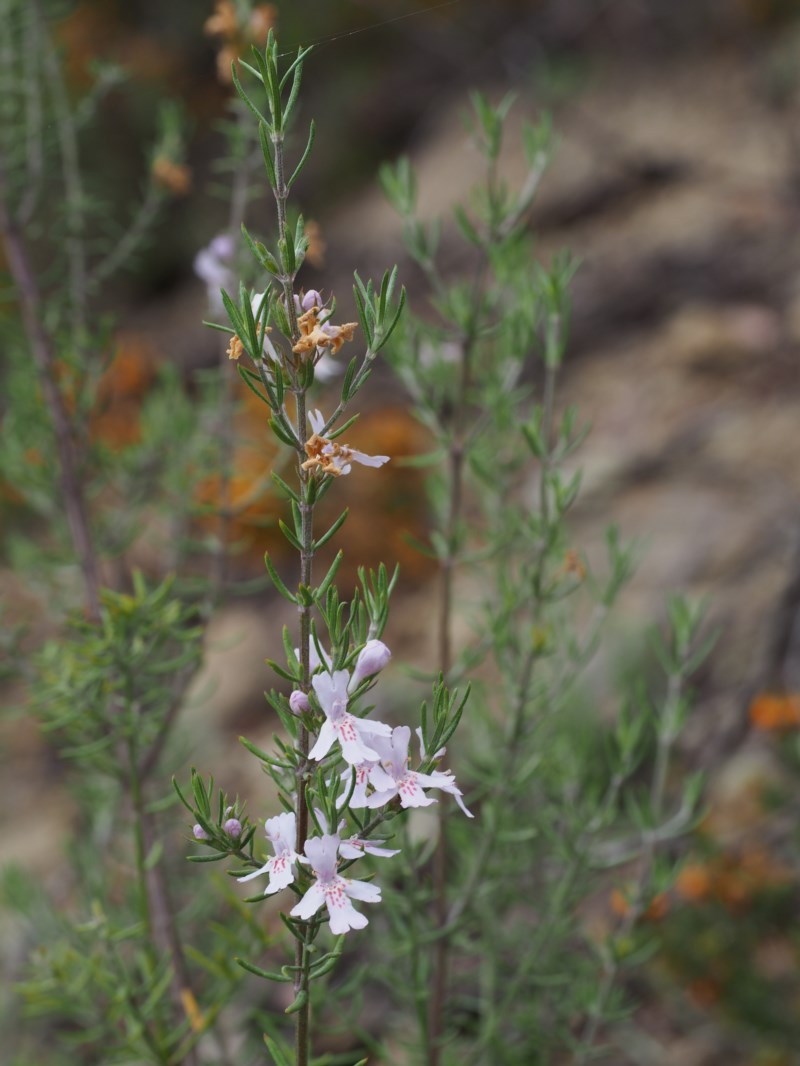
White-flowered form

Westringia eremicola, commonly known as slender westringia or slender western rosemary, is a flowering plant in the family Lamiaceae and is endemic to eastern Australia. It is a small shrub, with narrow leaves and pink, mauve to white flowers.

== Description ==
Westringia eremicola is a slender shrub growing to 1.5 m (4 ft 11 in) high. The leaves are on a petiole 0.5–0.7 mm (0.020–0.028 in) long, usually in whorls of three, narrow-elliptic to linear, mostly 8–20 mm (0.31–0.79 in) long, 0.8–1.6 mm (0.031–0.063 in) wide. The margins of the leaves are smooth, curved under, and both surfaces have more or less flattened, simple, upright hairs. The flowers are borne in leaf axils, with densely hairy sepals forming a tube 2.5–4 mm (0.098–0.157 in) long with triangular lobes 1–3 mm (0.039–0.118 in) long. The bracteoles are 0.8–2 mm (0.031–0.079 in) long and the petals are mauve, purple or occasionally white, 6.5–8.5 mm (0.26–0.33 in) long and have orange to brown spots in the throat. Flowering may occur at anytime throughout the year and the fruit is a dark brown, woody capsule up to 1.5 mm (0.059 in) long.

== Taxonomy and naming ==
Westringia eremicola was first formally described in 1834 by George Bentham from an unpublished description by Allan Cunningham and the description was published in Bentham's book Labiatarum Genera et Species. The specific epithet (eremicola) means "desert dweller".

== Distribution and habitat ==
Slender westringia grows in mallee on sandy soils in Queensland, South Australia, Victoria and New South Wales. Associated species include Calytrix tetragona, as well as Acacia, Daviesia, Leptospermum, Leucopogon and Triodia species.
