= Russula erumpens =

Scientific classification
- Domain: Eukaryota
- Kingdom: Fungi
- Division: Basidiomycota
- Class: Agaricomycetes
- Order: Russulales
- Family: Russulaceae
- Genus: Russula
- Species: R. erumpens

Binomial name
- Russula erumpens Cleland & Cheel (1919)

Species of fungus

Russula erumpens is a species of fungus in the family Russulaceae. It is found in Australia, where it occurs in eucalypt forests and woodlands.

== See also ==
- List of Russula species
