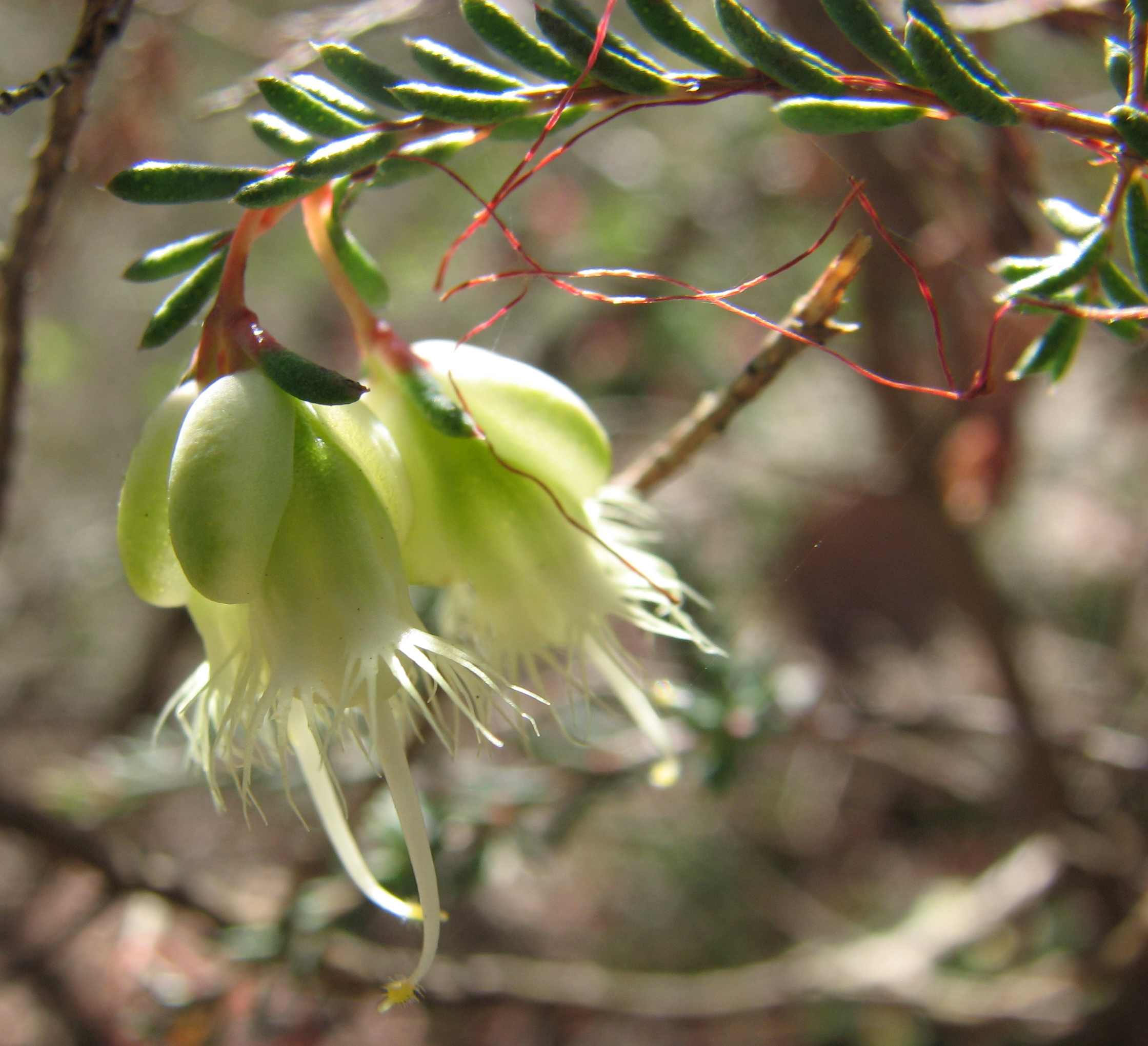
- Homoranthus darwinioides in Maranoa Gardens

Scientific classification
- Kingdom: Plantae
- Clade: Tracheophytes
- Clade: Angiosperms
- Clade: Eudicots
- Clade: Rosids
- Order: Myrtales
- Family: Myrtaceae
- Genus: Homoranthus
- Species: H. darwinioides

Binomial name
- Homoranthus darwinioides (Maiden & Betche) Cheel
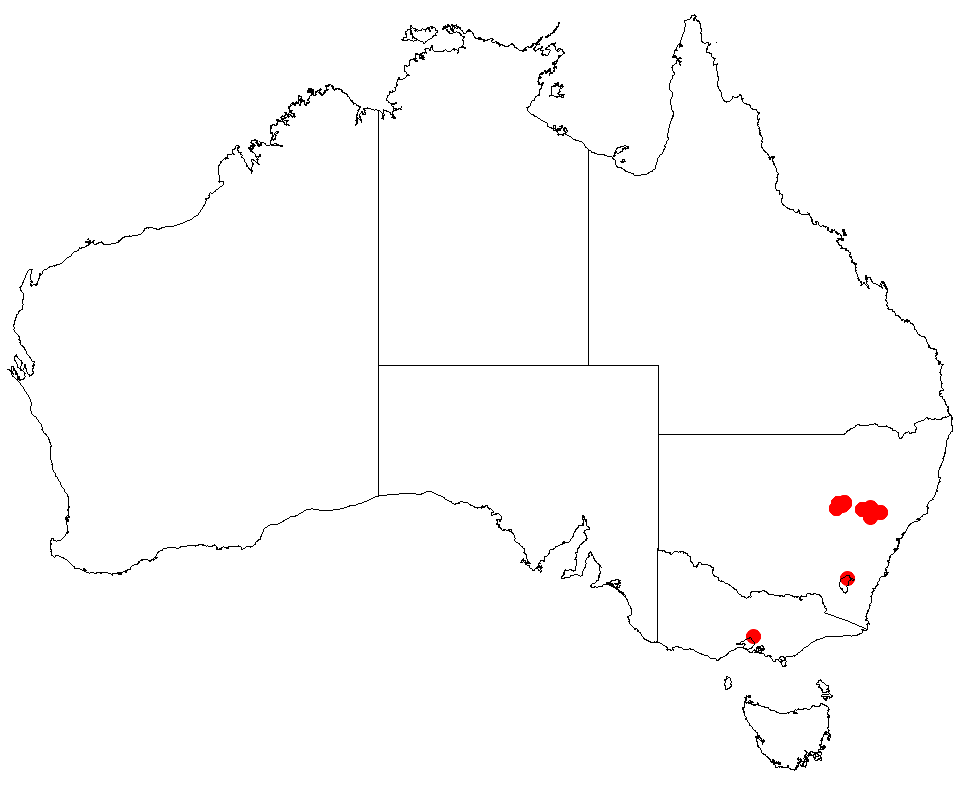
- Occurrence data from AVH

Synonyms
- Verticordia darwinioides Maiden & Betche; Rylstonea darwinioides (Maiden & Betche) R.T.Baker

= Homoranthus darwinioides =

Fairy bells

Species of flowering plant

Homoranthus darwinioides, commonly known as fairy bells, is a species of flowering plant in the family, Myrtaceae. It is a small, spreading shrub with pendulous yellow and pink flowers, grey-green leaves and is endemic to New South Wales.

== Description ==
Homoranthus darwinioides is a small, spreading shrub 1–1.5 m (3–5 ft) high, 60 cm (24 in) wide, smooth stems with a stiff upright habit. The greenish-grey leaves are arranged in opposite pairs, fleshy, needle-shaped, 3–4 mm (0.12–0.16 in) long, 1 mm (0.039 in) wide. The pendulous, conspicuous yellow and pink flowers are borne in pairs in upper leaf axils on a pedicel 1 mm (0.039 in) long. The small bracts are leaf-like, persistent during and after the flowering period, calyx tube about 1 cm (0.39 in) long with 5–7 fringed awns of equal length. The prominent style protrudes 7–8 mm (0.28–0.31 in) above the petals. Flowering occurs primarily in spring and summer, although may sporadically throughout the year.

== Taxonomy and naming ==
Homoranthus darwinioides was first formally described in 1898 by Joseph Maiden and Daniel Ludwig Ernst Betche and given the name Verticordia darwinioides and the description was published in Proceedings of the Linnean Society of New South Wales. It was transferred to the genus Homoranthus in 1922 by botanist Edwin Cheel and published in Journal and Proceedings of the Royal Society of New South Wales. The specific epithet (darwinioides) refers to the similarity to the genus Darwinia.

== Distribution and habitat ==
Fairy bells grows in shrubby woodland in deep sandy soils over sandstone. It has a scattered distribution on the western slopes and central tablelands from just north of Dubbo to west of Denman.

== Conservation status ==
Homoranthus darwinioides is a priority species under the Threatened Species Strategy and a 'keep watch' species under the NSW Government Saving our Species program. An uncommon species considered vulnerable by Briggs and Leigh(1996) and given a ROTAP conservation code of 3VCa.
