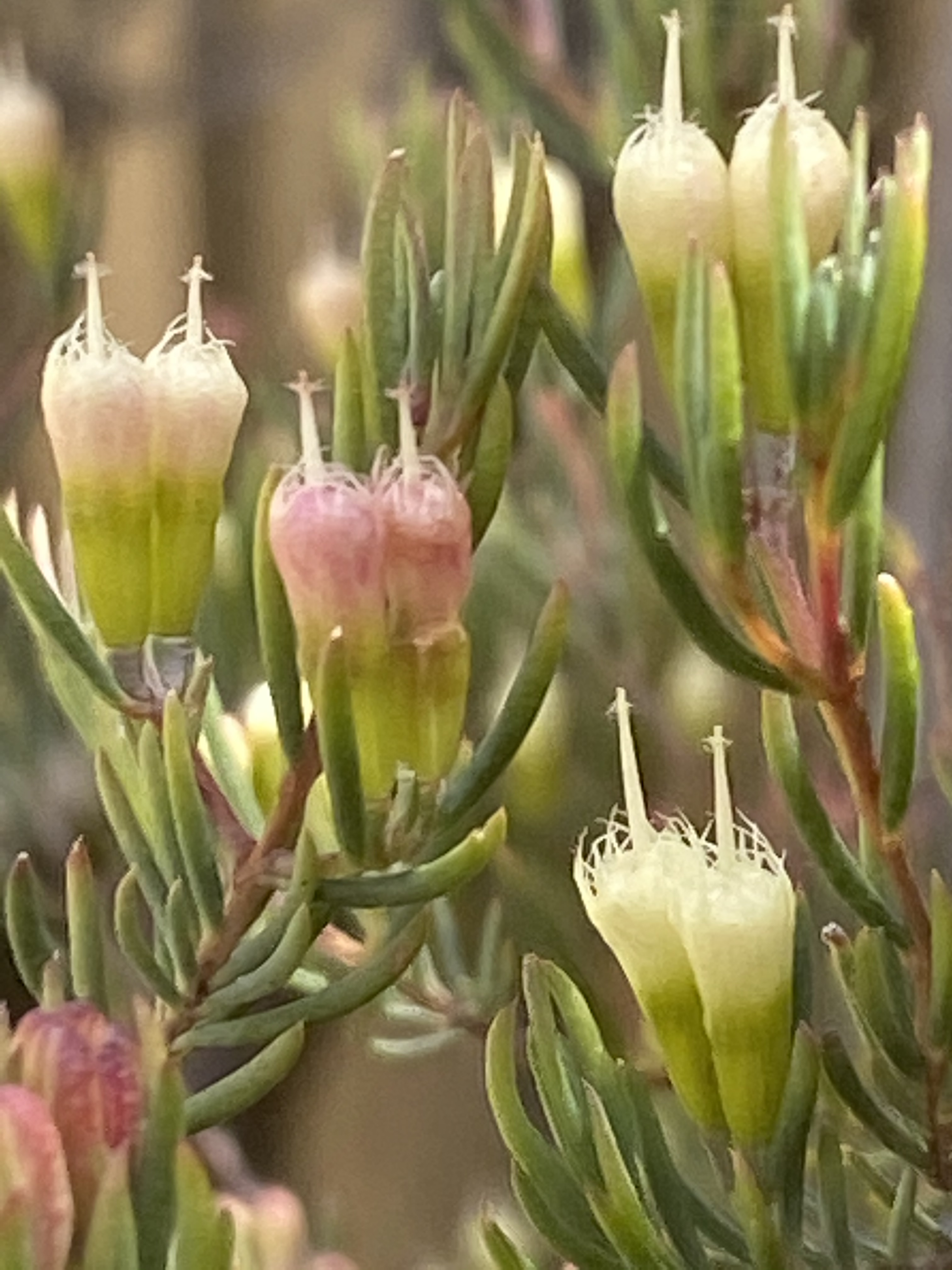

Scientific classification
- Kingdom: Plantae
- Clade: Tracheophytes
- Clade: Angiosperms
- Clade: Eudicots
- Clade: Rosids
- Order: Myrtales
- Family: Myrtaceae
- Genus: Homoranthus
- Species: H. wilhelmii

Binomial name
- Homoranthus wilhelmii (F.Muell.) Cheel
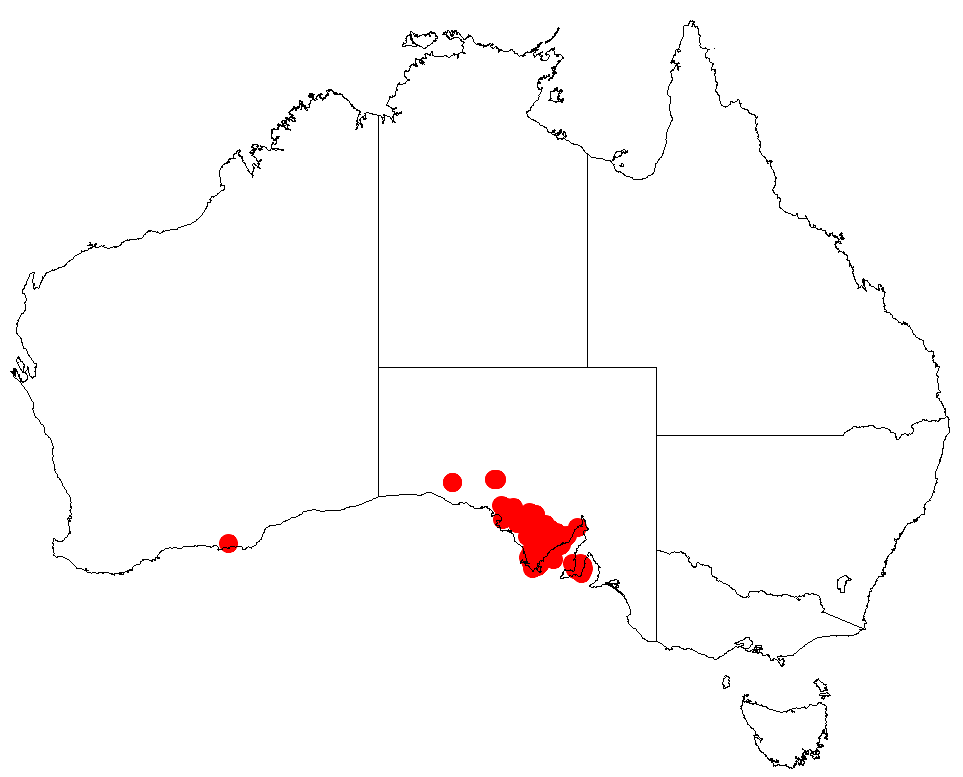
- Occurrence data from AVH

Synonyms
- Verticordia wilhelmii F.Muell.; Rylstonea wilhelmii (F.Muell.) R.T.Baker

= Homoranthus wilhelmii =

Eastern feather-flower

Species of plant

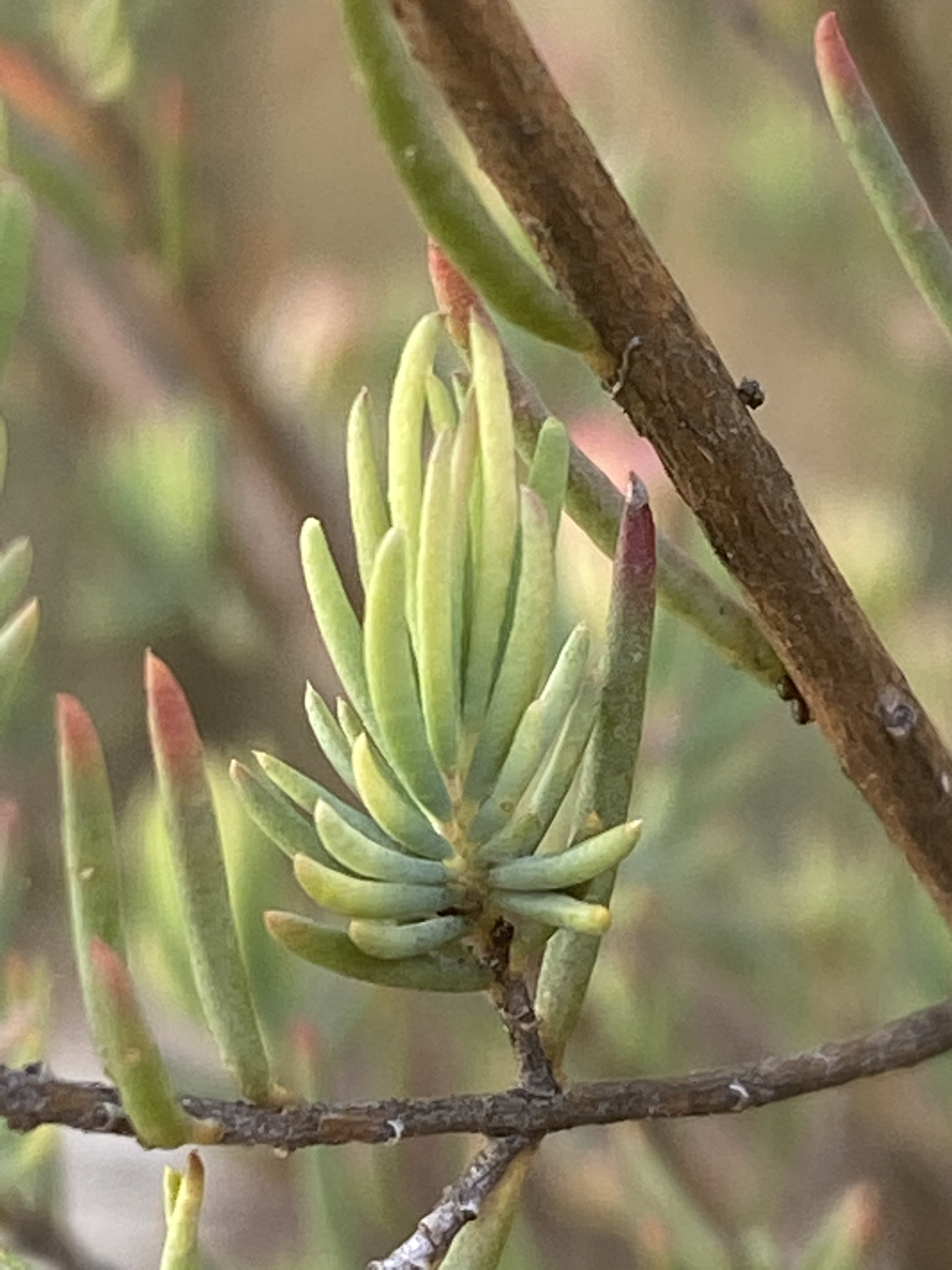
Foliage

Homoranthus wilhelmii, commonly known as the eastern feather flower, is a species of flowering plant in the family Myrtaceae and is endemic to South Australia. It is a small, spreading shrub with cylindrical to flattened leaves and white or pink flowers arranged in corymbs on the ends of branchlets. The distribution includes an area on the Yorke Peninsula, but it is most common on the southern Eyre Peninsula.

== Description ==
Homoranthus wilhelmii is a spreading shrub that grows to 0.3–1.5 m (1–5 ft) high and 0.3–0.9 m (1–3 ft) wide. The leaves are grey-green, scented, linear in shape and round to triangular in cross-section, 4–7 mm (0.2–0.3 in) long, about 1 mm (0.04 in) wide and terminate in a short, sharp point. The flowers are pink or white, slightly fragrant and arranged in a dense corymb at the ends of branches on a pedicel 2–4 mm (0.079–0.157 in) long. The floral cup is cylindrical in shape, about 3 mm (0.1 in) long with five ribs on its sides and between three and six hairs on each of the five sepal lobes. The petals are about 2 mm (0.08 in) long and the five stamens are very short, alternating with tiny staminodes. The style is about 7 mm (0.3 in) long, extends beyond the petals and has a beard near its tip. Flowering mainly occurs from September to March but the plant may flower and fruit sporadically throughout the year.

== Taxonomy and naming ==
The eastern feather-flower was first formally described by Ferdinand von Mueller, who gave it the name Verticordia wilhelmii, adding that it is an "exceedingly pretty little bush". The description was published in his book Definitions of rare or hitherto undescribed Australian plants. In 1922, Edwin Cheel changed the name to Homoranthus wilhelmii. The specific epithet (wilhelmii) commemorates Carl Wilhelmi, a collector of seeds and specimens of the region, who obtained the type specimen at Port Lincoln in November 1854.

== Distribution and habitat ==
Homoranthus wilhelmii grows in mallee shrubland between Minlaton on the Yorke Peninsula and Streaky Bay to the west of the Eyre Peninsula. It grows mostly on sandy soils in heath and woodland communities on sands and limestone ridges.

== Use in cultivation ==
The species is not well known to horticulture, although trials in its cultivation have been successful in a number of regions of Australia. H. wilhelmii has been propagated, by enthusiasts of native flora, from seed and cuttings for private gardens. The plant grows in partly shaded or sunny positions, in sandy soil or well-drained loam, and has a long flowering period. Freshly cut flowering stems have a potential application in floristry.

== Conservation status ==
Widespread, often locally common and well reserved.
