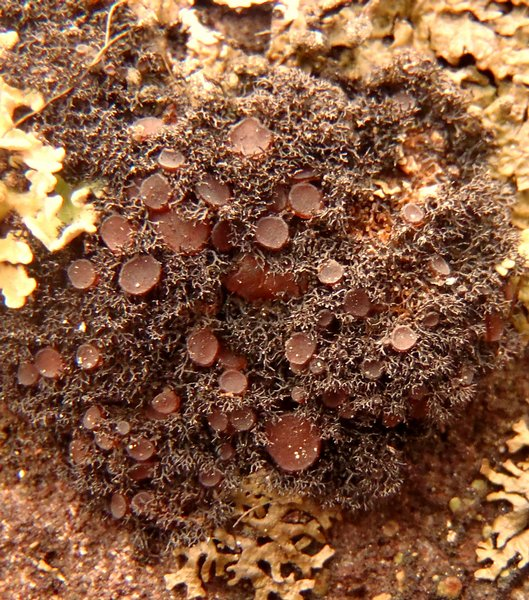
- Polychidium muscicola

Scientific classification
- Kingdom: Fungi
- Division: Ascomycota
- Class: Lecanoromycetes
- Order: Peltigerales
- Family: Massalongiaceae
- Genus: Polychidium (Ach.) Gray (1821)

Type species
- Polychidium muscicola (Sw.) Gray

Species
- P. cetrarioides P. dactylinum P. muscicola P. pulvinatum

Synonyms
- List: Collema †††††††† Polychidium Ach. (1810); Collema sect. Polychidium (Ach.) Bory (1823); Garovaglia Trevis. (1853); Pilonema Nyl. (1858); Garovaglina Trevis. (1880); Leptodendriscum Vain. (1890); Pseudoleptogium Jatta (1900); Wilsonia Cheel & Dughi (1944); Leptogidiomyces Cif. & Tomas. (1953); Colleptogium sect. Polychidiopsis M.Choisy (1962)

= Polychidium =

Genus of lichen-forming fungi

Polychidium is a genus of lichen-forming fungi in the family Massalongiaceae. These lichens form tiny, shrub-like tufts with branching filaments that create woolly cushions on moss-covered rocks and tree twigs. The genus was traditionally thought to include four similar-looking species, but molecular studies revealed that three of these actually belong to a different genus called Leptogidium. Today, Polychidium in the strict sense contains only P. muscicola and three closely related species, found from tropical to subarctic regions worldwide.

== Taxonomy ==
Polychidium has historically been regarded as a single genus that unites four morphologically similar cyanolichen species, one ground-dwelling taxon containing Nostoc and three epiphytes housing Scytonema. The modern concept of the genus was framed by Aino Henssen in 1963, who placed these species together because of their distinctive dendroid ("woolly-bear") thallus and hemiangiocarpic apothecia, explicitly down-playing differences in photobiont choice.

Molecular studies have since overturned that pragmatic morphology-based arrangement. A multilocus phylogeny demonstrated that the terricolous P. muscicola nests in the family Massalongiaceae (suborder Peltigerineae), whereas the three Scytonema-bearing epiphytes (P. contortum, P. dendriscum and P. stipitatum) form a well-supported clade inside the Pannariaceae (suborder Collematineae). Because that clade is not in the same genus as P. muscicola, it was resurrected under its oldest available name, Leptogidium.

These results show that the genus as traditionally circumscribed is polyphyletic and that its dendroid body plan evolved at least twice, an example of convergent evolution in the Peltigerales. Following these molecular findings, Polychidium in the strict sense is now restricted to the Massalongiaceae and includes P. muscicola and three closely related species, while the former epiphytic species have been transferred to Leptogidium within Pannariaceae.

== Description ==
Polychidium forms minute, shrub-like tufts made of slender filaments that branch almost dichotomously and weave into domed or straggling cushions. Each filament is round in cross-section and wrapped in a distinct cortex one to several cells thick, enclosing a central bundle of hyphae with rounded walls. The lichen's photosynthetic partner is the cyanobacterium Nostoc, which gives the thallus its ability to fix atmospheric nitrogen. Each "woolly‑bear" tuft is engineered like a tiny brush: stout fungal hyphae run perpendicular to the branch axis, creating a stable core in which chains of Nostoc lie twisted or straight. The filament is wrapped in a distinctive brick‑work cortex of rounded fungal cells, contrasting with the interlocking‑puzzle cortex seen in the related genus Leptogidium.

The sexual fruiting bodies are mainly lateral apothecia whose brown discs sit slightly sunken below a low rim. No true thalline margin surrounds them, but a proper exciple of fungal tissue is present. Threads called paraphyses run through the hymenium; they are unbranched, segmented by cross-walls, and carry tiny swollen tips (capitate apices). Asci are broadly cylindrical, eight-spored and display a blue reaction (K/I+) in their thickened apices. The ascospores are one- or two-celled, colourless, ellipsoidal to spindle-shaped, and may have either thin or relatively thick walls.

Asexual reproduction occurs in small, brown pycnidia that also develop on the sides of the filaments. These structures contain short conidiogenous cells that bud off rod-shaped (bacilliform) conidia. Thin-layer chromatography has revealed no secondary metabolites (lichen products) in the genus.

== Habitat and distribution ==
The genus Polychidium has been documented from tropical through to subarctic regions. These lichens inhabit moss-covered rocks and grow on small twigs of trees.

== Species ==
- Polychidium cetrarioides Anzi (1860)
- Polychidium dactylinum Trevis. (1880)
- Polychidium muscicola (Sw.) Gray (1821)
- Polychidium pulvinatum (Eitner) R.Sant. (1993)
