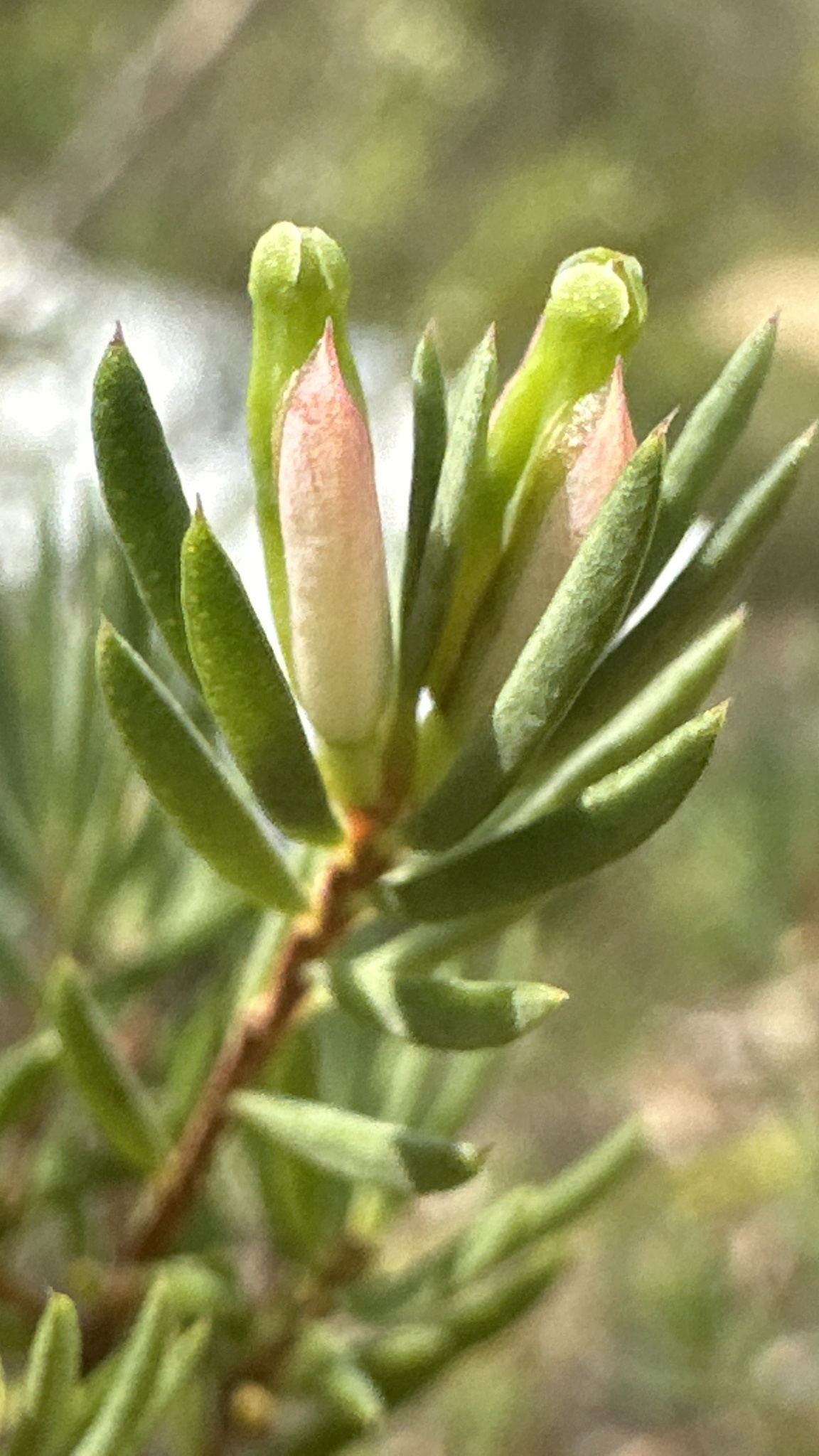

Conservation status
- Vulnerable (EPBC Act)

Scientific classification
- Kingdom: Plantae
- Clade: Embryophytes
- Clade: Tracheophytes
- Clade: Spermatophytes
- Clade: Angiosperms
- Clade: Eudicots
- Clade: Rosids
- Order: Myrtales
- Family: Myrtaceae
- Genus: Darwinia
- Species: D. biflora

Binomial name
- Darwinia biflora (Cheel) B.G.Briggs
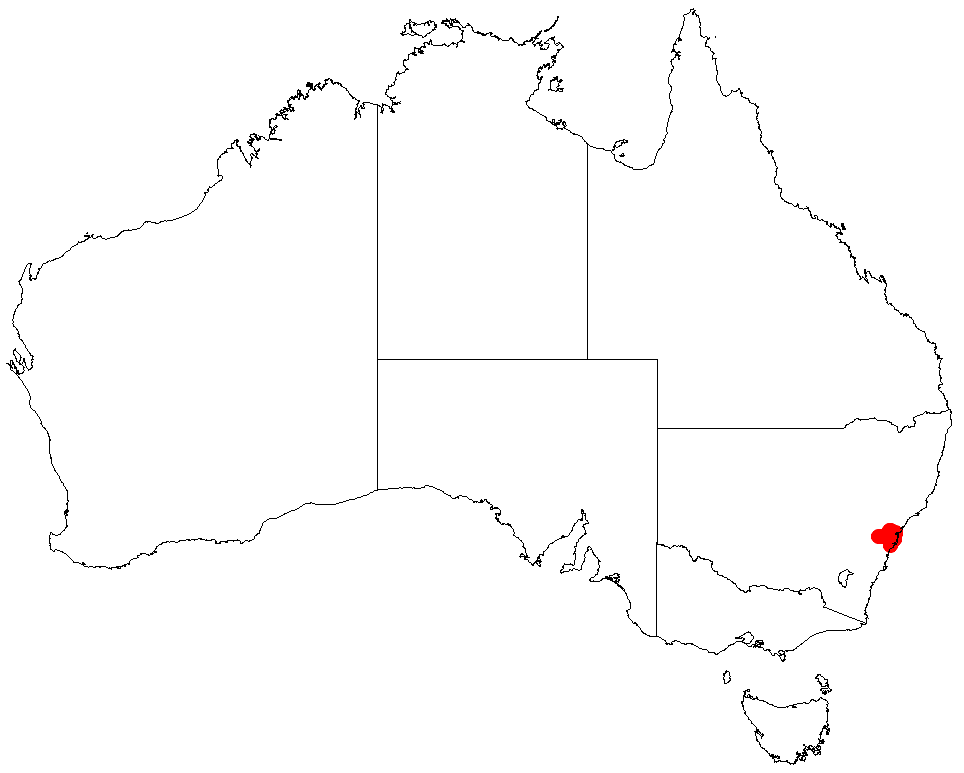
- Occurrence data from AVH

Synonyms
- Darwinia taxifolia var. biflora Cheel

= Darwinia biflora =

Species of flowering plant

Darwinia biflora is a plant in the myrtle family Myrtaceae and is endemic to New South Wales. It is an erect, often straggly shrub with flattened, glabrous leaves, and flowers which are arranged in pairs. The flowers are greenish in colour but each is surrounded by two purple-red bracteoles and have a long yellow-green style projecting out of the flower tube. The species only occurs in the Sydney region in a few places where shale-capped ridges intergrade with Hawkesbury sandstone.

== Description ==
Darwinia biflora is an erect, sometimes spreading, often straggly shrub which grows to a height of 0.2–0.8 metres (0.7–3 ft). The leaves are glabrous and arranged in a decussate pattern along the branches. The leaves are 6–10 millimetres (0.2–0.4 in) long, flattened and often pressed against the branches.

The flowers are arranged on stalks less than 1 millimetre (0.04 in) long near the ends of the branches, usually in pairs. When they open, the flowers are tubular in shape, white to pink in the upper parts and green in the floral tube. The flower tube is 5–8 millimetres (0.2–0.3 in) long and is surrounded by leaf-like bracts 1–8 millimetres (0.04–0.3 in) long and two purple-red bracteoles 5–8 millimetres (0.2–0.3 in) long which fall off after the flower has opened. Stamens and staminodes are enclosed within the flower tube but the style is 10–14 millimetres (0.4–0.6 in) long, yellow-green or red, straight or slightly curved and projects out of the tube. Flowering occurs throughout the year but mainly between May and August and is followed by the fruit which is a nut about 1–1.5 millimetres (0.04–0.06 in) in diameter.

== Taxonomy ==
The first formal description was by Edwin Cheel who gave the plant the name Darwinia taxifolia var. biflora. The description was published in 1922 in Journal and Proceedings of the Royal Society of New South Wales. In 1962, Barbara Briggs raised it to species status and published the change in Contributions from the New South Wales National Herbarium.

The specific epithet (biflora) is derived from the Latin prefix bi- meaning "two" and the Latin word flos meaning "flower".

== Distribution and habitat ==
Although there are herbarium specimens of this species from further afield, all the present populations occur in the urban areas of Sydney between Maroota and North Ryde. It grows in heath on sandstone ridge tops or in woodland where the sandstone intergrades with shale. Ninety of the 240 known sites where the species occurs are in national parks or other reserves but the remainder are in habitats often favoured for residential development.

== Ecology ==
Individual plants of Darwinia biflora are thought to live for 15 to 20 years. The plants usually self-pollinate and insects have rarely been observed visiting the flowers. Seed is usually not produced until the plants are about 5 years old but the viability of seed is high and although fire kills the plant, many new seedlings appear after fire.

== Conservation ==
Darwinia biflora is listed as a vulnerable species in New South Wales and in terms of the Australian Government Environment Protection and Biodiversity Conservation Act 1999.
