= Massalongia griseolobulata =

Scientific classification
- Kingdom: Fungi
- Division: Ascomycota
- Class: Lecanoromycetes
- Order: Peltigerales
- Family: Massalongiaceae
- Genus: Massalongia
- Species: M. griseolobulata

Binomial name
- Massalongia griseolobulata Øvstedal (2010)

Species of lichen

Massalongia griseolobulata is a species of lichen in the family Massalongiaceae. Found in the Tristan da Cunha–Gough Island, it was described as a new species in 2010 by Norwegian lichenologist Dag Øvstedal. The type specimen was collected from the lower slopes of Tafelkop on Gough Island). Here it was found growing on the trunk of a treefern (Lomariocycas palmiformis) at an altitude of 270 m (890 ft). The species is known only from the type locality.

The lichen has a pale grey to ochre, squamulose (scaley) thallus covering an area of 2–3 cm (0.8–1.2 in). Its ascospores, which number eight per ascus, are 6–7-septate and measure 25–30 by 7–11 μm. No secondary chemicals were detected using thin-layer chromatography.
