= Leptogidium =

Scientific classification
- Domain: Eukaryota
- Kingdom: Fungi
- Division: Ascomycota
- Class: Lecanoromycetes
- Order: Peltigerales
- Family: Pannariaceae
- Genus: Leptogidium; Nyl. (1873)

Type species
- Leptogidium dendriscum (Nyl.) Nyl. (1873)

Species
- L. byssoides L. contortum L. dendriscum L. intricatulum L. neocaledonicum L. stipitatum

Genus of lichens

Leptogidium is a genus of lichen-forming fungi in the family Pannariaceae. It has six species.

== Taxonomy ==
The genus was circumscribed by the Finnish lichenologist William Nylander in 1873. It was originally classified within the broader genus Polychidium. However, molecular phylogenetic studies conducted in 2011 revealed that Leptogidium is a distinct genus, separate from Polychidium. Leptogidium belongs to the family Pannariaceae within the suborder Collematineae of the order Peltigerales. Phylogenetic analysis has shown that Leptogidium is sister to the genus Degelia, specifically to Degelia gayana.

== Description ==
Leptogidium is characterised by a distinctive thallus (lichen body) architecture and microscopic features. The thallus of Leptogidium species is radially symmetric and dendroid (tree-like) in structure, consisting of highly ramified, grey to dark brown branches. These branches are cylindrical (terete) and frequently divided, giving the lichen a minutely shrub-like or thread-like appearance. The thallus colour ranges from blue-grey to brown. This three-dimensional form is similar to that of Polychidium, though it has evolved independently.

Microscopically, Leptogidium exhibits a distinctive arrangement of fungal cells around the photobiont (the photosynthetic partner in the lichen symbiosis). The fungal cells form a brickwork mosaic that envelops the cyanobacterial filaments, with the fungal cells shaped like interlocking puzzle pieces. This distinguishes Leptogidium from the related genus Polychidium, where the cells are roundish. The outer layer (cortex) of the thallus is composed of tightly packed, angular fungal cells, forming a protective tissue called pseudoparenchyma.

Leptogidium species reproduce sexually through apothecia (disc-shaped fruiting bodies). The development of these fruiting bodies follows a hemiangiocarpic pattern, where the apothecia mature within thalline buds before emerging. When mature, the apothecia become exposed on the surface or slightly raised, appearing orange to red-brown in colour. They lack a thalline margin (an rim of tissue containing the lichen's photobiont) but possess a true exciple (an inner rim of fungal tissue). The photobiont associated with Leptogidium is the cyanobacterium Scytonema.

Inside the apothecia, Leptogidium produces spore-bearing sacs (asci), each containing eight colourless, ellipsoidal spores without internal divisions (septa). The asci are interspersed with sterile filaments called paraphyses, which have swollen tips. The genus also produces asexual reproductive structures (pycnidia), which are small, brown, and located on the sides of the branches. These produce tiny, rod-shaped reproductive cells called conidia.

Chemical analysis has not detected any lichen-specific substances in Leptogidium.

== Species ==
- Leptogidium byssoides (Carrington) Zahlbr. (1924)
- Leptogidium contortum (Henssen) T.Sprib. & Muggia (2011)
- Leptogidium dendriscum (Nyl.) Nyl. (1873)
- Leptogidium intricatulum (Nyl.) Nyl. (1890)
- Leptogidium neocaledonicum (Vain.) Zahlbr. (1924)
- Leptogidium stipitatum (Vězda & W.A.Weber) T.Sprib. & Muggia (2011)
