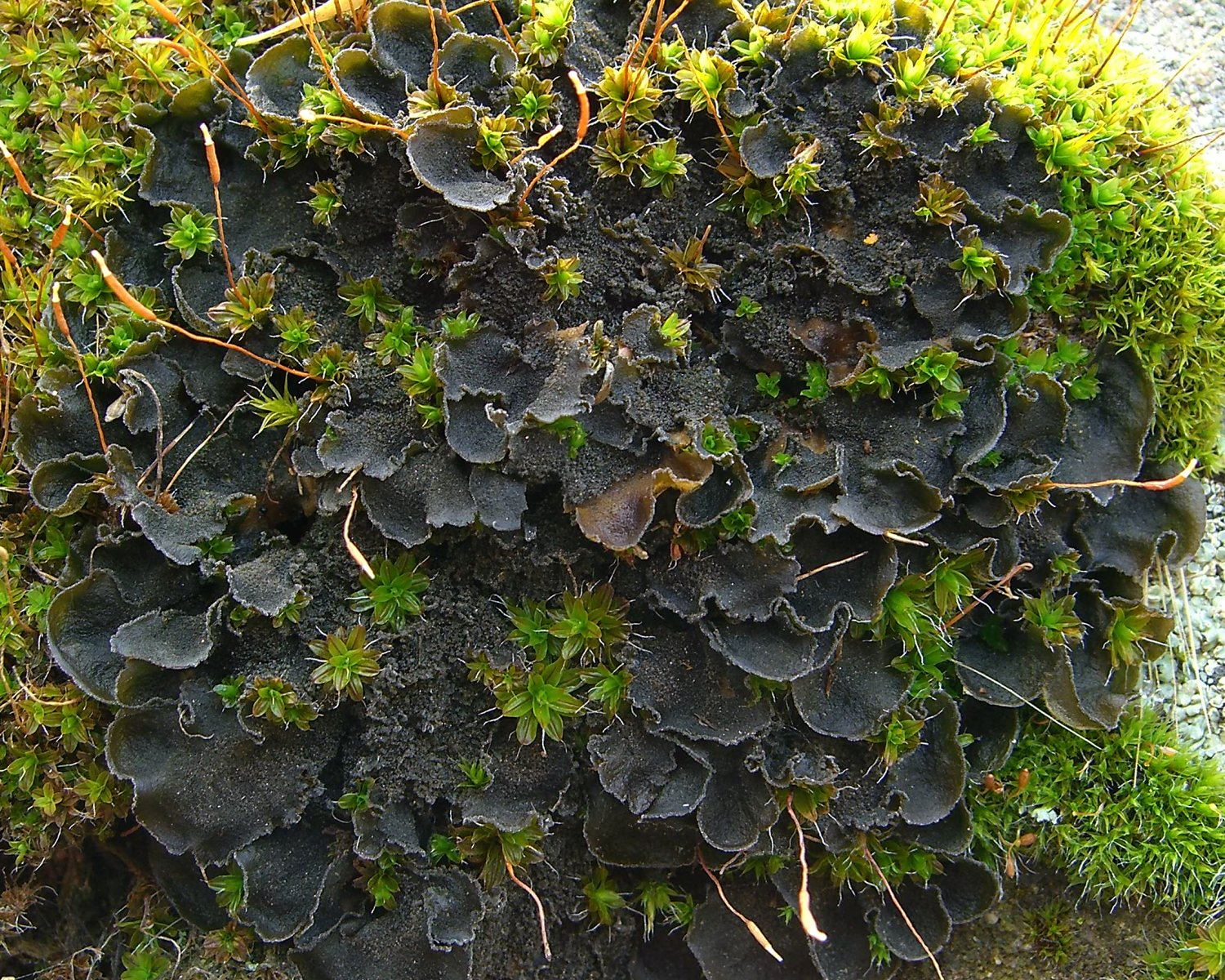
- Leptochidium albociliatum

Scientific classification
- Domain: Eukaryota
- Kingdom: Fungi
- Division: Ascomycota
- Class: Lecanoromycetes
- Order: Peltigerales
- Family: Massalongiaceae
- Genus: Leptochidium; M.Choisy (1952)

Type species
- Leptochidium albociliatum (Desm.) M.Choisy (1952)

Species
- L. albociliatum L. crenatulum

= Leptochidium =

Genus of lichens

Leptochidium is a genus of lichen-forming fungi in the family Massalongiaceae. It has two species:

- Leptochidium albociliatum (Desm.) M.Choisy (1952)
- Leptochidium crenatulum (Nyl.) P.M.Jørg. (2006)

The genus was circumscribed by French lichenologist Maurice Choisy in 1952. Leptochidium remained monotypic until 2006, when Per Magnus Jørgensen transferred into it a species originally named Leptogium rivulare var. crenatulum by William Nylander.
