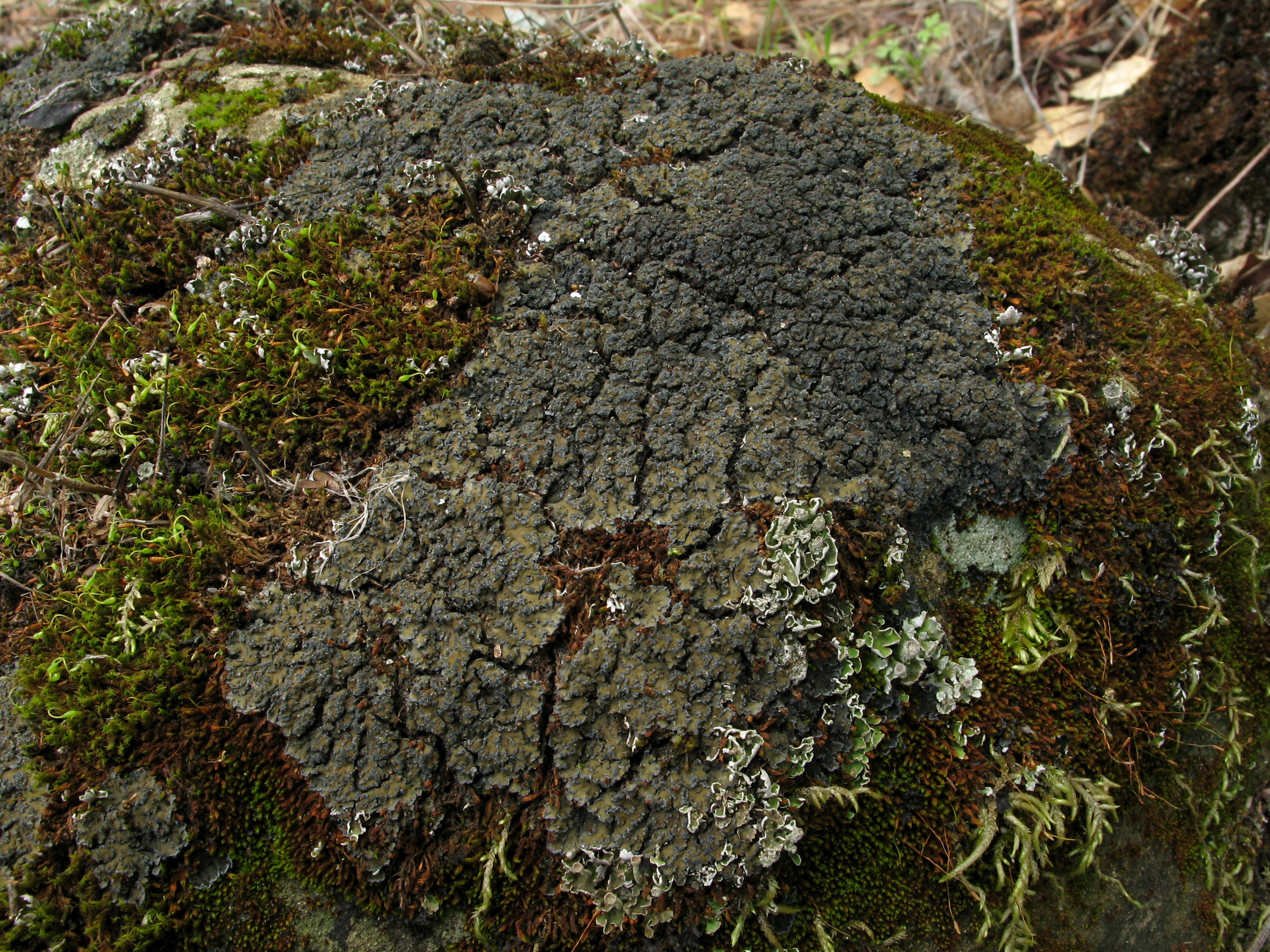

Scientific classification
- Kingdom: Fungi
- Division: Ascomycota
- Class: Lecanoromycetes
- Order: Peltigerales
- Family: Massalongiaceae
- Genus: Massalongia
- Species: M. carnosa

Binomial name
- Massalongia carnosa (Dicks.) Körb. (1855)

= Massalongia carnosa =

Species of lichen

Massalongia carnosa is a species of lichen in the family Massalongiaceae. It is a foliose lichen which grows on mosses. It is found widely in Iceland.

No secondary chemicals are known from the species.
