= Abramo Bartolommeo Massalongo =

Italian paleobotanist and lichenologist

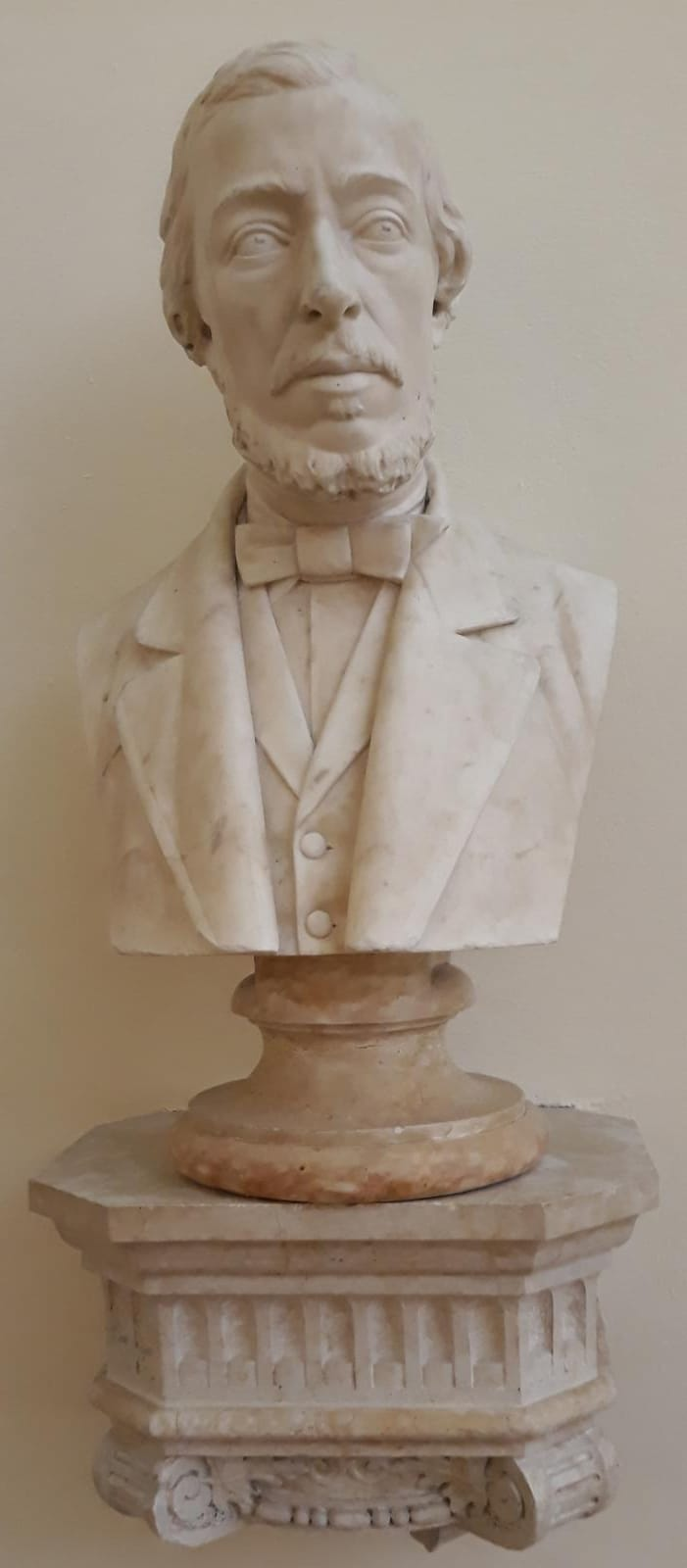
Bust of Abramo Massalongo

Abramo Bartolommeo Massalongo (13 May 1824 – 25 May 1860) was an Italian paleobotanist and lichenologist. He was born in Tregnago in the Province of Verona and took a great interest in botany as a young man. Massalongo joined the faculty of medicine at the University of Padua in 1844 and transferred to law, completing his studies in 1849. Along with Gustav Wilhelm Körber, he founded the "Italian-Silesian" school of lichenology. He also collaborated with Martino Anzi. He was the husband of Maria Colognato and the father of hepaticologist Caro Benigno Massalongo. He also worked in the scientific field of herpetology. Massalongo edited the exsiccata Lichenes Italici Exsiccati (1855–1856) and described 138 new lichen genera and several new lichen species. In 1859 his Catalogo dei rettili delle province venete was published in Venice.

Massalongo died in Verona in 1860.

He was honoured in 1855, when German lichenologist Gustav Wilhelm Körber circumscribed Massalongia which is a genus of lichen-forming fungi in the family Massalongiaceae.

== Collections and legacy ==
A 2026 study documented a historic lichen collection by Massalongo preserved at the Natural History Museum of Venice "Giancarlo Ligabue". It comprises 594 exsiccata representing 490 infraspecific taxa (i.e. forms, varieties, and subspecies), most of them collected in north-eastern Italy between 1845 and 1856. The material was donated by Massalongo to the Istituto Veneto di Scienze, Lettere ed Arti in at least two batches, as shown by a letter dated 22 January 1856, and that it later entered the Venice museum in 1923. Alongside a complete copy of his Lichenes Italici Exsiccati in its original form, the museum also preserves a previously unpublished lichen collection associated with him.

The Venice material is arranged in four issues containing 231 loose herbarium sheets, with specimens ordered alphabetically by genus and separated by substrate. Many sheets retain Massalongo's handwritten names and annotations directly on the paper or on specimen envelopes rather than on separate labels. In the 2020s the collection was digitized using an image-to-data-to-web workflow in which each specimen was photographed in panoramic view and with one or more detail images, and the resulting data were standardised to Darwin Core and published online. The collection preserves a substantial record of Massalongo's field activity in the Veneto and neighbouring parts of north-eastern Italy, especially the area north-east of Verona near his home village of Tregnago.

== See also ==
- Category talk:Taxa named by Abramo Bartolommeo Massalongo
