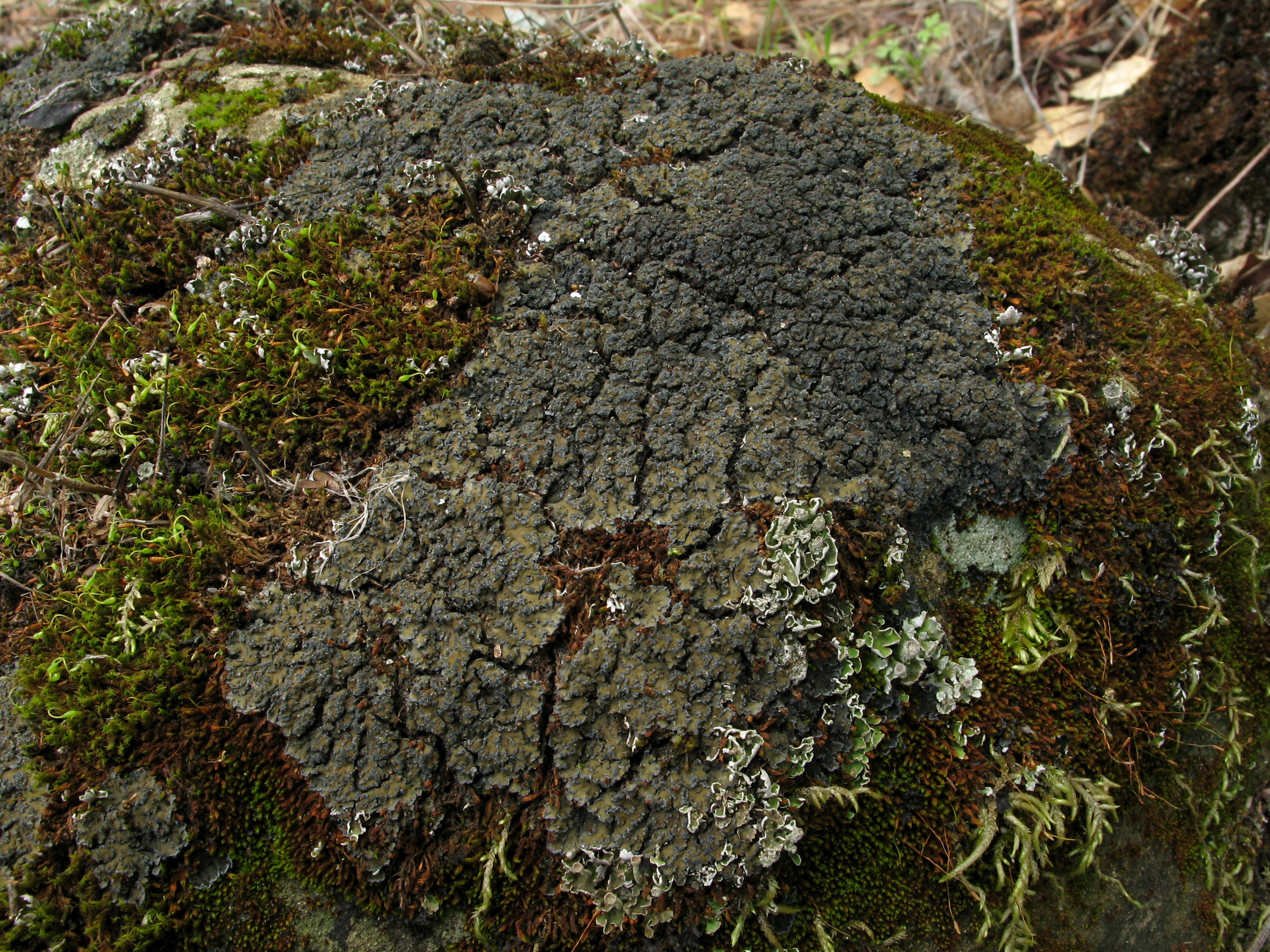
- Massalongia carnosa in California, USA

Scientific classification
- Kingdom: Fungi
- Division: Ascomycota
- Class: Lecanoromycetes
- Order: Peltigerales
- Family: Massalongiaceae; Wedin, P.M.Jørg. & E.Wiklund (2007)

Type genus
- Massalongia Körb. (1855)

Genera
- Leptochidium; Massalongia; Polychidium

= Massalongiaceae =

Genus of lichens

Massalongiaceae is a small family of lichen-forming fungi in the order Peltigerales. It has three genera and seven species.

Species in this family have cyanobacteria as their primary symbiotic partner (cyanobiont), so they belong to the group known as "cyanobacterial lichens".

== Taxonomy ==
The family was circumscribed by Mats Wedin, Per Magnus Jørgensen, and Elisabeth Wiklund in 2007. Molecular phylogenetic analysis showed that the three genera formed a well-supported monophyletic group that was distinct from other similar families in the Peltigerales. The family was named after the type genus, Massalongia; the genus name honours Italian lichenologist Abramo Bartolommeo Massalongo (1824-1860).

Massalongiaceae has a sister taxon relationship with the family Peltigeraceae, and these two families together form a clade that is sister to a clade containing the families Vahiellaceae and Koerberiaceae. Previous phylogenetic studies had placed genus Massalongia in a group together with Peltigeraceae, Nephromataceae and Lobariaceae, although the relationships of Massalongia within this group were not precisely determined.

== Description ==
The thalli of Massalongiaceae lichens range in form from squamulose (scaley) to microfoliose (tiny and leafy) or microfruticose (tiny and bushy). The photobiont partner is a member of the cyanobacterial genus Nostoc. In the squamulose to microfoliose species, the lobes are rounded to elongated, and the branches in microfruticose species are terete (more or less circular in cross-section) and delicate. The ascomata are in the form of apothecia, and they are usually biatorine (where the outer layers of the apothecium are light-coloured and contain no algae). The hamathecium (a collective term for all kinds of hyphae or other tissues between asci) consists of unbranched to branched paraphyses, and is amyloid.

The asci are semifissitunicate (i.e., discharge of spores from the ascus involves the separation of wall layers), with a thin apical tholus (the thickened inner part of an ascus tip) with an amyloid ring-structure, and cylindrical. The structure of the asci is particularly important in distinguishing between related families in the Peltigerales. For example, Peltigeraceae has a distinctive apical tube, while Nephromataceae lacks any amyloid apical structure, and Lobariaceae has an indistinctive amyloid layer that is not comparable to the apical cap found in the asci of the Massalongiaceae.

There are eight ascospores in each ascus. The spores have septa that divide the spore transversely, and have a shape ranging from spindle-shaped (fusiform) to ellipsoid. The conidiomata are in the form of pycnidia; the conidia are hyaline, lack septa, and are rod-shaped to spindle-shaped. No secondary compounds are known to occur in the family.

== Habitat and distribution ==
Massalongiaceae lichens grow on rocks, and are often associated with bryophytes, growing among or on top of them. Collectively, the family has a cosmopolitan distribution, but with more representation in northern temperate zones.

== Genera and species ==
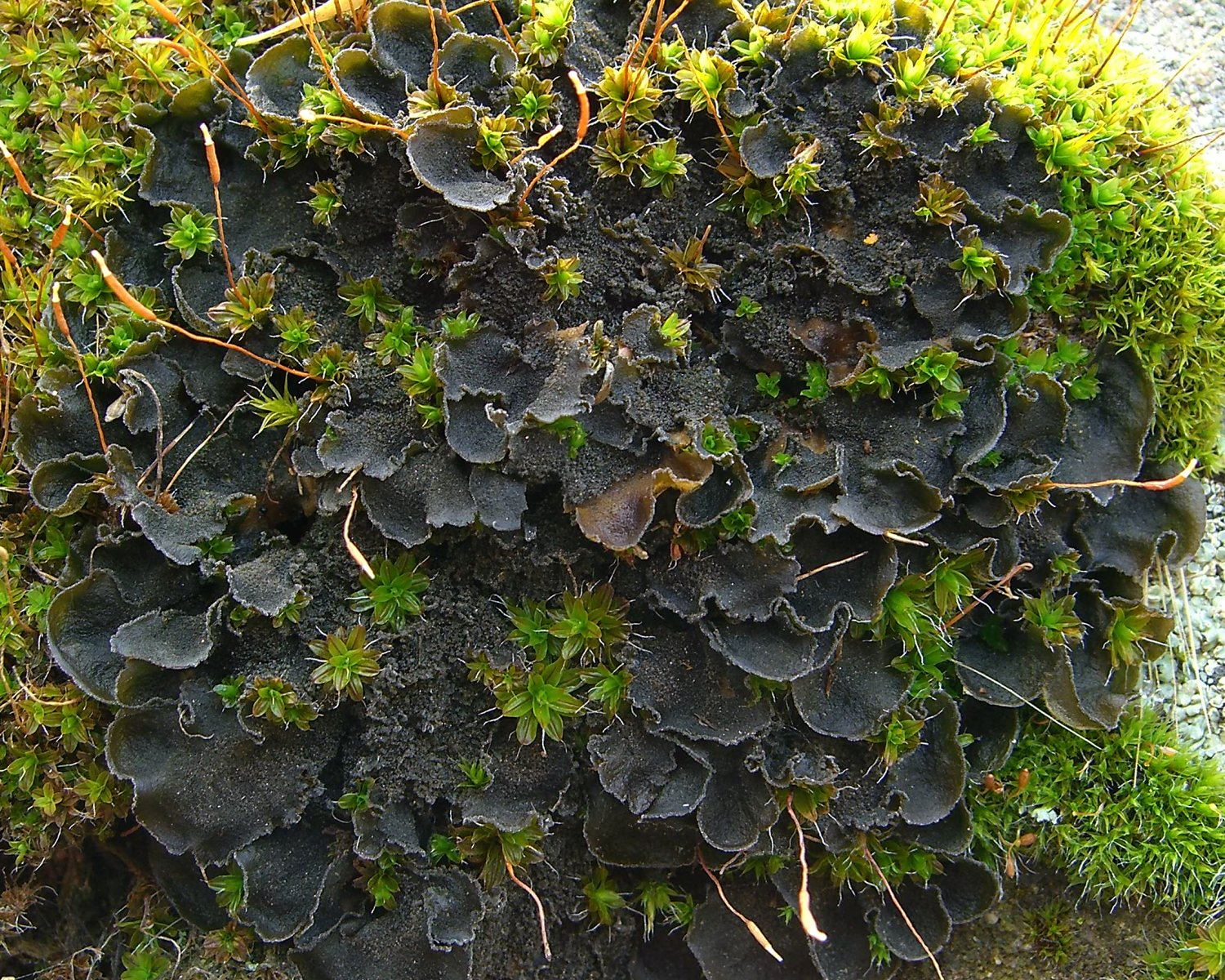
Leptochidium albociliatum

- Leptochidium M.Choisy (1952)

- L. albociliatum
- L. crenatulum

- Massalongia Körb. (1855)

- M. carnosa
- M. griseolobulata
- M. microphylliza
- M. patagonica

- Polychidium (Ach.) Gray (1821)

- P. muscicola

Several additional species of Massalongia have been described, but some cannot be identified precisely due to lack of sufficient type material, as they are only known from the type collection, and some have been transferred to other genera.
