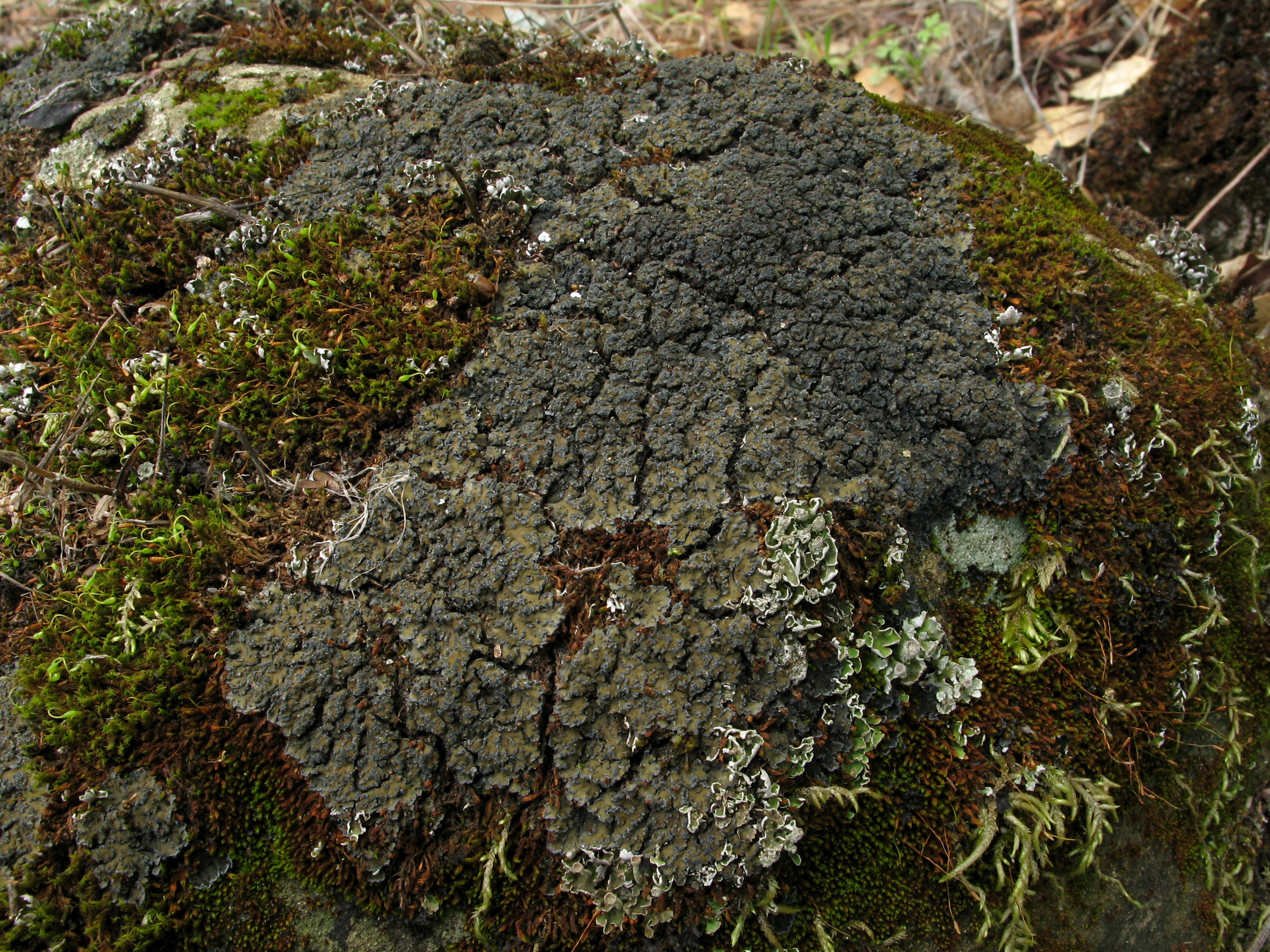
- Massalongia carnosa

Scientific classification
- Kingdom: Fungi
- Division: Ascomycota
- Class: Lecanoromycetes
- Order: Peltigerales
- Family: Massalongiaceae
- Genus: Massalongia; Körb. (1855)

Type species
- Massalongia carnosa (Dicks.) Körb. (1855)

Species
- M. carnosa M. griseolobulata M. microphylliza M. patagonica

Synonyms
- Massalongomyces Cif. & Tomas. (1953)

= Massalongia (fungus) =

Genus of lichen-forming fungi

Massalongia is a genus of lichen-forming fungi in the family Massalongiaceae. It has four species. These lichens form small, leaf-like patches with narrow lobes that often arrange in loose rosettes and produce tiny finger-like projections for vegetative reproduction. They partner with nitrogen-fixing cyanobacteria and are found growing on various surfaces in different climatic regions. The genus was established in 1855 by the German lichenologist Gustav Wilhelm Körber, who named it in honour of the Italian lichenologist Abramo Bartolommeo Massalongo.

== Taxonomy ==
The genus was circumscribed by the German lichenologist Gustav Wilhelm Körber in 1855, with M. carnosa assigned as the type species. In his original description, Körber distinguished Massalongia by its distinctive fruiting bodies (apothecia) that appear almost biatorine in form, with a proper exciple composed of fleshy tissue on the interior and a cortical layer on the exterior. He noted that the hymenium lacks the blue-black colouration typical of many related genera, instead showing a simple, thick structure with a cortical layer. The thallus was described as foliose (leafy) to squamulose (scaly), often forming crusted, compact growths with a black prothallus. Körber named the genus in honour of Professor Massalongo in Verona, recognising his contributions to lichenology. The type species M. carnosa was noted for its membranous, leaf-like thallus with densely crowded, elongated segments that have crenate margins, and its somewhat elevated apothecia with thin, pale margins.

== Description ==
Massalongia forms a small, leaf‑like (foliose) thallus whose narrow lobes can be scale‑like or slightly elongated and often arrange themselves into loose rosettes. Along their margins the lobes sprout tiny, finger‑like isidia or minute secondary lobes (folioles) that help the lichen spread, but they never produce powdery soredia. The upper surface is covered by a brick‑work cortex of compact fungal cells, while the lower surface lacks a true cortex and instead shows a mat of densely intertwined hyphae running lengthwise. A loose medulla of hyphae fills the interior. The photosynthetic partner is from the cyanobacterium genus Nostoc, which enables the lichen to fix atmospheric nitrogen.

The sexual fruiting bodies (apothecia) develop either on the surface of a lobe (laminal) or right at its edge. Each has a distinct wall (exciple) and a disc whose upper half is reddish brown and does not react to potassium hydroxide solution (K–), whereas the lower half is colourless but turns blue with iodine stain (I+). Slender, unbranched paraphyses stand packed together in the disc; they are divided by cross‑walls and terminate in slightly swollen, brownish tips.

Asci are cylindrical, contain eight spores, and belong to the Fuscidea structural type. Their apical cap stains deep blue in the combined potassium–iodide test (K/I+), but they lack the darker amyloid plug seen in many lichens. The spores are colourless, ellipsoidal to somewhat spindle‑shaped, divided by one (occasionally up to three) septa, sometimes pinched where the walls meet, and taper gently at one or both ends. Asexual reproduction takes place in brown, flask‑shaped pycnidia that produce rod‑shaped or slightly dumb‑bell‑shaped conidia. Thin-layer chromatography has so far failed to detect any characteristic secondary metabolites in the genus.

== Species ==
As of July 2025, Species Fungorum (in the Catalogue of Life) accept four species of Massalongia:

- Massalongia carnosa (Dicks.) Körb. (1855)
- Massalongia griseolobulata Øvstedal (2010)
- Massalongia microphylliza (Nyl.) Henssen (1963)
- Massalongia patagonica Kitaura & A.P.Lorenz (2018)
