= Edwin Cheel =

Australian botanist (1872–1951)

- Born: 14 January 1872; Chartham, Kent, England
- Died: 19 September 1951 (aged 79); Sydney, NSW, Australia
- Known for: Botanical collector
- Scientific career
- Fields: botany
- Author abbrev. (botany): Cheel

Edwin Cheel (14 February 1872 – 19 September 1951) was an Australian botanist and collector.

Before being appointed as a staff member of Centennial Park in 1897 he was a gardener in New South Wales and Queensland. Later he transferred to the Royal Botanic Gardens, Sydney. In 1908 he joined the National Herbarium, and was appointed Chief Botanist and Curator from 1933 to 1936. He described plants in the Myrtle family such as Melaleuca howeana. Apart from the myrtles, his other main botanic interest were the lichens. He traveled extensively in collection of botanical specimens, which are lodged in New South Wales. He has a street named after him in the suburb of Farrer, in the Australian Capital Territory.
