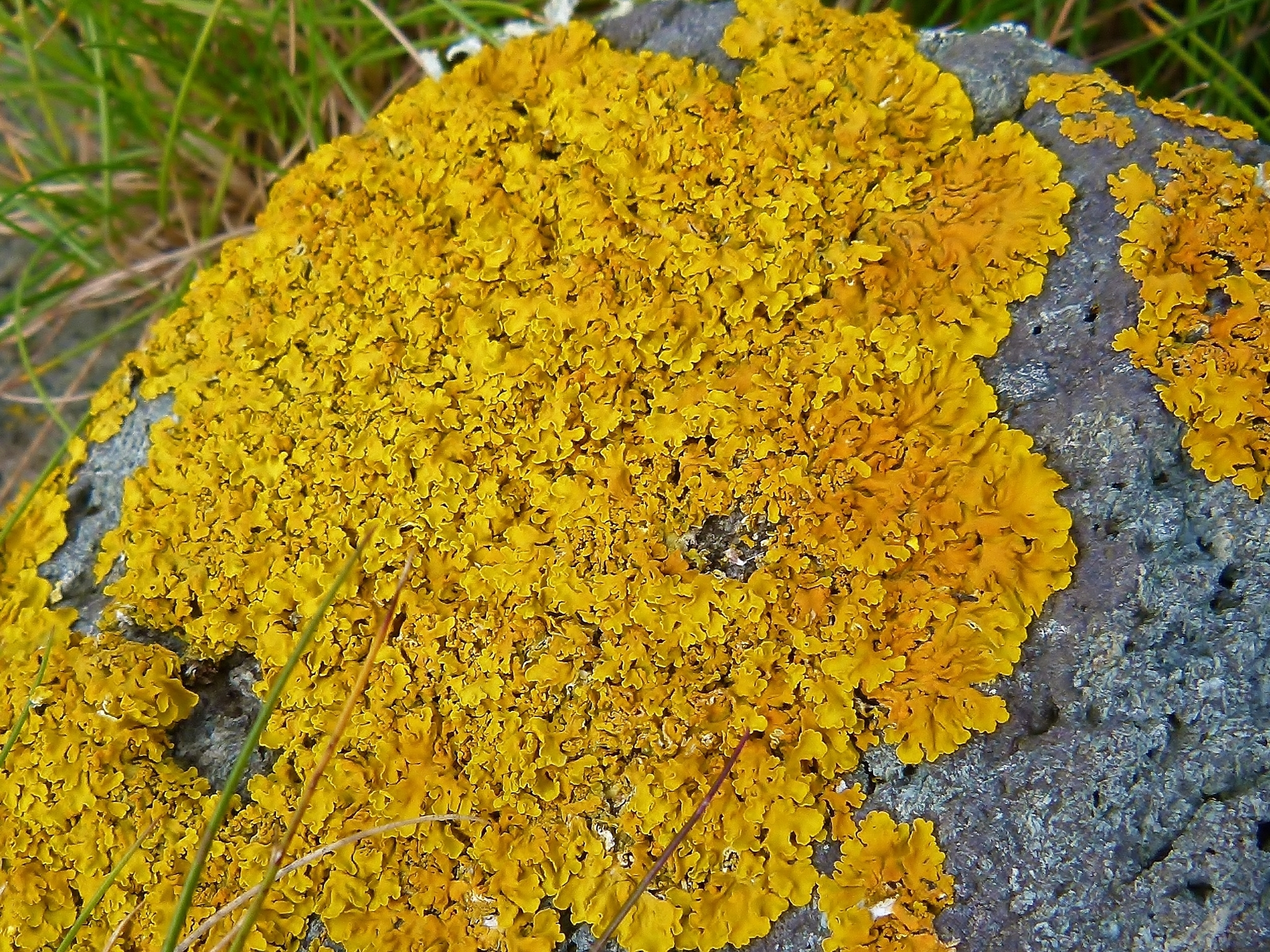

Scientific classification
- Kingdom: Fungi
- Division: Ascomycota
- Class: Lecanoromycetes
- Order: Teloschistales
- Family: Teloschistaceae
- Genus: Xanthoria
- Species: X. aureola

Binomial name
- Xanthoria aureola (Acharius) Erichsen (1930)

Synonyms
- Parmelia aureola Ach. (1810)

= Xanthoria aureola =

Species of lichen-forming fungus

Xanthoria aureola, commonly known as the seaside sunburst lichen, is a lichenized species of fungus in the family Teloschistaceae and phylum Ascomycota. X. aureola can be recognized by its bright yellow-orange pigmentation and abundant strap-shaped lobes. It is usually found growing on exposed, nutrient-rich rocks in sunny, maritime habitats. It is largely restricted to European coasts, stretching from Portugal to Norway.

== Taxonomy ==
Xanthoria aureola was first described as Parmelia aureola in 1809; it was found on seaside rocks in Boshuslän, Sweden and named by Erik Acharius. In 1930, Christian Erichsen transferred P. aureola to the genus Xanthoria at the species rank, resulting in the accepted binomial X. aureola. However, from 1965 to 1984, the classification X. aureola was mistakenly applied to X. calcicola, a closely related species first described in 1937. Within the genus Xanthoria, DNA sequencing has confirmed that X. aureola is most closely related to X. calcicola and more distantly related to X. parietina.

== Habitat and distribution ==
Xanthoria aureola grows on exposed maritime rocks in sunny areas. It generally grows on nutrient-rich, siliceous rocks, as well as limestone and lignum. It is found on European coasts 0–150 meters above sea level. Some countries in which X. aureola is commonly found include Spain, Portugal, France, Ireland, Denmark, Sweden, Norway, Italy, and the UK. It usually grows next to X. parietina, but in greater abundance and on exposed rock.

== Description ==
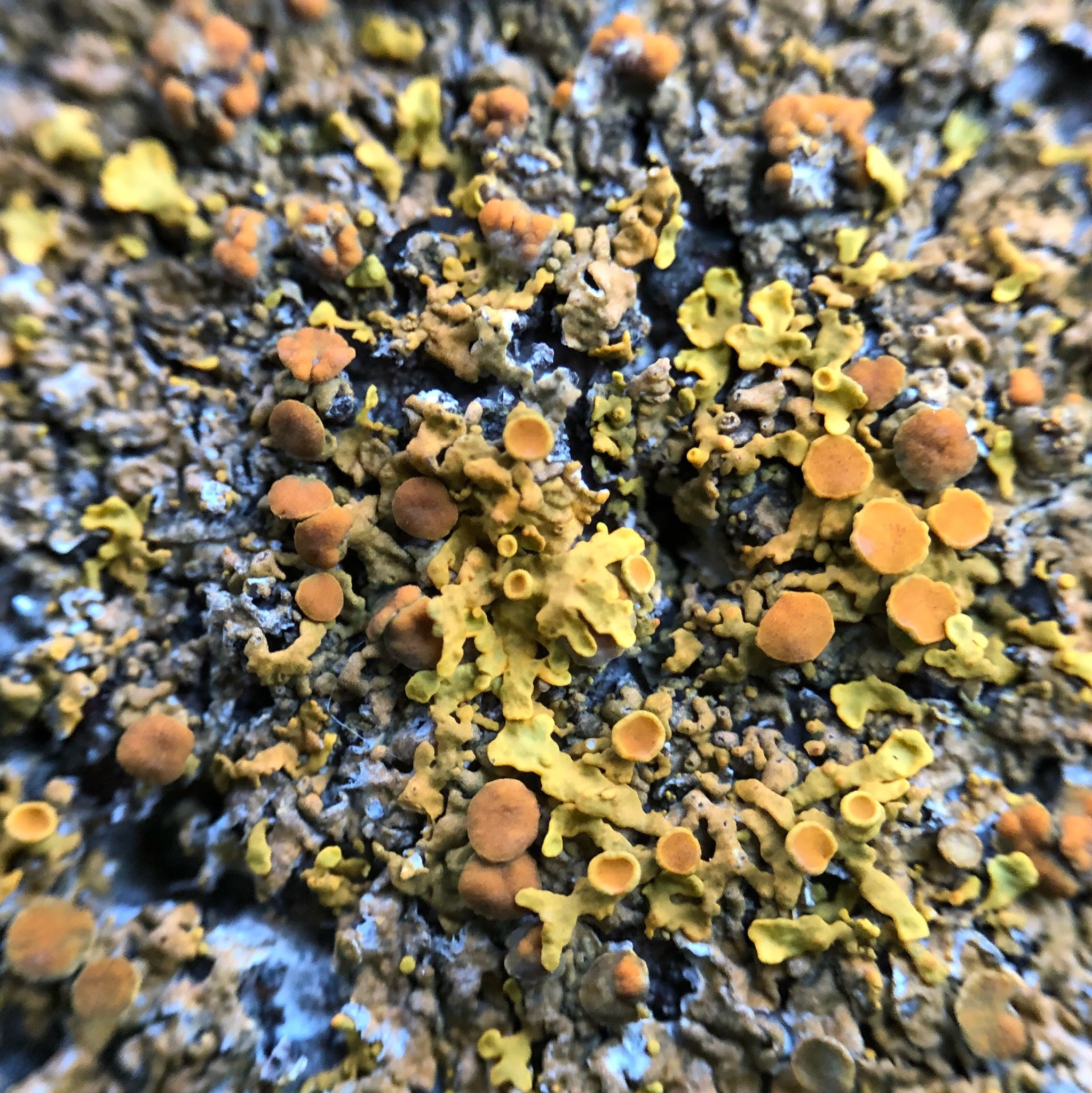
X. aureola apothecia on a rock in Tórshavn, Faroe Islands.

The thallus of X. aureola is bright yellow, orange, or orange-red with a foliose morphology. It is characterized by overlapping strap-shaped lobes that exhibit dichotomous branching. When treated with potassium hydroxide, the thallus turns deep red (K+ red). Average lobe width is 0.46–1.6 mm and average lobe thickness is 135 μm. X. aureola has a lower cortex, although no true rhizines. There are scattered hapters on the cream-colored underside of thick lobes. The upper cortex is rough with a layer of crystals, dotted with few apothecia. Chemicals such as parietin, fallacina, emodin, teloistin, and parietinic acid are present, as well as the dominant carotenoid mutatoxanthin. Mutatoxanthin, a carotenoid important in the protection of the photosynthetic component against harsh sunlight, represents 94.4% of the total carotenoid content in X. aureola. Of all Xanthoria species, X. aureola contains the most mutatoxanthin.

X. aureola is often confused with closely related species X. parietina and X. calcicola. In comparison, X. aureola has a brighter thallus color as well as a considerably thicker medulla (187 mm compared to 114–120 mm). Additionally, the rough upper surface of X. aureola contains few apothecia and does not contain soredia or isidia; laminar structures are lobules. Last, substrate is important: X. aureola is restricted to seashore rocks, while X. calcicola and X. parietinia can be found on almost any rock or wall.

== Ecology ==
The algal symbiont in X. aureola is Trebouxia. Trebouxia fixes ^{14}C mainly into ribitol during photosynthesis; approximately 80% is ribitol, 5% is sucrose, 4% is organic acids, and 9% is baseline CH. Therefore, ribitol is the main way in which carbohydrates are transferred among symbionts in the thallus. The flow of carbon from Trebouxia to the fungus is efficient, with a steady rate of 15 minutes. Little carbon (~2%) is stored as insoluble compounds in the thallus. The mean chlorophyll content per algal cell is 3.0-4.8 × 10^{−6} mg.

Environmental disturbance plays an important role in efficiency and productivity. Lichen species are often used to monitor pollution since they are sensitive to SO_{2}, heavy metals, salt, and high levels of UV. Environmental stress (i.e., increased UV light) enhances the creation of reactive oxygen species (ROS), including superoxide and hydrogen peroxide. The formation of ROS was higher in all treatments with greater UV, although Xanthoria species showed the greatest resilience under harsh light conditions. Additionally, pre-treatment with salicylic acid coupled with high-energy radiation resulted in fewer amino acids, notably Glu, Tyr, and Pro. Amino acids are essential in the formation of proteins and basic biochemical functions. Another experiment underscored the sensitivity of X. aureola to high concentrations of heavy metals and salt. Membrane integrity was measured via conductivity and potential photosystem II (PSII) efficiency (Fv/Fm), with the former being a more accurate measure. High UV, salt, and heavy metal concentrations increased membrane dissolution and electrolyte leakage. X. aureola was more resistant to salt than other lichenized species Lobaria pulmonaria and Parmelia sulcata. Copper and zinc had no effect on Fv/Fm of X. aureola. It is likely that zinc and iodine in seawater protect Trebouxia and increase resistance to high salt and UV. Increasing environmental stress may exacerbate ROS formation and electrolyte leakage.
