= Catillaria nigroclavata =

Scientific classification
- Kingdom: Fungi
- Division: Ascomycota
- Class: Lecanoromycetes
- Order: Lecanorales
- Family: Catillariaceae
- Genus: Catillaria
- Species: C. nigroclavata

Binomial name
- Catillaria nigroclavata (Nyl.) J.Steiner (1898)

Synonyms
- Biatorina lenticularis var. nigroclavata (Nyl.) Flagey; Biatorina nigroclavata (Nyl.) Arnold; Catillaria ilicis (A.Massal.) A.Massal.; Catillaria lenticularis f. nigroclavata (Nyl.) Boistel; Catillaria lenticularis var. nigroclavata; Catillaria nigroclavata (Nyl.) Schuler; Lecidea ilicis A.Massal. (1853); Lecidea nigroclavata Nyl.; Microlecia nigroclavata (Nyl.) M.Choisy

Species of lichen

Catillaria nigroclavata is a species of lichen belonging to the family Catillariaceae. It is mainly found in Europe and North America but it has also been reported from other continents.

Catillaria nigroclavata is an epiphyte which grows on the bark of trees. A study from Greece reported the lichen from near the Fethiye mosque in Ipeiros and Kos Island where it was found growing on the species Pinus pinea and Robinia pseudacacia, on the latter of which it grew alongside the lichen Hyperphyscia adglutinata.
