= Placolecis kunmingensis =

Scientific classification
- Kingdom: Fungi
- Division: Ascomycota
- Class: Lecanoromycetes
- Order: Lecanorales
- Family: Catillariaceae
- Genus: Placolecis
- Species: P. kunmingensis

Binomial name
- Placolecis kunmingensis A.C.Yin & Li S.Wang (2019)
- Holotype site: Baiyi village (Kunming, China)

Species of lichen

Placolecis kunmingensis is a species of saxicolous (rock-dwelling), crustose lichen in the family Catillariaceae. It is found in Yunnan, China. The lichen is characterised by a thallus that is areolate to squamulose in its centre, forming irregular patches or clumps 10–50 mm wide, as well as its ellipsoid or spherical ascospores with slightly thickened wall.

== Taxonomy ==
The lichen was formally described as a new species in 2019 by An-Cheng Yin and Li-Song Wang. The type specimen was collected in Baiyi village (Kunming, Yunnan province) at an elevation of 2,130 m (6,990 ft). This specimen, collected by Wang and colleagues on April 12, 2018, was found growing on rock.

== Description ==
Placolecis kunmingensis has a crustose (crust-like) to effigurate (radiating) thallus, forming irregular patches or clumps ranging from 10 to 50 mm wide. In the centre, it features areolate-squamulose (divided into small, scale-like sections) structures, with shorter lobules sometimes radiating at the margins. These lobes are typically 0.5 to 1 mm long and 0.2 to 0.3 mm wide in the middle, expanding to 0.35 to 0.5 mm at the tips, dark brown in colour, and swollen at the tip. They have equal dichotomous (evenly branching) patterns, with secondary lobules sometimes indistinct from the main lobes. The upper surface of the thallus is dark brownish and uneven.

The upper cortex is 25 to 30 μm thick and has a paraplectenchymatous (loosely interwoven) structure. The algal layer is uniform, 50 to 70 μm thick, with Trebouxia-like (a type of green algae) photobiont cells measuring 7 to 12.5 μm in diameter. The medulla (internal layer) is 180 to 250 μm thick, with a reddish-orange upper portion and a white lower portion. There is no lower cortex present.

Reproductive structures (apothecia) are 0.3 to 1.2 mm in diameter, sessile (attached directly without a stalk), lecideine, and range from scattered to crowded, with a well-developed, black margin. The exciple (the outer rim of the apothecium) is 40 to 60 μm thick at the sides and black in colour. The epihymenium (uppermost layer of the apothecium) is 7 to 15 μm thick and brown. The hymenium (spore-bearing layer) is hyaline (translucent), 50 to 75 μm thick. The hypothecium (layer beneath the hymenium) is 75 to 120 μm thick and brown. The asci (spore-producing structures) are clavate (club-shaped) to cylindrical, Catillaria-type with an amyloid tholus, and contain eight spores. The paraphyses (filament-like structures in the hymenium) are simple or sparsely branched, with a dark brown cap at the apex. Ascospores are hyaline (translucent), simple, spherical or ellipsoid, measuring 5 to 10 by 4 to 6 μm, with a smooth wall 0.5 to 1 μm thick. Pycnidia (asexual reproductive structures) are numerous, mostly immersed in the thallus about two-thirds of the way in. They are pear-shaped, measure 150 to 190 by 100 to 130 μm, and have a slightly black ostiole (opening). The conidia (asexual spores) are bacilliform (rod-shaped), measuring 3 to 5 μm.

In terms of reactions to standard chemical spot tests, the medulla is K+ (violet) in its upper yellow portion, and P−, C−. The use of thin-layer chromatography shows the presence of fragilin and an anthraquinone substance.
