= Placolecis sublaevis =

Scientific classification
- Kingdom: Fungi
- Division: Ascomycota
- Class: Lecanoromycetes
- Order: Lecanorales
- Family: Catillariaceae
- Genus: Placolecis
- Species: P. sublaevis

Binomial name
- Placolecis sublaevis A.C.Yin & Li S.Wang (2019)
- Holotype site: Lijiang City (Yunnan, China)

Species of lichen

Placolecis sublaevis is a species of saxicolous (rock-dwelling), crustose lichen in the family Catillariaceae. It is found in Yunnan and Sichuan, China. The crust-like, radiating body of the lichen forms irregular patches or clumps and includes numerous false conidiomata, a type of asexual reproductive structure, within its thallus. Its lobes, dark brown and slightly flattened at the top, form larger groups at the edges and contain an upper layer composed of loosely interwoven cells and a lower inner tissue that varies from reddish-orange to white.

== Taxonomy ==
The lichen was formally described as a new species in 2019 by An-Cheng Yin and Li-Song Wang. The type specimen was collected by Wang and colleagues on the way from Lijiang to Ninglang (Lijiang City, Yunnan province) at an elevation of 1,902 m (6,240 ft). This specimen was found growing on limestone. The species name sublaevis alludes to the somewhat flattened shape of the lobes at their tips.

== Description ==
Placolecis sublaevis has a crustose (crust-like) to effigurate (radiating) thallus. In the centre, it has an areolate-squamulose (divided into small, scale-like sections) structure, forming irregular patches or clumps. The thallus incorporates numerous pseudopycnidia (false conidiomata, a type of asexual reproductive structure) that are immersed within it. The lobes of this lichen distinctively form larger aggregations at the margins, measuring 2–3 (occasionally up to 4) mm long and 0.1–0.3 mm wide in the middle, slightly widening towards the tips to 0.15–0.4 mm. These lobes are dark brown and slightly flattened at the apex, often with secondary lobules branching from the main lobes and reaching 1–2 mm in length.

The lichen's upper surface is dark brownish with an uneven texture. Its upper cortex, the outermost layer, is 12.5–20 μm thick with a paraplectenchymatous (loosely interwoven) structure. The algal layer is diffuse, spanning 25–40 μm in thickness, with Trebouxia-like photobiont (symbiotic green algae) cells measuring 6–12 μm in diameter. The medulla (the inner tissue of the thallus) varies in thickness from 60 to 140 μm and shows a reddish-orange colouration in the upper portion, transitioning to white in the lower portion. This species does not have a lower cortex, nor does it have apothecia (fruiting bodies).

Reproductive structures, known as pycnidia, are numerous and immersed within the thallus. They measure 75–95 by 40–60 μm, are urceolate (jug-shaped), and have a black ostiole (opening). The conidia (asexual spores) of this species are bacilliform (rod-shaped) and measure 5–6 μm.

In terms of reactions to standard chemical spot test, the medulla of Placolecis sublaevis is K+ (violet) in its upper yellow part, as well as P− and C−. Chemical analysis using thin-layer chromatography shows the presence of fragilin, solorinic acid, and anthraquinones.

== Habitat and distribution ==
This species is found in the high mountain regions of Yunnan and Sichuan in southeast China, specifically on exposed steep slopes adorned with limestone boulders near streams.
