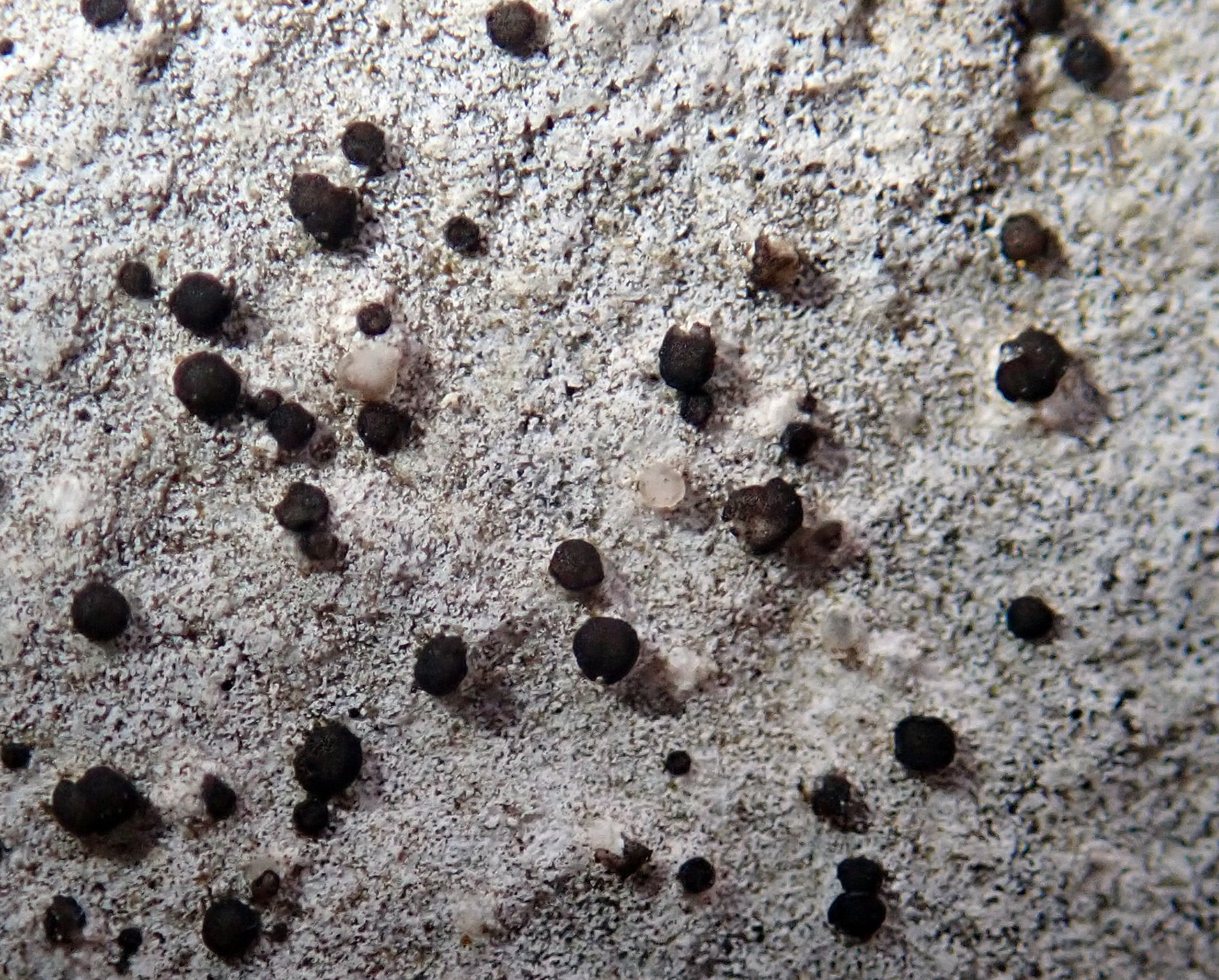

Scientific classification
- Domain: Eukaryota
- Kingdom: Fungi
- Division: Ascomycota
- Class: Lecanoromycetes
- Order: Lecanorales
- Family: Catillariaceae
- Genus: Catillaria
- Species: C. glaucogrisea

Binomial name
- Catillaria glaucogrisea Fryday (2004)

= Catillaria glaucogrisea =

Species of lichen

Catillaria glaucogrisea is a species of saxicolous (rock-dwelling), crustose lichen in the family Catillariaceae. Found on Campbell Islands, where it grows on limestone, it was formally described as new to science in 2004 by the lichenologist Alan Fryday. The lichen has a pale grey areolate thallus up to 0.15 mm thick, with deep cracks separating the areoles. Its apothecia (fruiting bodies) are black, and it makes ascospores measuring 4–6 μm wide.
