= Catillaria flexuosa =

Scientific classification
- Kingdom: Fungi
- Division: Ascomycota
- Class: Lecanoromycetes
- Order: Lecanorales
- Family: Catillariaceae
- Genus: Catillaria
- Species: C. flexuosa

Binomial name
- Catillaria flexuosa van den Boom & Alvarado (2021)

Species of lichen

Catillaria flexuosa is a species of crustose lichen in the family Catillariaceae. It is found in the south of the Netherlands, where it grows on the bark of roadside ash trees.

== Taxonomy ==
The lichen was formally described as a new species in 2021 by lichenologists Pieter van den Boom and Pablo Alvarado. The type specimen was collected south of the village of Zijtaart, where it was found growing on a medium-sized ash tree along the side of a road.

== Description ==
The newly described lichen is closely related to Catillaria chalybeia, the type species of genus Catillaria. Several morphological features of the thallus distinguish Catillaria flexuosa–it is dark green and relatively thick (up to 0.4 mm), continuous to weakly rimose, areolate, with knobby granules, and it can sometimes become somewhat squamulose. The apothecia of C. flexuosa are abundant on the thallus. They are typically flat with a small but conspicuous proper margin, and often have a flexuous form–bending in alternate directions. It is for this last feature that the species is given its specific epithet. No secondary chemicals were detected in the lichen using thin layer chromatography.

== Habitat and distribution ==
Catillaria flexuosa is a corticolous lichen, and grows on the bark of Fraxinus excelsior trees. Its limited geographical distribution includes five locations in the east of the province of Noord-Brabant.
