= Catillaria gilbertii =

Scientific classification
- Domain: Eukaryota
- Kingdom: Fungi
- Division: Ascomycota
- Class: Lecanoromycetes
- Order: Lecanorales
- Family: Catillariaceae
- Genus: Catillaria
- Species: C. gilbertii

Binomial name
- Catillaria gilbertii Fryday & Coppins (1996)

Species of lichen

Catillaria gilbertii is a rare species of saxicolous (rock-dwelling), crustose lichen in the family Catillariaceae. It is found in the Central Highlands of Scotland.

== Taxonomy ==
The lichen was formally described as a new species in 1996 by lichenologists Alan Fryday and Brian Coppins. The type specimen was collected by the first author from the Ben Lawers National Nature Reserve (Perthshire) at an altitude of 890 m (2,920 ft); there, it was found growing on an east-facing mica-schist rock face. The species epithet was named to honour British lichenologist Oliver Gilbert "for his pioneering work on the montane lichen vegetation of the British Isles". They noted that the naming of this species, which produces twice the usual number of ascospores in its asci, was "particularly appropriate given the pre-disposition of the Gilbert family for producing twice the usual number of offspring at a time; Dr Gilbert himself is a twin and he also has twin daughters".

== Description ==
The lichen has dark-brown to dark grey thallus that is bluish-grey when wet. It is areolate (with individual areoles measuring about 0.15–0.27 mm in diameter), cracked, and effuse. Its apothecia are dark brown to black with a lecideine form and a diameter between 0.3–0.7 mm; there is a slightly raised proper margin (width of 0.04–0.1 mm) surrounding the flat or slightly convex disc. Its ascospores are hyaline with an oblong to ellipsoid shape and a single septum, and measure 10–12 by 2.5–3 μm. The spores typically number 16 per ascus, which itself is of the Catillaria-type—with a uniformly amyloid dome at the apex. Immersed in the thallus surface are conidiomata in the form of pycnidia; they are 60–80 μm in diameter and produce conidia that are ellipsoid to ovoid with dimensions of 2.5–3 by 0.8–1.4 μm.

All parts of Catillaria gilbertii do not react with any of the standard chemical spot tests used to test for the presence of lichen products.

== Habitat and distribution ==
Catillaria gilbertii is only known to occur in the mica-schist mountains of the Scottish Central Highlands. In addition to the type locality, it has also been recorded in Glen Esk in Angus. It is one of relatively few endemic lichens known in Scotland, and one of even fewer that inhabit the hyper-oceanic mountain habitat, above the tree line. Two similar species that occur in the same habitat are Catillaria chlybeia and Halecania rhypodiza.
