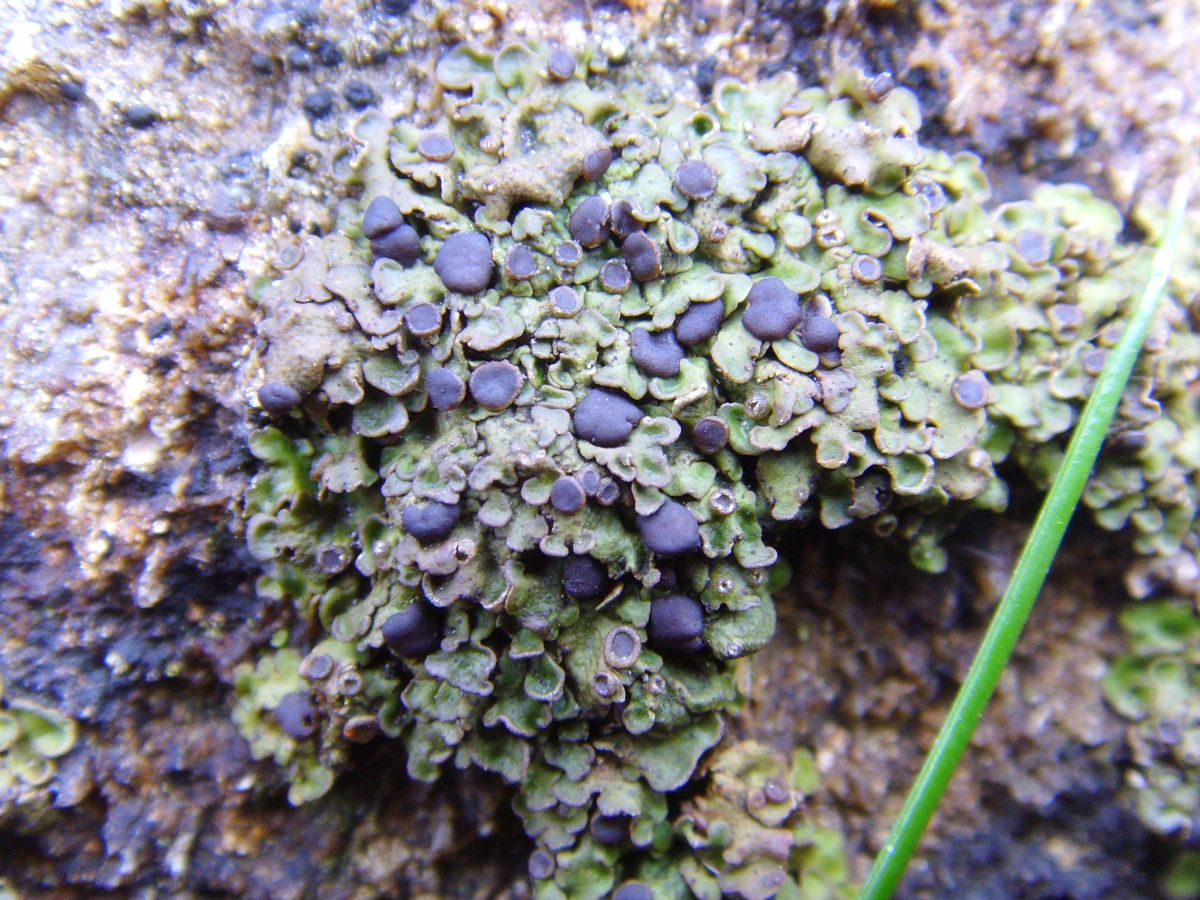
- Solenopsora holophaea, France

Scientific classification
- Kingdom: Fungi
- Division: Ascomycota
- Class: Lecanoromycetes
- Order: Lecanorales
- Family: Catillariaceae
- Genus: Solenopsora; A.Massal. (1855)

Type species
- Solenopsora requienii A.Massal. (1855)

Synonyms
- Catillaria sect. Placodiella Zahlbr. (1926); Diphratora Trevis. ex Jatta (1900); Diphratora sect. Ricasolia (A.Massal.) Jatta (1900); Lecania sect. Placolecania J.Steiner (1896); Placodiella (Zahlbr.) Szatala (1941); Placolecania (J.Steiner) Zahlbr. (1906); Ricasolia A.Massal. (1855)

= Solenopsora =

Genus of lichen

Solenopsora is a genus of lichen-forming fungi in the family Catillariaceae. It has 15 species, with a mostly Northern Hemisphere distribution.

== Taxonomy ==
The genus was circumscribed by Italian lichenologist Abramo Bartolommeo Massalongo in 1855, with Solenopsora requienii assigned as the type species. However, this species had previously been described in 1840 by Camille Montagne, as Parmelia holophaea.

== Description ==
Solenopsora lichens produce thalli of various morphologies, including crust-like (crustose), scaley (squamulose), and leafy (foliose). Depending on the species, the apothecia may be immersed on the substrate, emergent on the substrate surface, or somewhat elevated on a stalk (stipitate). A combination of microscopic characteristics define the genus Solenopsora. They all have asci that contain eight spores, and are of the Catillaria-type. This means that they have a prominent, amyloid tholus (the thickened inner part of the tip of an ascus) that lacks any internal differentiation such as an axial body. They have simple (i.e. unbranched) paraphyses with an internal brown pigmentation and club-shaped tips. Their ascospores are colourless and translucent (hyaline), and contain a single septum.

Catillaria is a closely related genus that differs mainly in having a thallus that is always crustose, and apothecia with a proper margin.

== Habitat and distribution ==
Most Solenopsora species are found in the Northern Hemisphere, including Asia, Europe, western North Africa, North America, and the Canary Islands. Three species are known from Australia. Eight species occur in Europe.

== Species ==
As of December 2024, Species Fungorum accepts 15 species of Solenopsora:

- Solenopsora candicans (Dicks.) J.Steiner (1915)
- Solenopsora cesatii (A.Massal.) Zahlbr. (1919)
- Solenopsora chihuahuana B.D.Ryan & Timdal (2011)
- Solenopsora cladonioides B.D.Ryan & Timdal (2011)
- Solenopsora cyathiformis (Szatala) van den Boom (2004)
- Solenopsora elixiana Verdon & Rambold (1998) – Queensland; La Réunion; Taiwan
- Solenopsora grisea (Bagl.) Kotlov (2004)
- Solenopsora holophaea (Mont.) Samp. (1921)
- Solenopsora isidiata van den Boom & Ertz (2012)
- Solenopsora liparina (Nyl.) Zahlbr. (1919)
- Solenopsora olivacea (Dufour) H.Kilias (1981)
- Solenopsora requienii A.Massal. (1855)
- Solenopsora sordida (C.W.Dodge) D.J.Galloway (2004) – New Zealand
- Solenopsora tasmanica Kantvilas (2004) – Tasmania
- Solenopsora vulturiensis A.Massal. (1856) – Western Australia; Europe; Macaronesia
