= Catillaria gerroana =

Scientific classification
- Kingdom: Fungi
- Division: Ascomycota
- Class: Lecanoromycetes
- Order: Lecanorales
- Family: Catillariaceae
- Genus: Catillaria
- Species: C. gerroana

Binomial name
- Catillaria gerroana P.M.McCarthy & Elix (2017)

Species of lichen

Catillaria gerroana is a species of crustose lichen in the family Catillariaceae. Found in Australia, it was described as a new species in 2017 by the lichenologists Patrick McCarthy and John Elix. The type specimen was collected in Black Head Reserve (Gerroa, New South Wales), where it was found growing on sandstone cliffs of the intertidal zone. The specific epithet refers to the type locality, which is the only location that this lichen is known to occur. This lichen forms thin, grey-green crusts on sandstone that are covered with extremely numerous, small dark green to black fruiting bodies that start flat but become dome-shaped. The species lacks distinctive lichen products and is characterized by its abundant calcium oxalate crystals and specific spore dimensions.

== Taxonomy ==
Catillaria gerroana was described in 2017 by Patrick McCarthy and John Elix during their survey of coastal lichens from southern New South Wales. The epithet gerroana commemorates the type locality, Black Head at Gerroa, on the state's South Coast. Morphologically and chemically the species belongs to the Catillaria chalybeia group within the family Catillariaceae, a lineage characterised by crustose thalli without secondary metabolites, small dark fruit-bodies (lecideine apothecia) and thin-walled, one-septate spores. It differs from others in the genus in having apothecia (fruiting bodies) that become strongly convex to hemispherical and whose brown margin is rapidly excluded, whereas related northern-hemisphere species such as C. chalybeia and C. atomarioides retain flatter discs with persistent black rims. It also lacks the β-orcinol depsidones found in the southern Australian C. austrolittoralis and produces slightly shorter, narrower spores than that species.

== Description ==
The thallus of Catillaria gerroana forms a thin, paint-like crust (to about 80 μm thick) that adheres tightly to sandstone and spreads in patches up to 10 cm across. Its surface is pale to medium grey-green, smooth to faintly cracked, and lacks a true cortex—meaning the green algal layer sits directly beneath a thin skin of fungal tissue. Calcium oxalate crystals are abundant within the medulla and give the lichen a gritty feel when cut. The partner alga (photobiont) consists of spherical chlorococcoid cells 6–15 μm wide, interwoven with short fungal hyphae.

Apothecia (fruiting bodies) are extremely numerous, initially flat but soon becoming markedly convex and finally almost hemispherical; each measures roughly 0.23–0.48 mm in diameter. The disc is dull dark green to greenish-black and non-powdery, while the narrow margin is the same colour and quickly disappears as the disc expands. Microscopically, the excipulum (rim) shows an outer brown zone that turns deep red-brown in nitric acid, and an inner clear zone. The colourless hymenium is 40–50 μm tall and capped by a dark brown epihymenium. Paraphyses are slender but swell abruptly at their tips, each tip containing a dark pigment cap. Asci are of the Catillaria-type and hold eight colourless, thin-walled ascospores that are narrowly ellipsoid to short-fusiform, usually slightly constricted at the septum, and typically measure around 11.5 × 4.5 μm. Minute flask-shaped pycnidia immersed in the thallus release narrowly ellipsoid to oblong conidia 2–3 × 1–1.5 μm, providing an additional asexual dispersal route. Standard spot tests are all negative and thin-layer chromatography detects no secondary metabolites, a profile typical for many Catillaria species.

== Habitat and distribution ==
As of its original publication, the species was known only from its type locality: weather-beaten sandstone outcrops on the foreshore at Black Head, Gerroa, New South Wales. It grows just above the high-tide zone where surfaces receive regular sea spray and occasional runoff, forming mosaics with other maritime crusts such as Buellia cranwelliae, various Caloplaca species, Rinodinella fertilis, Pertusaria melanospora var. sorediata and Verrucaria aff. fusconigrescens. No additional populations have been located despite targeted searches along comparable coastal cliffs.
