= Austrolecia =

Scientific classification
- Kingdom: Fungi
- Division: Ascomycota
- Class: Lecanoromycetes
- Order: Lecanorales
- Family: Catillariaceae
- Genus: Austrolecia; Hertel (1984)
- Species: A. antarctica

Binomial name
- Austrolecia antarctica Hertel 1984

Species of lichen

Austrolecia is a fungal genus in the family Catillariaceae. It is a monotypic genus, containing the single crustose lichen species Austrolecia antarctica. Both the genus and species were described as new to science in 1984 by German lichenologist Hannes Hertel. The lichen is found on the boulders and moraines of Livingston Island (South Shetland Islands, Antarctica). Indicator species analysis suggests that the lichen prefers to grow on north-facing (rather than south-facing) rock surfaces.
