= Xanthopsorella =

Scientific classification
- Kingdom: Fungi
- Division: Ascomycota
- Class: Lecanoromycetes
- Order: Lecanorales
- Family: Catillariaceae
- Genus: Xanthopsorella; Kalb & Hafellner (1984)
- Species: X. texana

Binomial name
- Xanthopsorella texana (W.A.Weber) Kalb & Hafellner (1984)

Synonyms
- Genus: Xanthopsora Gotth.Schneid. & W.A.Weber (1980); Species: Psora texana W.A.Weber (1977); Xanthopsora texana (W.A.Weber) Gotth.Schneid. & W.A.Weber (1980)

Genus of lichens

Xanthopsorella is a fungal genus in the family Catillariaceae. It comprises the single species Xanthopsorella texana, a saxicolous (rock-dwelling), squamulose lichen found in the Southern United States and Mexico.

== Taxonomy ==
The American lichenologist William Alfred Weber originally named the species Psora texana in 1977. He collected the type specimen in 1974 from Llano County, Texas in the Guadalupe River canyon along highway 39. It was found growing as squamulose (scaly) rosettes on the vertical rock faces of limestone cliffs. In a 1980 publication, Gotthard Schneider and Weber proposed that the taxon be transferred to the genus Xanthopsora. Klaus Kalb and Josef Hafellner circumscribed the new genus Xanthopsorella to contain the species in 1984. As of 2016, there was no molecular sequence data available for this taxon.

Another taxon proposed for inclusion in the genus, Xanthopsorella llimonae Hertel, Egea & Poelt (1987), has been shown to be synonymous with Glyphopeltis ligustica.

== Description ==
Xanthopsorella texana has a squamulose thallus that ranges in color from raw sienna to yellowish to reddish. The thallus grows in the form of rosettes up to 3 or 4 cm (1.2 or 1.6 in) in diameter, and these comprise individual squamules up to 5 mm (0.2 in) in diameter on the thallus margins, and about 2–3 mm in the inner (laminal) areas of the thallus. The upper cortex has a pseudoparenchymatous tissue structure and is 30–50 μm thick. The apothecia (fruiting bodies) made by the lichen are black to purplish black and sessile with a somewhat constricted base. The ascospores, which number eight per ascus, are spherical and hyaline, measuring 3 to 4 μm in diameter.

== Habitat and distribution ==
In additional to the type locality in Texas, Xanthopsorella texana has also been recorded in Mexico, including Coahuila, San Luis Potosí, Tamaulipas, and Chiapas. It grows on limestone.
