= Ioannina Castle =

Fortification within Ioannina city, Greece

- Κάστρο Ιωαννίνων
- Ioannina, Epirus
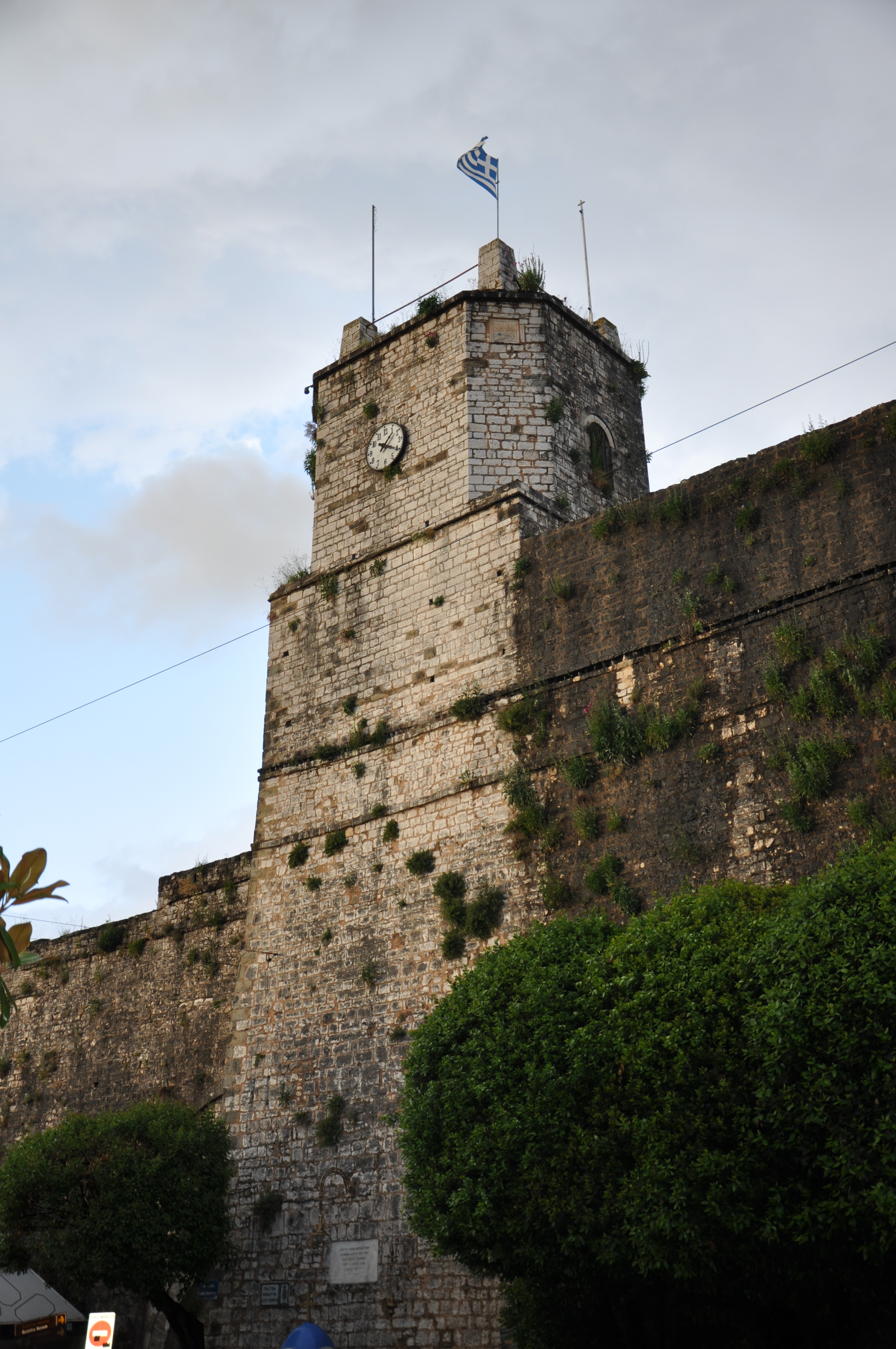
- Clock tower over the main gate of the Ioannina Castle

Site information
- Type: Citadel
- Owner: Government of Greece
- Controlled by: Byzantine Empire 6th century/1020–1204; Despotate of Epirus 1204–1319; Byzantine Empire 1319–1346; Serbian Empire 1346–1366; Despotate of Epirus 1366–1430; Ottoman Empire 1430–1913
- Open to the public: Yes
- Condition: Mostly intact

Location
- Location within Greece
- Coordinates: 39.4018°N 20.5138°E

Site history
- Built: (before) 1020
- Built by: Byzantine Empire
- Materials: Hewn stone (ashlar)

The Ioannina Castle (Greek: Κάστρο Ιωαννίνων) is the fortified old town of the city of Ioannina in northwestern Greece. The present fortification dates largely to the reconstruction under Ali Pasha in the late Ottoman period, but incorporates also pre-existing Byzantine elements.

== History ==
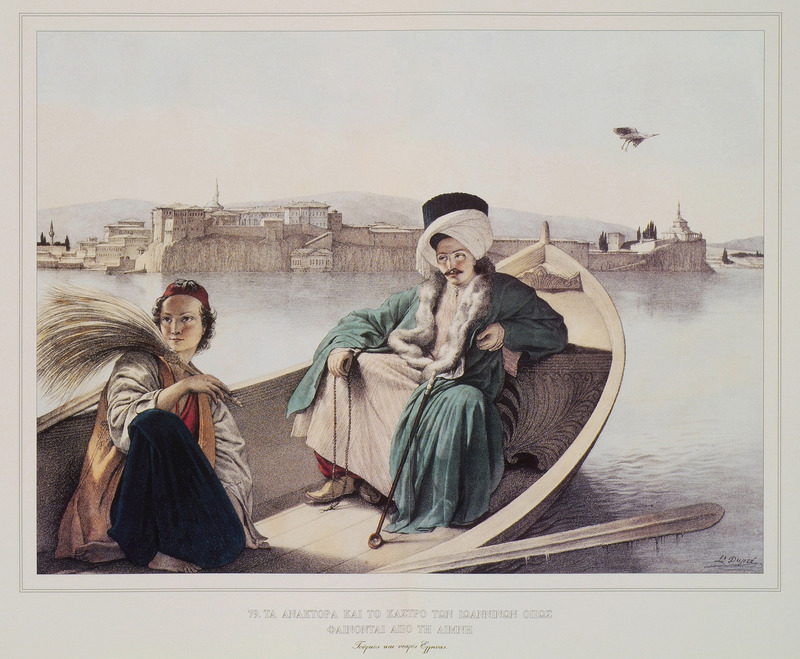
View of Its Kale and the palace of Ali Pasha from the Lake of Ioannina in the 1820s, by Louis Dupré

Ioannina is first definitely mentioned in a 1020 decree by the Byzantine emperor Basil II, but it clearly existed for several centuries before. Traditionally, the foundation and first fortification of the city have been placed in the 6th century, when the historian Procopius (De Aedificiis, IV.1.39–42) records the construction of a new, "well-fortified" city by the Byzantine emperor Justinian I (r. 527–565) for the inhabitants of ancient Euroia. This view is not supported, however, by any concrete archaeological evidence. Early 21st-century excavations furthermore have brought to light fortifications dating to the Hellenistic period (4th–3rd centuries BC), the course of which was largely followed by later reconstructions of the fortress in the Byzantine and Ottoman periods. The identification of the site with one of the known ancient cities of Epirus has not yet been possible. The Greek archaeologist K. Tsoures dated the Byzantine city walls and the northeastern citadel to the 10th century. Additions in the late 11th century, including the southeastern citadel, are traditionally ascribed to the short-lived occupation of the city by the Normans under the leadership of Bohemond of Taranto.

After the fall of the Byzantine Empire to the Fourth Crusade in 1204, the town's history was turbulent: it became part of the Byzantine Greek successor state of Epirus, fell to the restored Byzantine Empire under the Palaiologos dynasty in 1319, and was captured by the Serbian ruler Stefan Dushan in 1346. The Florentine adventurer Esau de' Buondelmonti captured the city from its Serbian rulers in 1385, to be followed by the Tocco family, rulers of Cephalonia and Zakynthos, from 1411 until the capture of the city by the Ottoman Empire on 9 October 1430. In the years immediately after 1204, the city walls and the northeastern citadel were reconstructed, while further reconstruction was undertaken in 1367–84 under Thomas Preljubović. The course of the Byzantine walls largely coincides with the extant fortification, but few details about it, such as the number and structure of the towers, were known until excavations during the last couple of decades.

The city remained under Ottoman rule from 1430 until captured by Greece in the First Balkan War in 1913. In the Ottoman era, the city enjoyed considerable prosperity, and reached the height of its pre-eminence under the rule of Ali Pasha, who became the ruler of a large semi-autonomous state encompassing much of modern-day Greece and Albania between 1787 and his downfall and execution in 1822. It is to the period of Ali Pasha's rule that the present form of the castle largely dates; the modifications or repairs undertaken on the Byzantine walls by previous Ottoman governors are now no longer discernible, as Ali Pasha initiated a wide-ranging reconstruction of the walls in the early 19th century, which was completed in 1815. It incorporated, as far as was possible, the pre-existing Byzantine fortifications, while adding a new wall in front. The interval was filled up with rubble or provided with arched galleries, forming a large terraced surface on top on which cannon could be installed.

== Layout and monuments ==
The castle is located on the southeastern corner of the modern city, atop a rocky promontory jutting into Lake Pamvotis. The castle is dominated by its two citadels, already established by the late 11th century as recorded in Anna Komnene's Alexiad: the northeastern citadel, now dominated by the Ottoman Aslan Pasha Mosque, and the much larger southeastern citadel, also known as Its Kale (from Turkish: Iç Kale, "Inner Castle").

=== Northeastern citadel ===
The northeastern citadel covers an area of approximately 6,000 m^{2}, and is surrounded by a wall that dates partly to the Byzantine period, including the monumental southern gate, flanked by a large circular tower. In Byzantine times, this was called the "Upper Tower" (επάνω γουλάς) and was the seat of the local governor and later of the Despots of Epirus. The citadel comprised a palace as well as a church dedicated to Saint John.

Following the failed uprising of Dionysius the Philosopher in 1611 and the subsequent expulsion of the Christian population from the walled town, the church of St. John was torn down and replaced in 1618 by the Aslan Pasha Mosque complex, comprising the mosque, the founder's tomb (türbe), a madrasah and a kitchen, which survive to this day. The citadel became the Muslim religious centre of the city. Today the Aslan Pasha Mosque houses the Municipal Ethnographic Museum of Ioannina.

Outside the citadel but in close proximity lie the Turkish Library, probably attached to the madrasah, an Ottoman bath (hamam) and the Soufari Sarai ("horsemen's palace"), a cavalry barracks built in the last years of Ali Pasha's rule (1815–20). There is also a Byzantine bath complex in the vicinity.

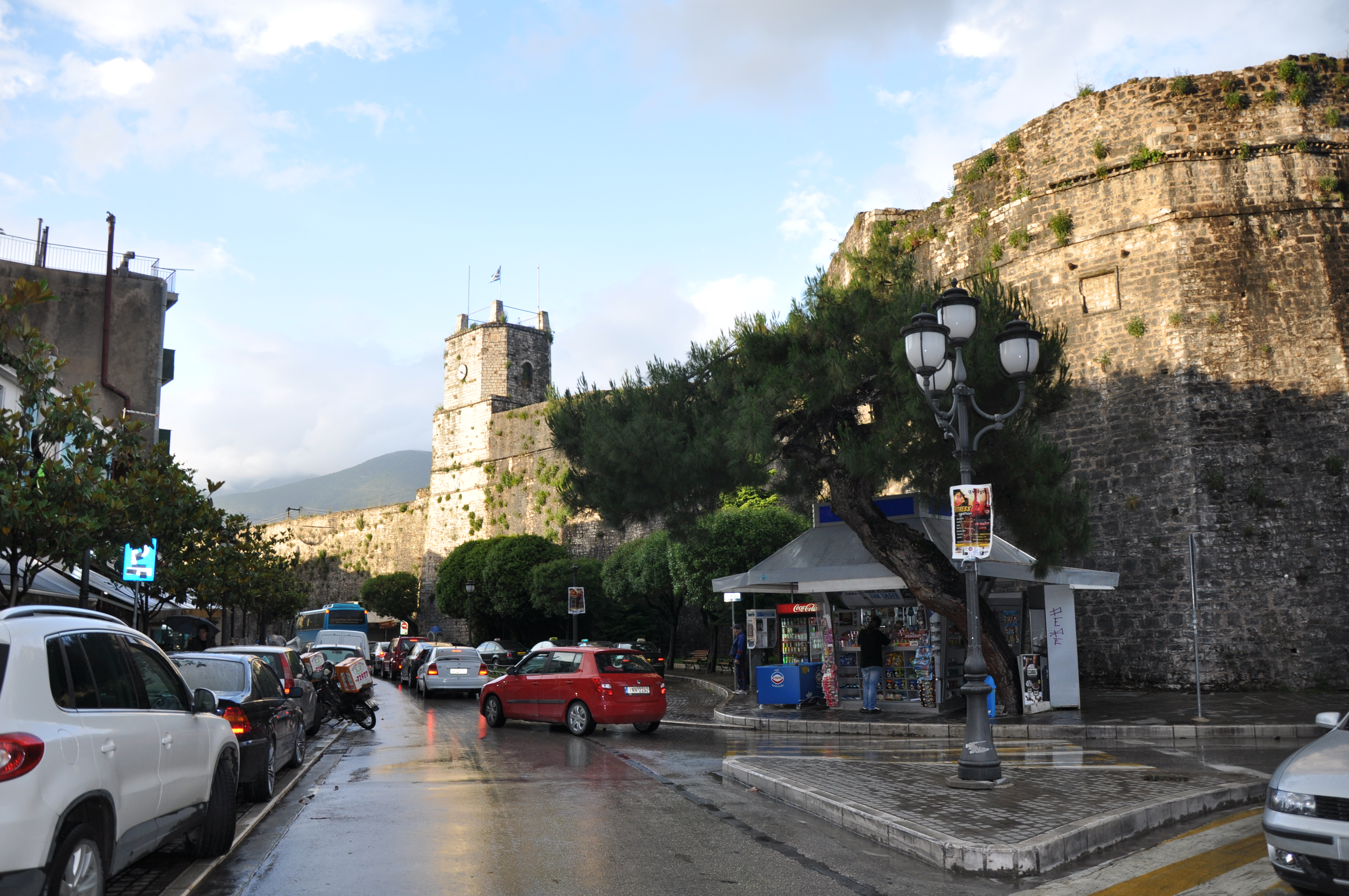
Road to the castle

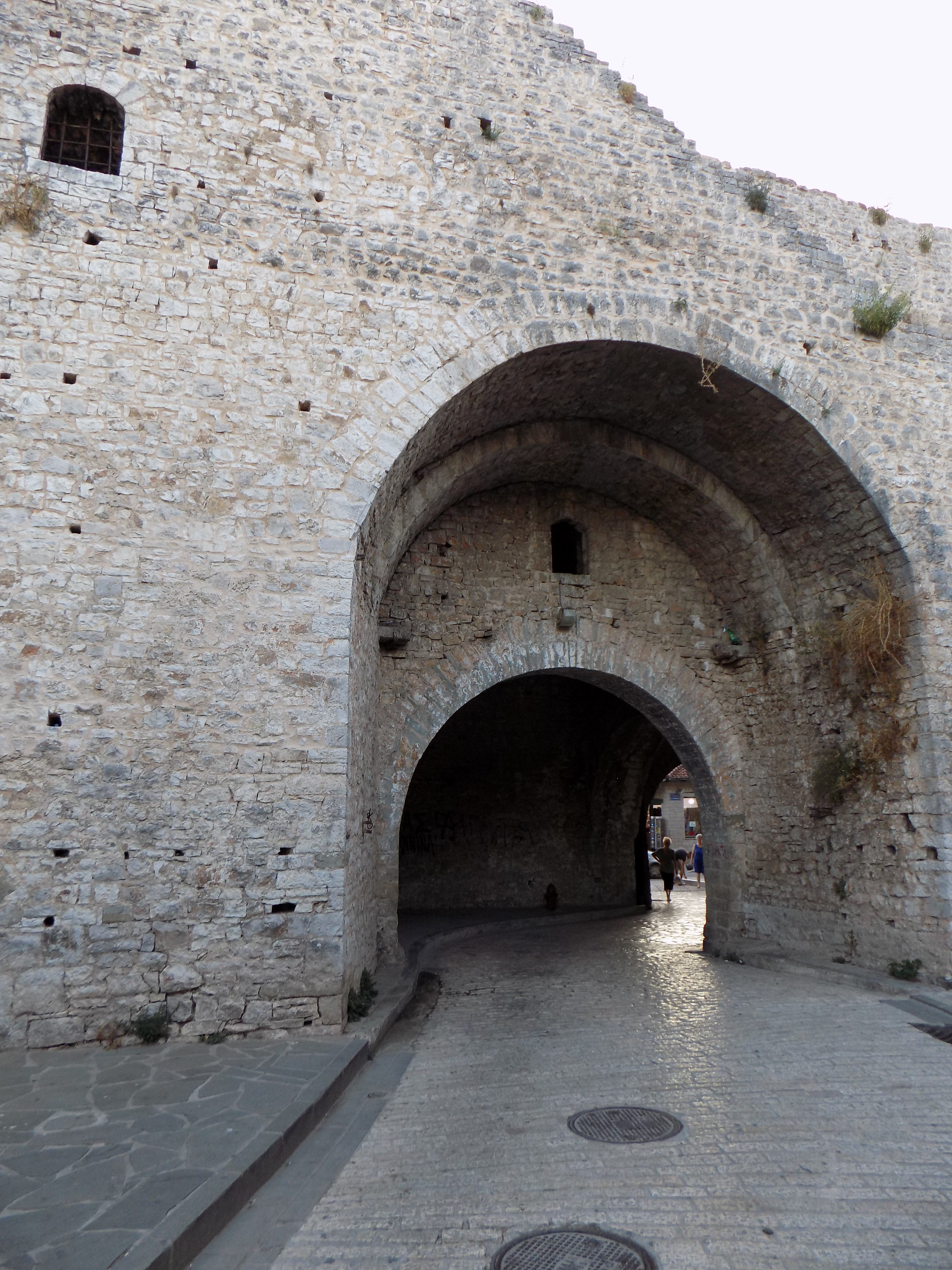
West gate

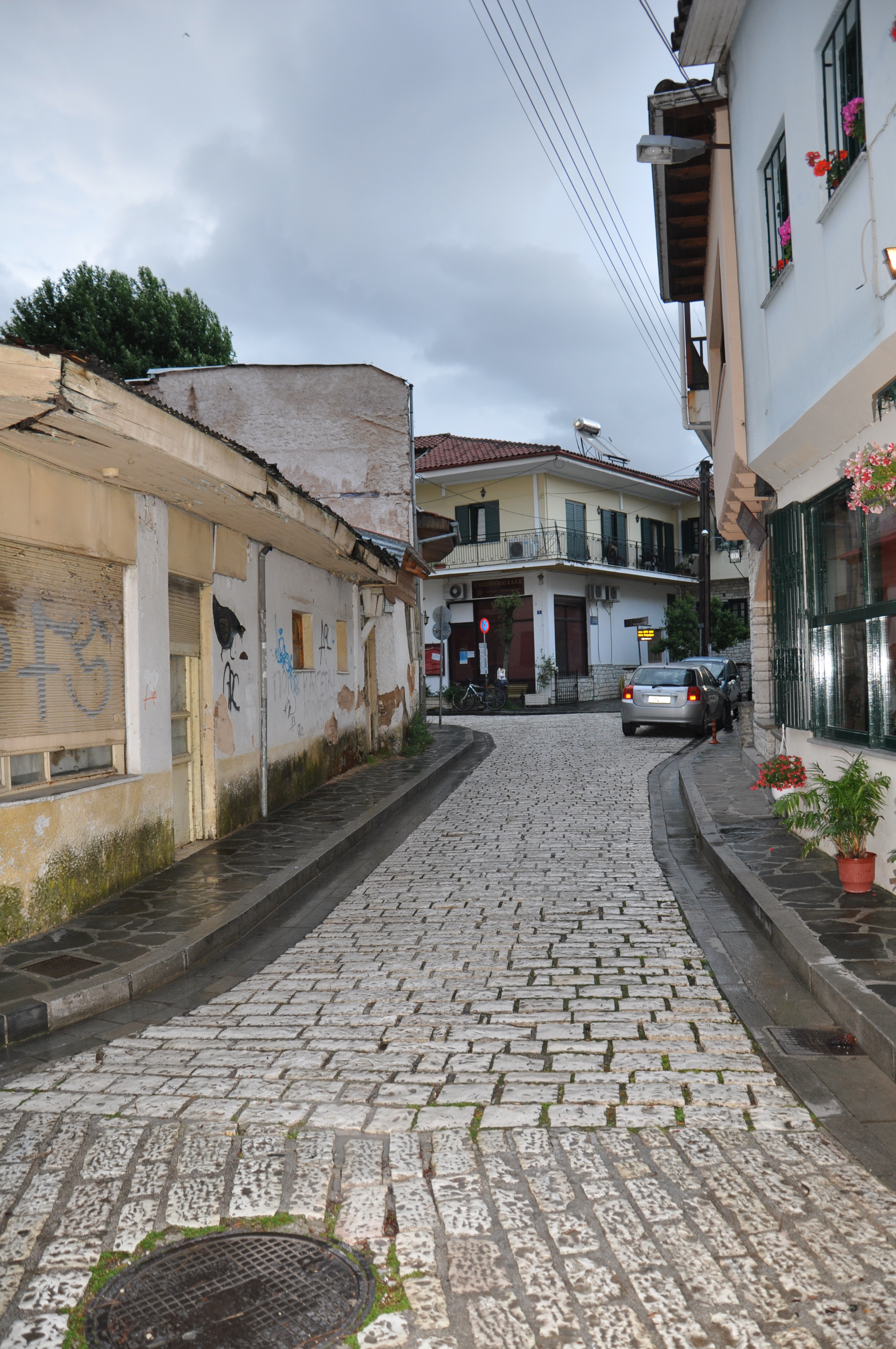
Street of the interior

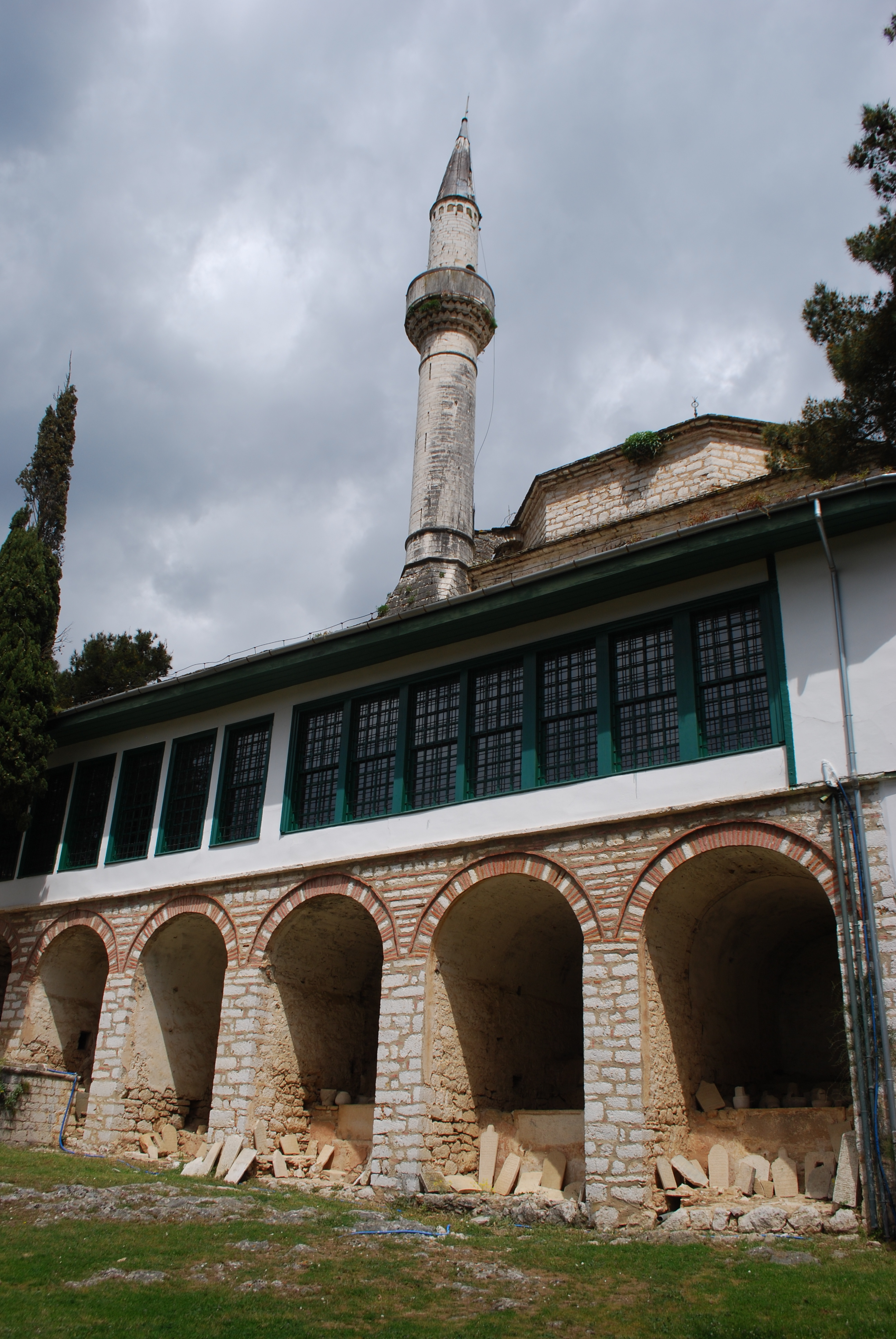
The Aslan Pasha Mosque, now a museum

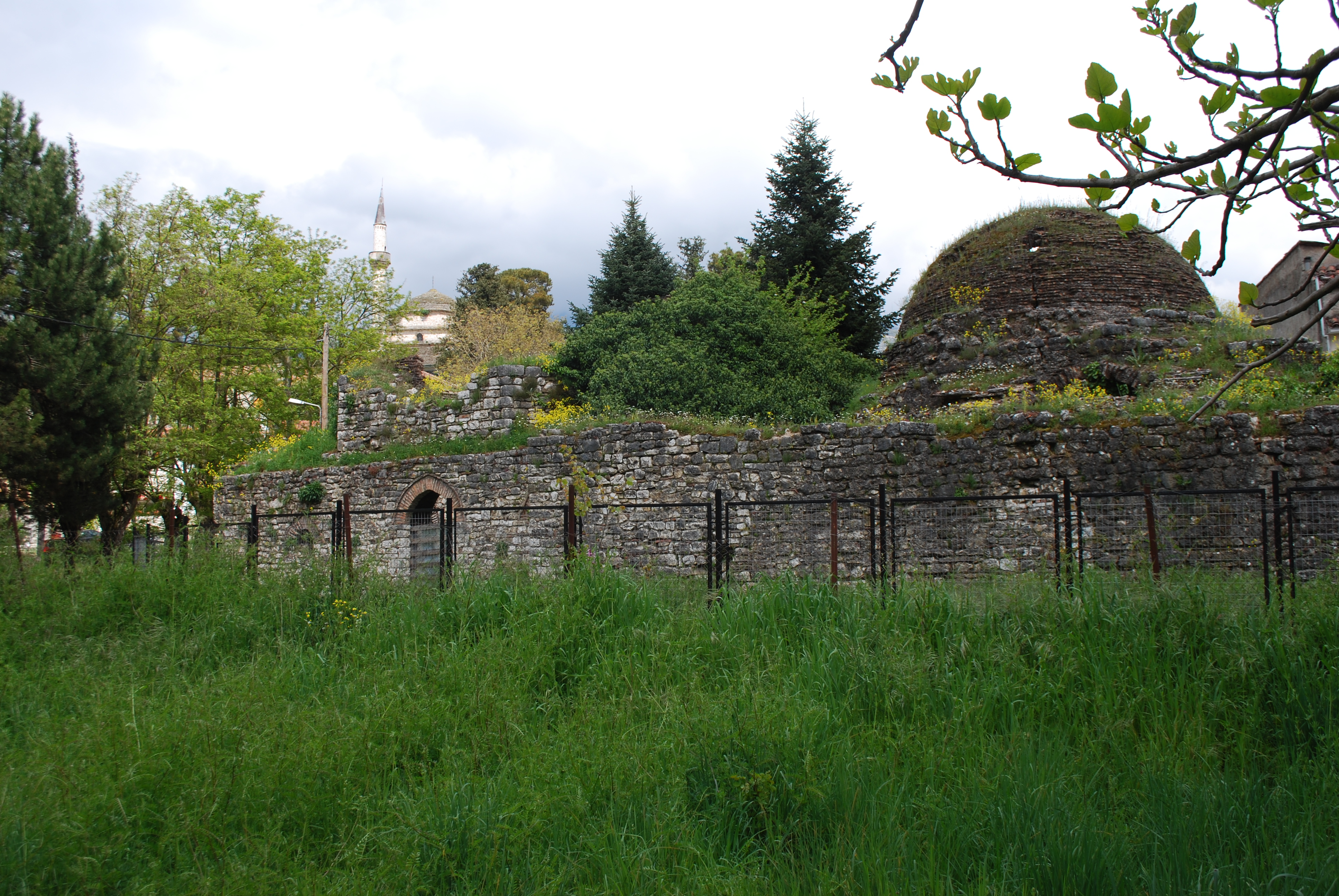
Ruins of the Ottoman Bath

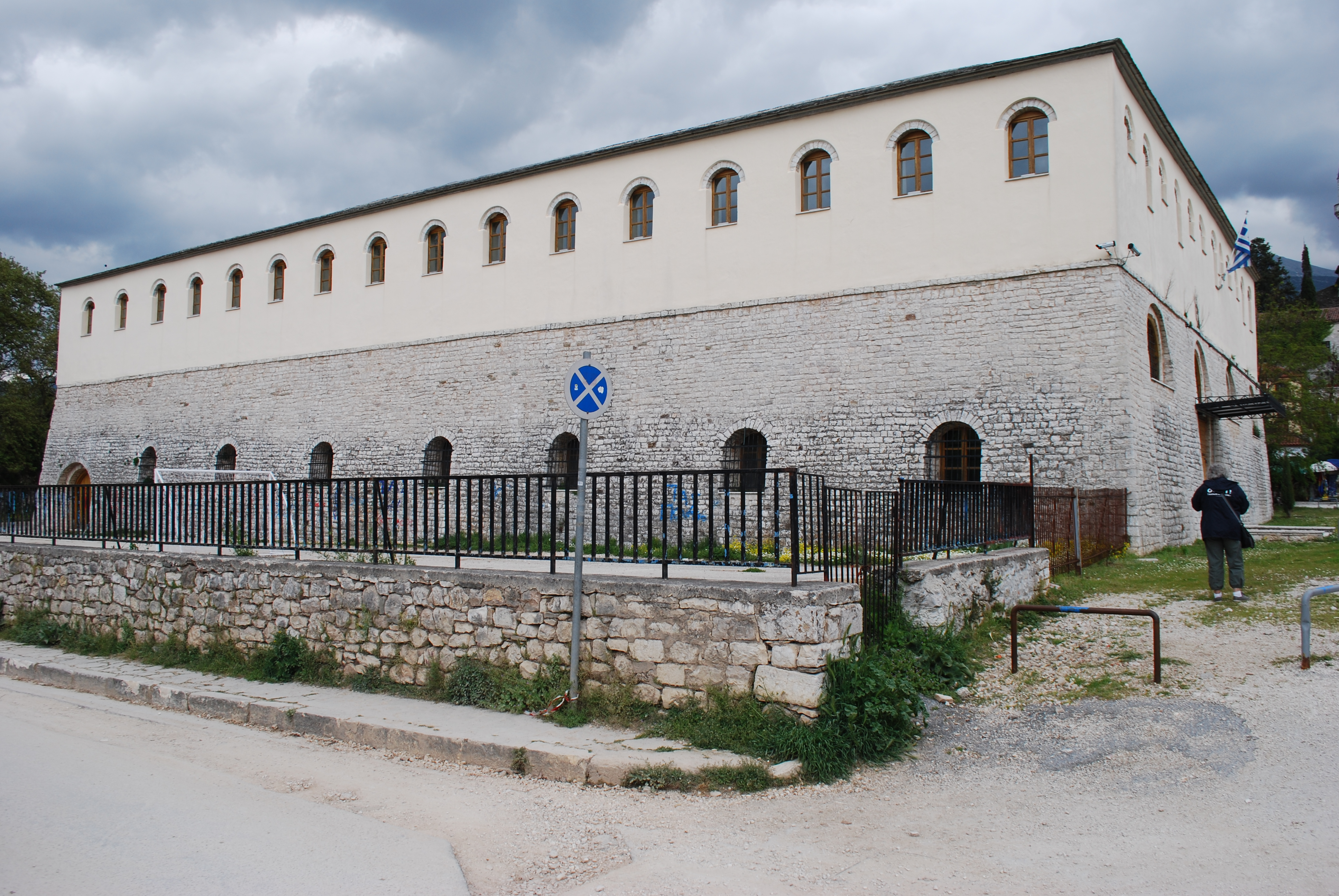
Soufari Sarai cavalry barracks

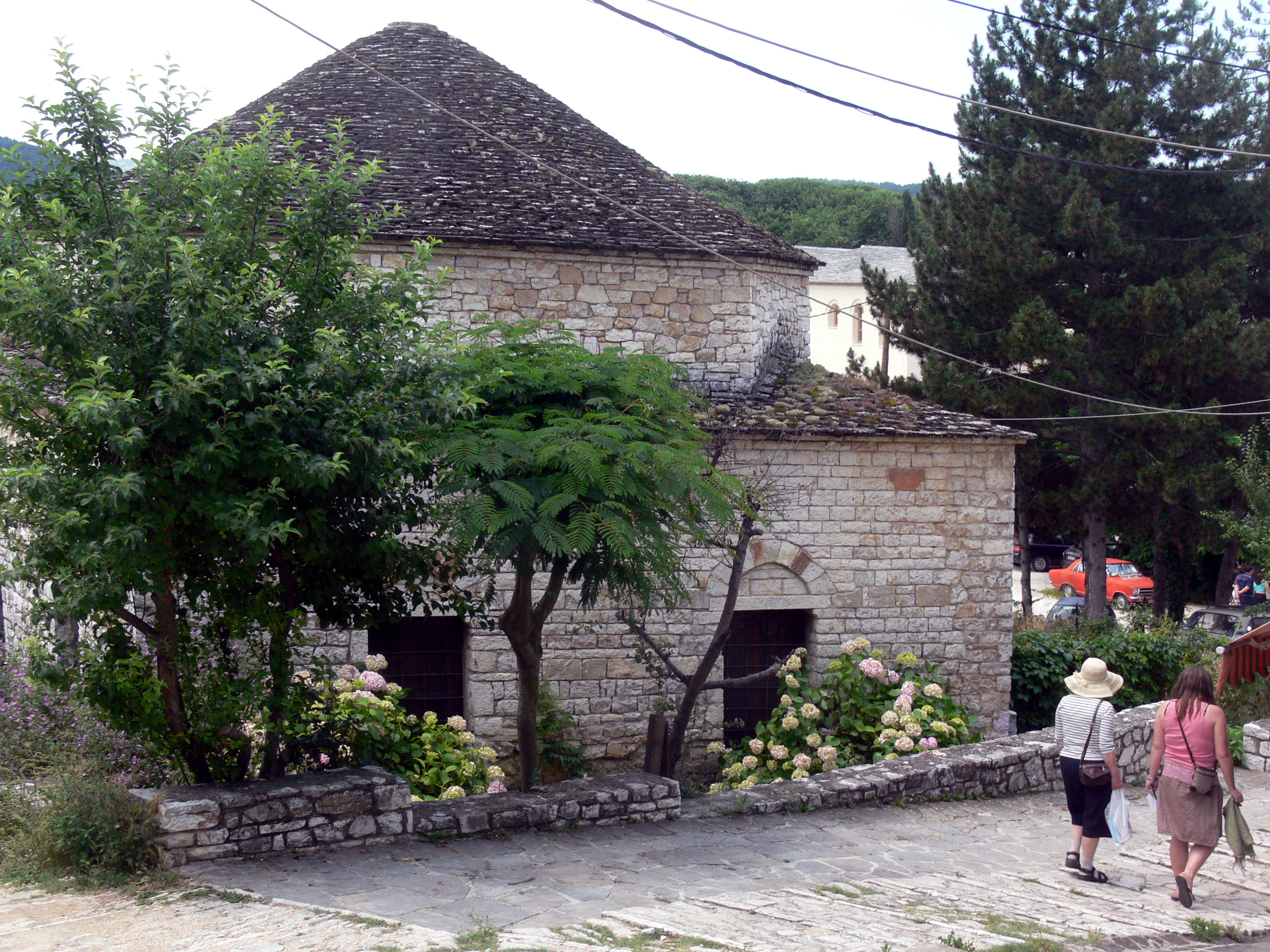
Ottoman library

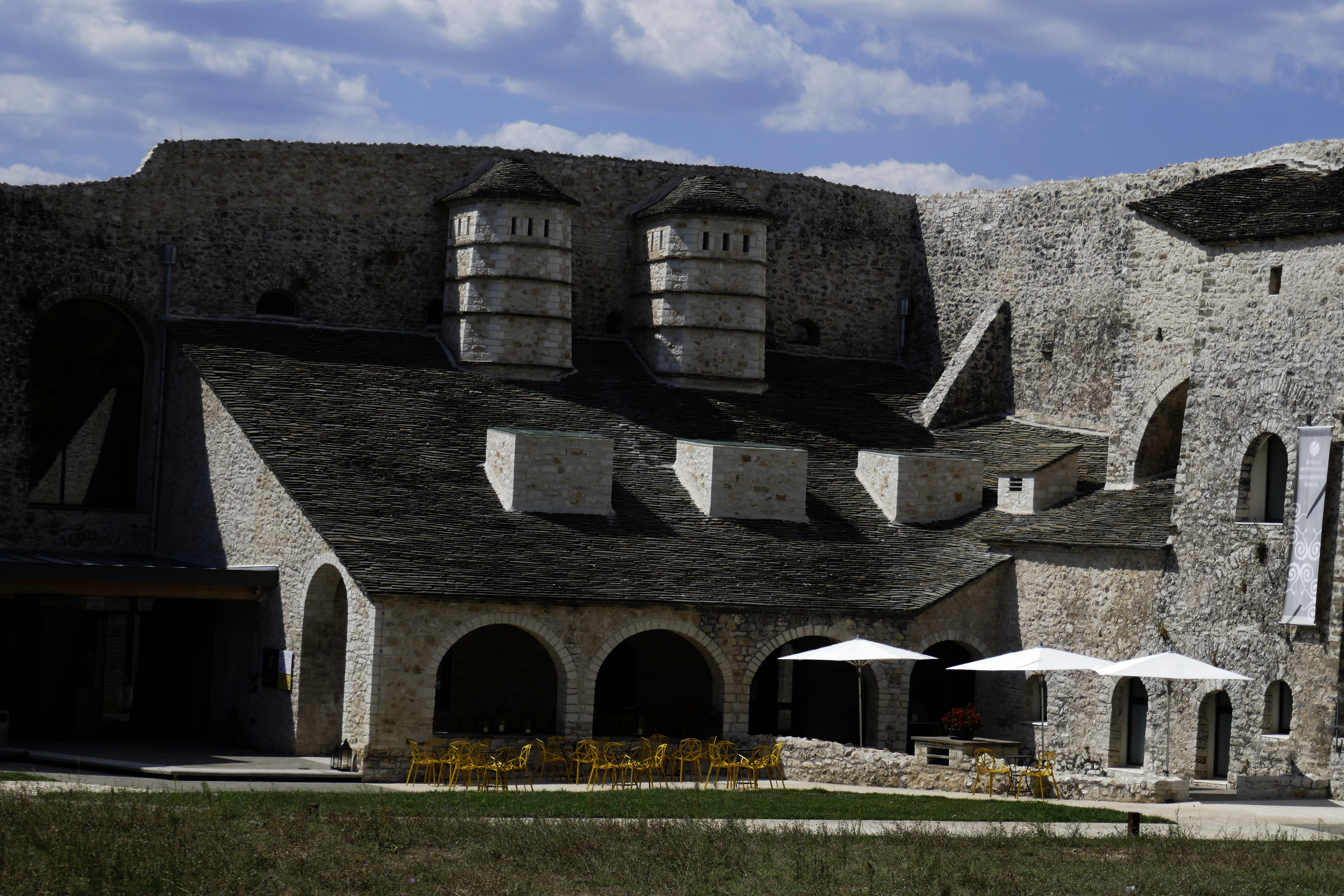
Silversmithing museum

=== Its Kale ===
The southeastern citadel, better known by its Ottoman name "Its Kale" (a Greek rendition of the proper Turkish iç Kale meaning "citadel"), forms essentially a separate fortress within the old town, covering an area of ca. 30,000 m^{2}. Traditionally its establishment has been ascribed to the occupation of the city by Bohemond in 1082, and the main Byzantine relic of the period, the large circular tower in the centre of the citadel, is known as the Tower of Bohemond. Here too, however, recent excavations have brought to light Hellenistic-era foundations. Literary sources record that in the Byzantine period, the citadel housed the residences of the city's archontes, as well as the cathedral church of the Taxiarches and the church of the Pantokrator.

Under Ali Pasha, the Its Kale was completely rebuilt and became the main residence of the powerful ruler. It was here that he built his palace (saray), beginning in 1788. The palace is described by European travellers and depicted in a print by W. L. Leitch and engraved by H. Adlard, as a large and complex two-storey structure with many windows giving excellent view to Lake Pamvotis. The palace continued to serve as the city's administrative centre until 1870 when it was torn down, although it had already been badly damaged during the 1821–22 siege by the Sultan's troops that brought about Ali's downfall. Excavations have shown that the selamlik was most likely located on the northern side, with the harem and the women's quarters on the southern. The surviving ruins belong mostly to the southern portion, including the ruins of the circular Tower of Bohemond.

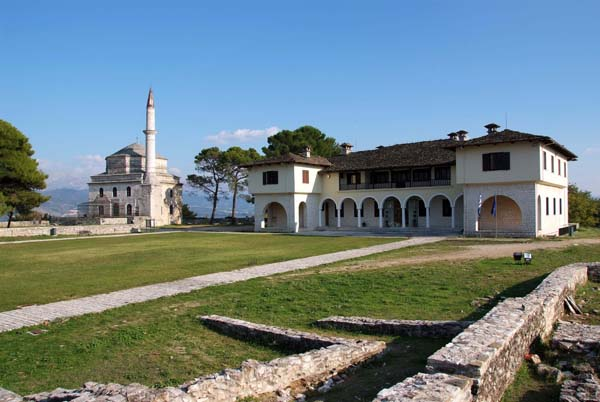
The Fethiye Mosque (left) and the Byzantine Museum (right)

After the Greek capture of the city in 1913, the site of the main palace complex was later used for the construction of the city's military hospital, which in turn gave way in 1958 to new building, designed by V. Harisis, intended to serve as a royal pavilion. Since 1995 this houses the Byzantine Museum of Ioannina. Next to the museum, on the easternmost and highest part of the citadel, lies the Fethiye Mosque with the tomb of Ali Pasha and one of his wives to the northwest, covered by an iron lattice work. The mosque occupies the space of the city's Byzantine-era cathedral, and was originally built after the Ottoman conquest in 1430. Rebuilt in grander style in the 17th century, its present form dates to its reconstruction by Ali Pasha c. 1795.

The main surviving part of Ali's palace is the so-called "Treasury" (Θησαυροφυλάκιο) to the north, a square building of unidentified use. A domed space adjacent to it was later converted into the small church of the Holy Unmercenaries (Άγιοι Ανάργυροι). The Treasury was restored in 1989–90 and houses an exhibition on the history and methods of silversmithing in Ioannina and its wider area, for which the region was famous in Ottoman times. In 2016, the citadel's dedication to this local craft was significantly expanded with the opening of the Silversmithing Museum of Ioannina, operated by the Piraeus Bank Group Cultural Foundation (PIOP). It is housed in the fully restored western bastion of the Its Kale acropolis. Other surviving or excavated structures are the kitchens, dating to the early 19th century, located in the northwestern part of the citadel, which now serve as a refectory; the gunpowder store to the northeast of the Fethiye Mosque, which today serves as an educational space, with a ruined building of unknown purpose between it and the kitchens, as well as the ruined base of another large Byzantine-era circular tower; a large two-storey building northeast of the Treasury, possibly a barracks or an unidentified part of the palace, which survives only in half its original length, and now serves as a cultural and exhibition space; and a small bath complex to the north.

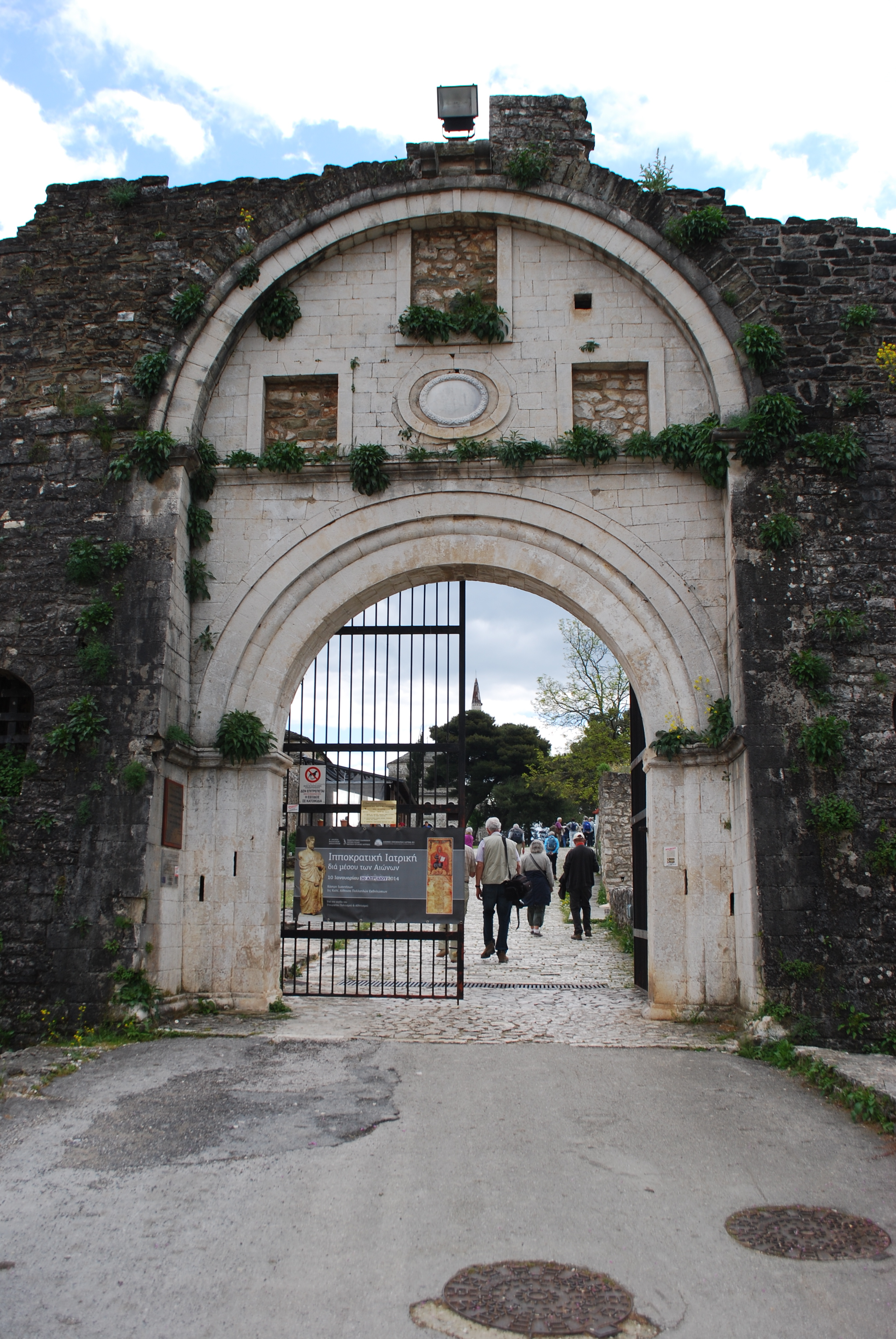
Main gate of the Its Kale

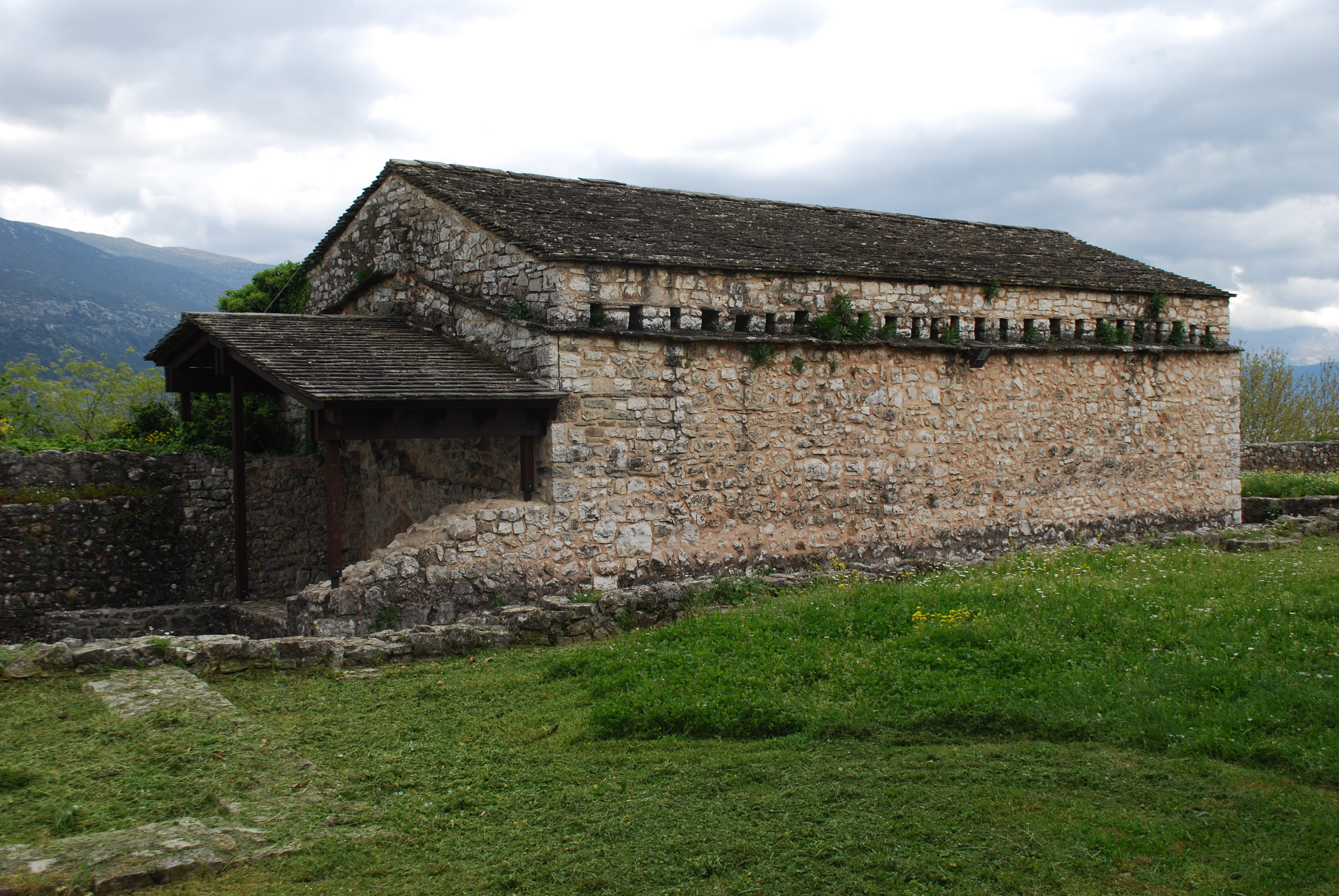
Gunpowder store

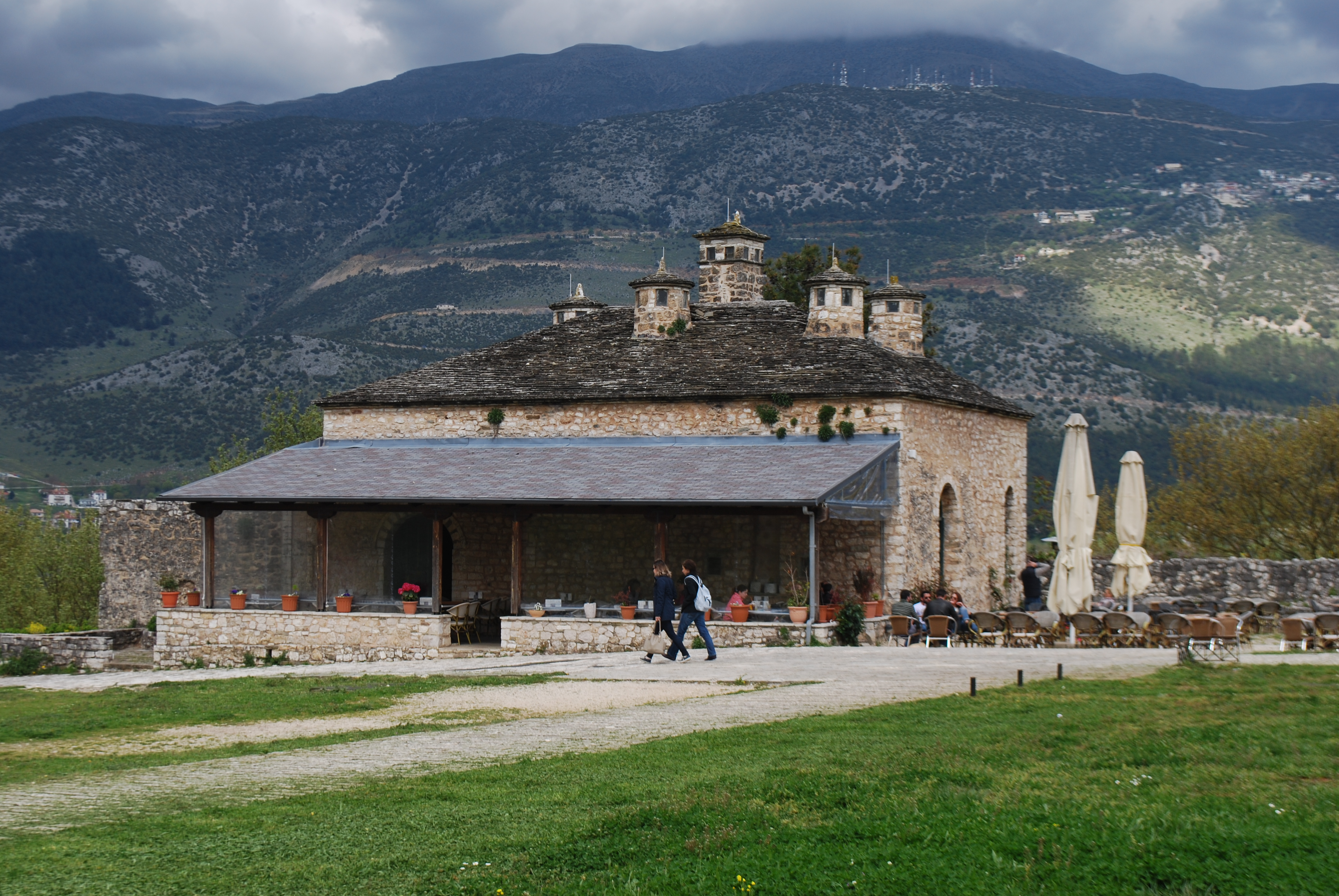
The palace kitchens

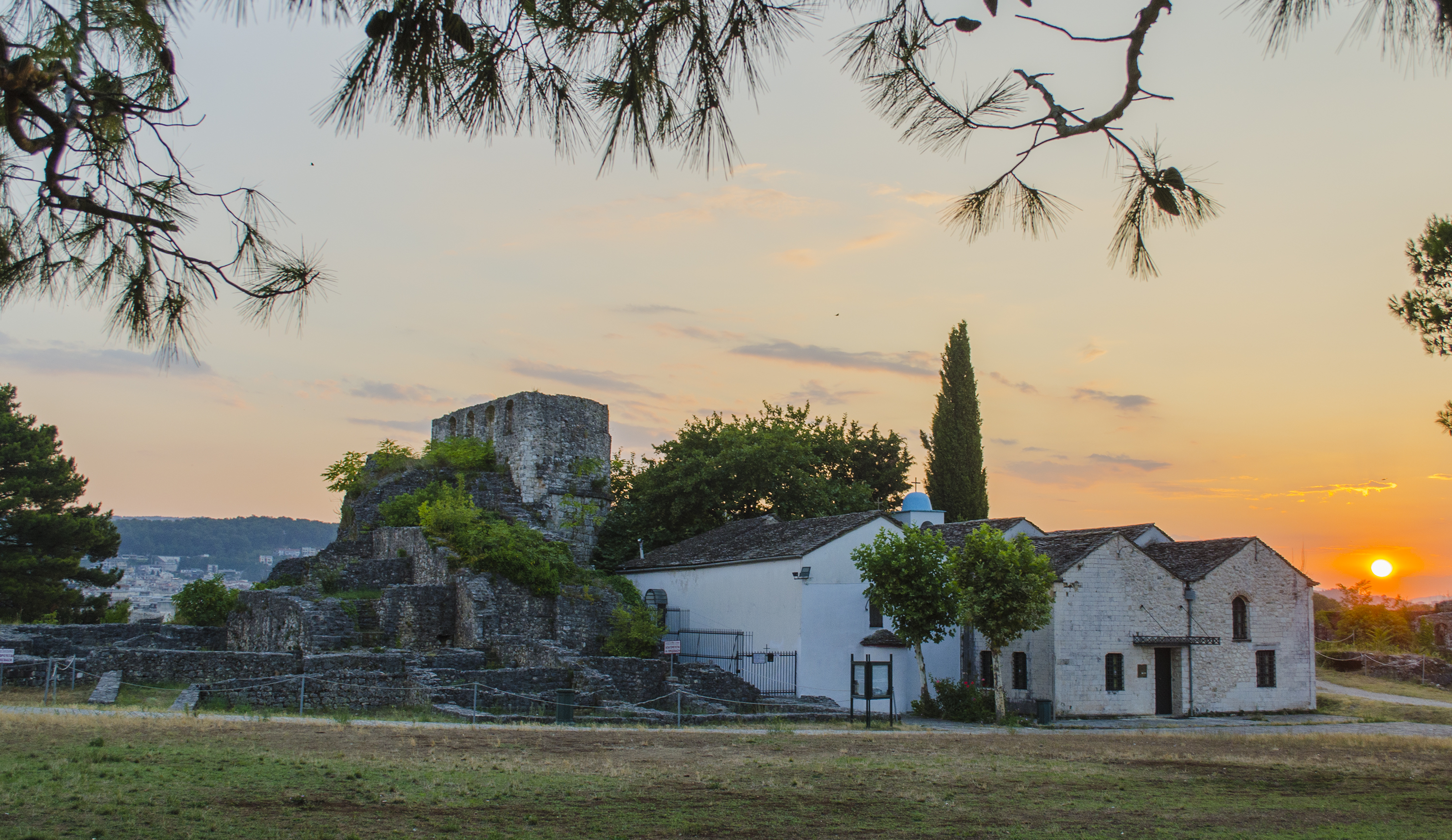
Ruins of Ali Pasha's palace, and the Tower of Bohemond

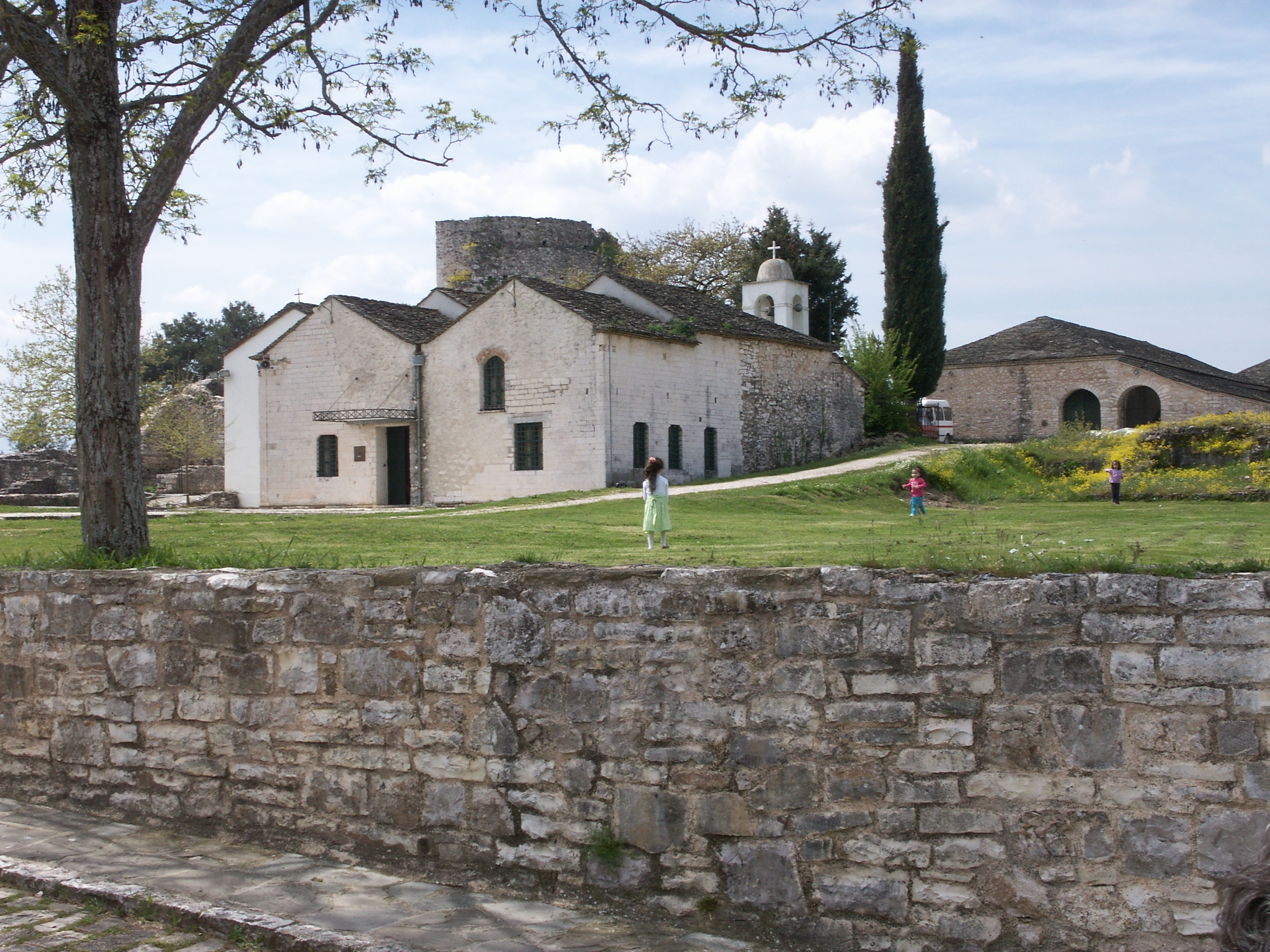
The so-called Treasury (right) and the Church of the Holy Unmercenaries (left)

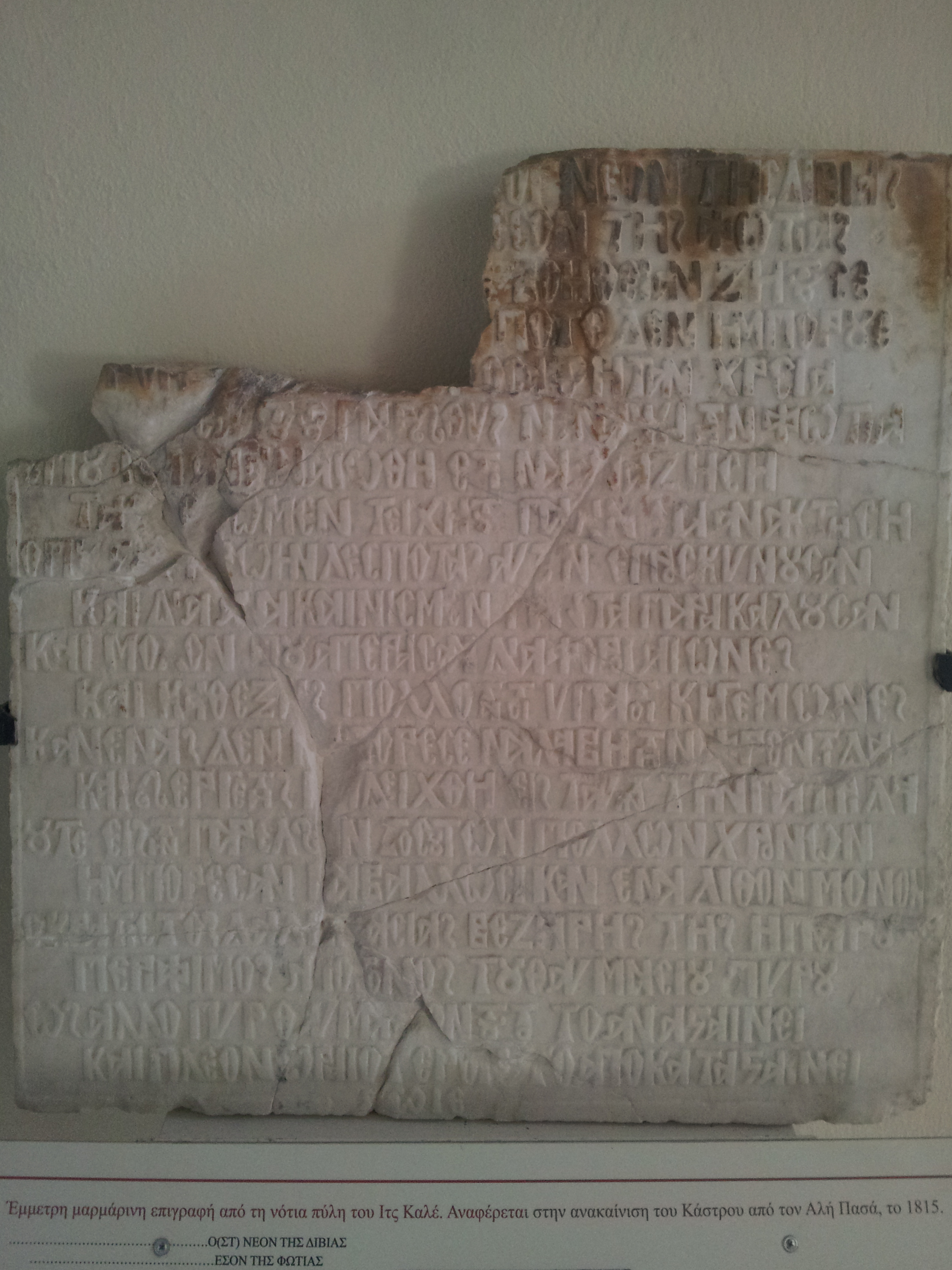
Inscription commemorating the rebuilding of Its Kale by Ali Pasha, 1815

== See also ==
- Ali Pasha of Ioannina

== Sources ==
- Anastassiadou, Meropi (2002). "Yanya". The Encyclopedia of Islam, New Edition, Volume XI: W–Z. Leiden and New York: BRILL. pp. 282–283. ISBN 90-04-12756-9.
- Gregory, Timothy E. (1991). "Ioannina". In Kazhdan, Alexander (ed.). The Oxford Dictionary of Byzantium. Oxford University Press. p. 1006. ISBN 978-0-19-504652-6.
- Papadopoulou, Varvara N., ed. (2014). Μουσεία στο Κάστρο Ιωαννίνων, Παράλληλες Διαδρομές (in Greek). Hellenic Ministry of Culture, 8th Ephorate of Byzantine Antiquities.
