= Soufari Sarai =

Coordinates: 39.6730°N 20.8590°E

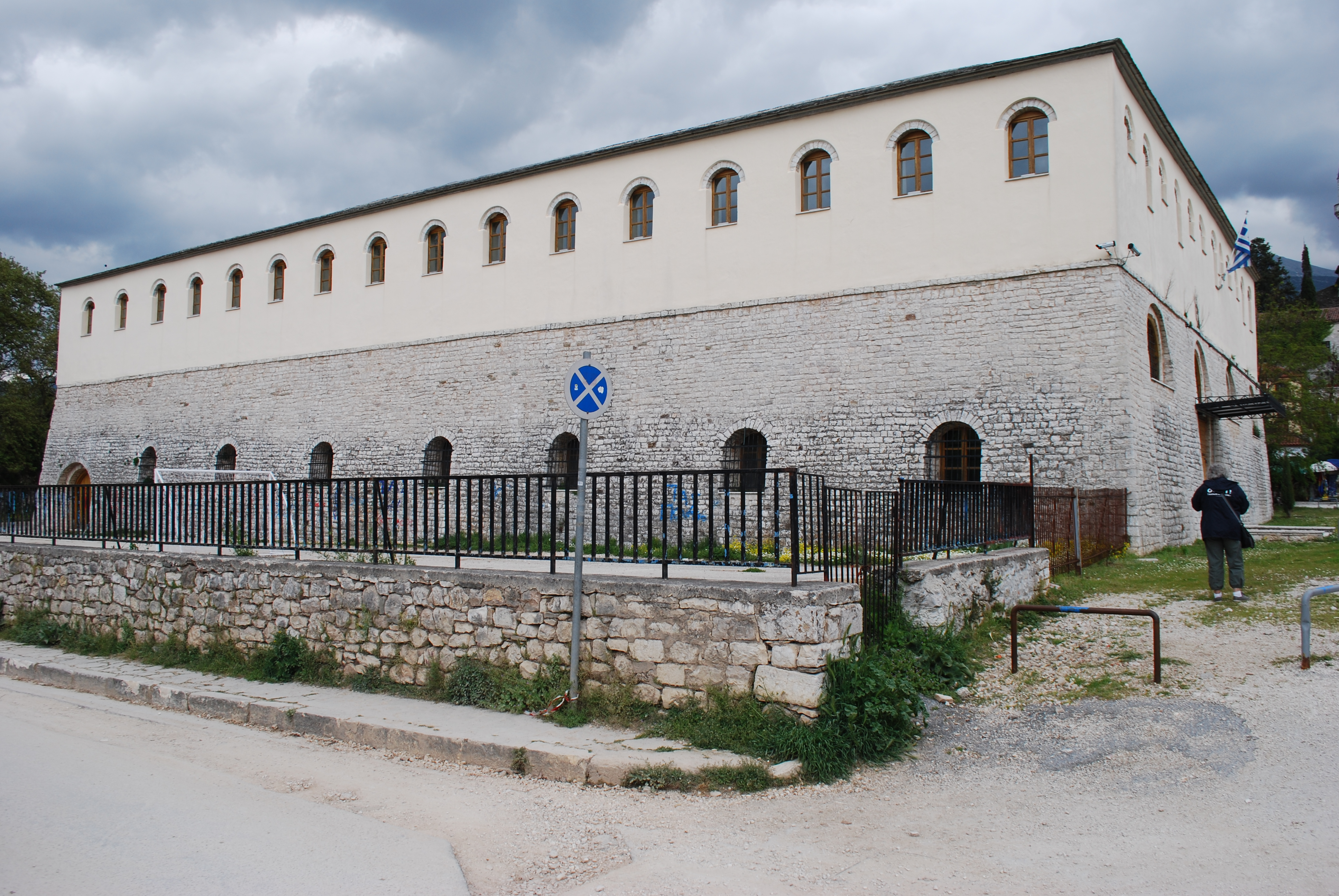
View of the Soufari Sarai

Soufari Sarai (Greek: Σουφαρί Σαράι) is a large historical building in the castle of Ioannina, Greece. It was used by the Ottomans as a cavalry school. It is located on the north side of the Castle, near the Turkish Library. It is a large rectangular building with two floors of 980 square metres (10,500 sq ft) each. It was built between 1815 and 1820 by Ali Pasha. It has been restored, and is used by the State Archives.
