= Placolecis =

Scientific classification
- Domain: Eukaryota
- Kingdom: Fungi
- Division: Ascomycota
- Class: Lecanoromycetes
- Order: Lecanorales
- Family: Catillariaceae
- Genus: Placolecis; Trevis. (1857)

Species
- P. kunmingensis P. loekoesiana P. opaca P. sublaevis

Synonyms
- Astroplaca Bagl. (1857)

Genus of lichens

Placolecis is a genus of lichen-forming fungi in the family Catillariaceae. It has four species of saxicolous (rock-dwelling) and crustose lichens. The genus was circumscribed by Italian botanist Vittore Benedetto Antonio Trevisan de Saint-Léon in 1857. He did not assign a type species for the genus. Josef Hafellner designated a lectotype for Placolecis balanina in 1984, but subsequently, this taxon was folded into P. opaca.

== Species ==
- Placolecis kunmingensis A.C.Yin & Li S.Wang (2019) – China
- Placolecis loekoesiana (S.Y.Kondr., Farkas, J.J.Woo & Hur) A.C.Yin (2019)
- Placolecis opaca (Dufour) Hafellner (1984)
- Placolecis sublaevis A.C.Yin & Li S.Wang (2019) – China

The taxon once known as Placolecis plumbea (Lightf.) Trevis. (1857) is now considered synonymous with Pectenia plumbea.
