= Fethiye Mosque (Ioannina) =

Former mosque in Ioannina, Greece

- Φετιχιέ τζαμί
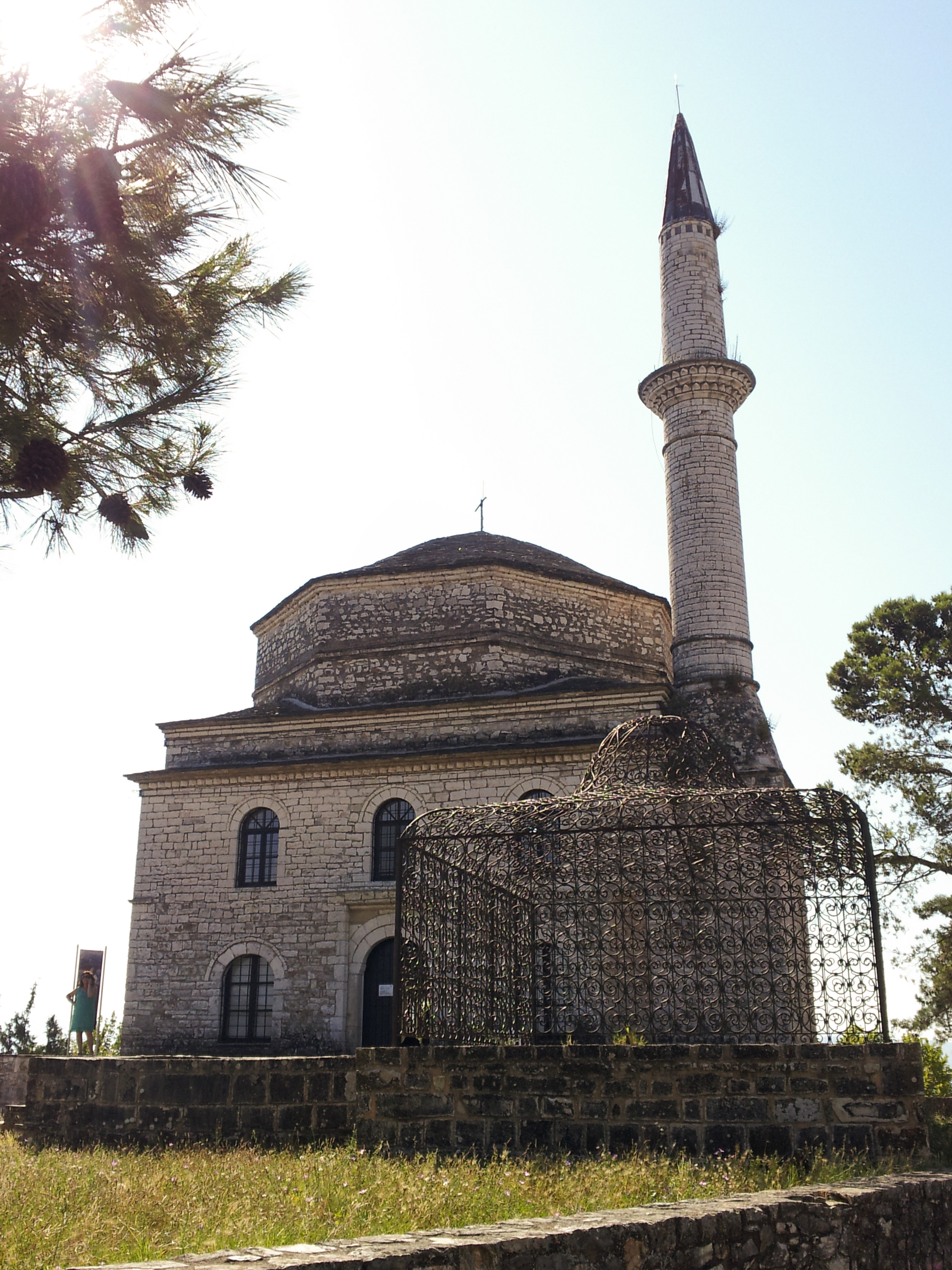

- Location of the former mosque in Greece

Religion
- Affiliation: Islam (former)
- Ecclesiastical or organizational status: Mosque (1611–1820s)
- Status: Abandoned (as a mosque)

Location
- Location: Ioannina, Epirus
- Country: Greece
- Interactive map of Fethiye Mosque
- Coordinates: 39°40′14″N 20°51′47″E

Architecture
- Type: Mosque
- Style: Ottoman
- Completed: 1430 (original); 1611 (current); 1795 (remodelled)

Specifications
- Dome: 1
- Minaret: 1

The Fethiye Mosque (Greek: Φετιχιέ τζαμί, Albanian: Xhamia e Feties, from Turkish: Fethiye Camii, lit. 'mosque of the conquest') is a former mosque in Ioannina, in the Epirus region of northwest Greece. The first mosque structure was completed in 1430; yet the current structure predominantly dates from 1611, during the Ottoman era, and was extensively renovated in 1795. The mosque was abandoned in the 1820s.

== Overview ==
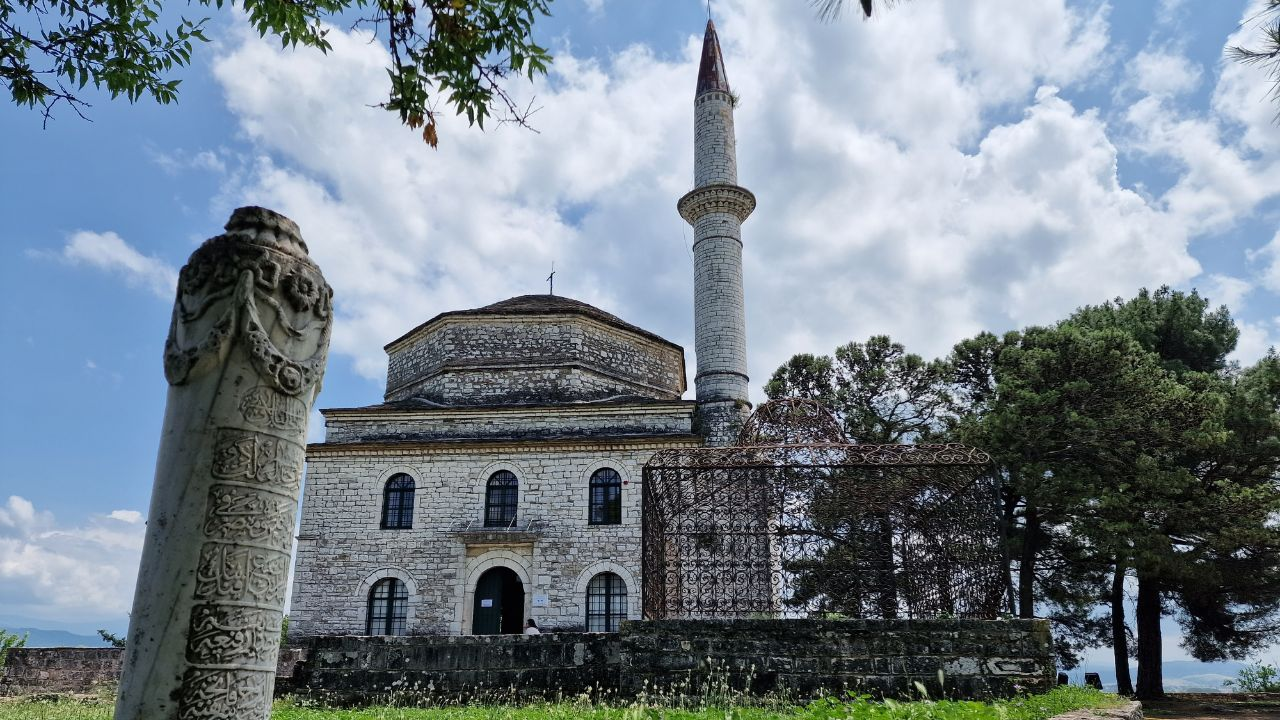
The mosque inside Ioannina Castle.

The mosque was built in the city's inner castle (Its Kale) immediately after the conquest by the Ottomans in 1430, near the ruins of an early 13th-century Byzantine church dedicated to the Archangels Michael and Gabriel.

Originally it was a wooden structure, which was replaced in 1611 by a stone building. It was extensively remodelled in 1795 by Ali Pashë Tepelena, who made it the main mosque of his palace. The graves of Ali's family and of Ali himself are located before the mosque.

== See also ==
- Islam in Greece
- List of former mosques in Greece
- Ottoman Greece
