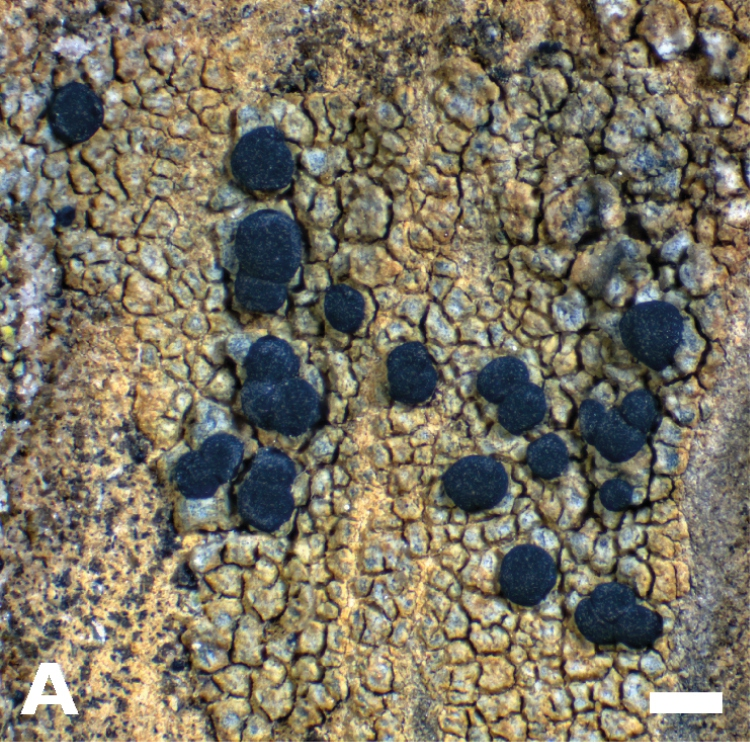
- Catillaria scotinodes

Scientific classification
- Kingdom: Fungi
- Division: Ascomycota
- Class: Lecanoromycetes
- Order: Lecanorales
- Family: Catillariaceae
- Genus: Catillaria; A.Massal. (1852)

Type species
- Catillaria chalybeia (Borrer) A.Massal. (1852)

Synonyms
- Catillaria A.Massal. ex R.Sant. (1952); Lecidea [unranked] Catillaria Ach. (1803); Microlecia M.Choisy (1949); Ulocodium A.Massal. (1855)

= Catillaria =

Genus of lichen

Catillaria is a genus of crustose lichens in the family Catillariaceae. The genus was circumscribed by Italian lichenologist Abramo Bartolommeo Massalongo in 1852. It is the type genus of Catillariaceae, which was circumscribed by Austrian lichenologist Josef Hafellner in 1984.

== Description ==
Catillaria typically grows as a thin, crust-like layer (crustose) on various surfaces. The fungal body (thallus) can appear in several forms – it may be barely visible, cracked, warty, or divided into small polygonal areas called areoles. These lichens display various colours including white, grey, green, brown, or black, though some species that grow on other lichens may lack a visible thallus entirely.

Like all lichens, Catillaria represents a symbiotic partnership between a fungus and photosynthetic algae (known as the photobiont). In this genus, the algal partners are green algae, specifically from genera such as Dictyochloropsis, Myrmecia, or Trebouxia. The fungal portion lacks a protective outer layer (cortex) or has only a rudimentary one.

The reproductive structures (apothecia) are black and typically lack a powdery coating (pruina). They have a distinctive microscopic structure, including specialised cells called paraphyses that have abruptly swollen tips capped with dark brown pigmentation. The spore-producing cells (asci) typically contain eight spores, though occasionally up to 16, and show a characteristic blue reaction when treated with iodine-based stains. The spores themselves are colourless and divided into two cells by a single wall (septum), without any surrounding gelatinous sheath.

The genus can be distinguished from similar lichens by its combination of asci that turn blue with iodine, paraphyses with dark-capped swollen tips, two-celled spores without a gelatinous coating, and spore-producing cells arranged in chains. While the similar genus Halecania shares many of these features, it differs in having thick-walled spores with a distinct gelatinous coating and is not closely related based on genetic analysis. When analyzed chemically using thin-layer chromatography, these lichens do not show evidence of specialised lichen products.

== Species ==
As of February 2025, Species Fungorum (in the Catalogue of Life) accept 53 species of Catillaria.

- Catillaria alboflavicans (Müll.Arg.) Zahlbr. (1926)
- Catillaria aphana (Nyl.) Coppins (1989)
- Catillaria atomarioides (Müll.Arg.) H.Kilias (1981)
- Catillaria australica Räsänen (1944)
- Catillaria austrolittoralis Kantvilas & van den Boom (2013)
- Catillaria baliola (Nyl.) Orange (2022)
- Catillaria banksiae (Müll.Arg.) Zahlbr. (1926)
- Catillaria brisbanensis Räsänen (1949)
- Catillaria chalybeia (Borrer) A.Massal. (1852)
- Catillaria croceella (Nyl.) Zahlbr. (Nyl.) Zahlbr. (1926)
- Catillaria distorta Körb. (1862)
- Catillaria effugiens (Müll.Arg.) Zahlbr. (1926)
- Catillaria erysiboides (Nyl.) Th.Fr. (1874)
- Catillaria flavicans (Müll.Arg.) Zahlbr. (1926)
- Catillaria flexuosa van den Boom & Alvarado (2021) – the Netherlands
- Catillaria frenchiana (Müll.Arg.) Zahlbr. (1926)
- Catillaria fungoides Etayo & van den Boom (2001) – Africa; Asia; Europe
- Catillaria gerroana P.M.McCarthy & Elix (2017) – Australia
- Catillaria gilbertii Fryday & Coppins (1996) – Scotland
- Catillaria glaucogrisea Fryday (2004)
- Catillaria glauconigrans (Tuck.) Hasse (1909)
- Catillaria golubkovae Kotlov (2002)
- Catillaria grossulina (Stirt.) Zahlbr. (1926)
- Catillaria japonica Zhurb. & Hafellner (2020)
- Catillaria laevigata P.M.McCarthy & Elix (2018) – Australia
- Catillaria lenticularis (Ach.) Th.Fr. (1874)
- Catillaria lobariicola (Alstrup) Coppins & Aptroot (2008)
- Catillaria mediterranea Hafellner (1983)
- Catillaria melaclina (Nyl.) Zahlbr. (1926)
- Catillaria melaclinoides (Müll.Arg.) Zahlbr. (1926)
- Catillaria minuta (Schaer.) Lettau (1912)
- Catillaria modesta (Müll.Arg.) Coppins (1989)
- Catillaria mycophila (Müll.Arg.) Zahlbr. (1926)
- Catillaria nigroclavata (Nyl.) J.Steiner (1898) – China; Taiwan
- Catillaria nigroisidiata van den Boom (2002) – Europe
- Catillaria patteeana D.P.Waters & Lendemer (2019) – USA
- Catillaria phaeoloma (C.Knight) Zahlbr. (1926)
- Catillaria picila (A.Massal.) Coppins (1989)
- Catillaria reichertiana Galun (1967) – Israel
- Catillaria rimosa Zahlbr. (1926)
- Catillaria rudolphii C.W.Dodge (1955)
- Catillaria scleroplaca (Müll.Arg.) Zahlbr. (1926)
- Catillaria scotinodes (Nyl.) Coppins (1989)
- Catillaria stereocaulorum (Th.Fr.) H.Olivier (1905)
- Catillaria subfuscata (Nyl.) Zahlbr. (1926)
- Catillaria subpraedicta M.Brand & van den Boom (2010) – Canary Islands
- Catillaria subviridis (Nyl.) Zahlbr. (1926)
- Catillaria tasmanica Räsänen (1944)
- Catillaria tenuilimbata (C.Knight) Zahlbr. (1926)
- Catillaria trachonoides (Nyl.) Zahlbr. (1926)
- Catillaria ulleungdoensis S.Y.Kondr., Lőkös & Hur (2016) – South Korea
- Catillaria umbratilis Jatta (1911)
- Catillaria usneicola Etayo (2000)
- Catillaria vandenberghenii Sérus. (1983) – Zimbabwe
