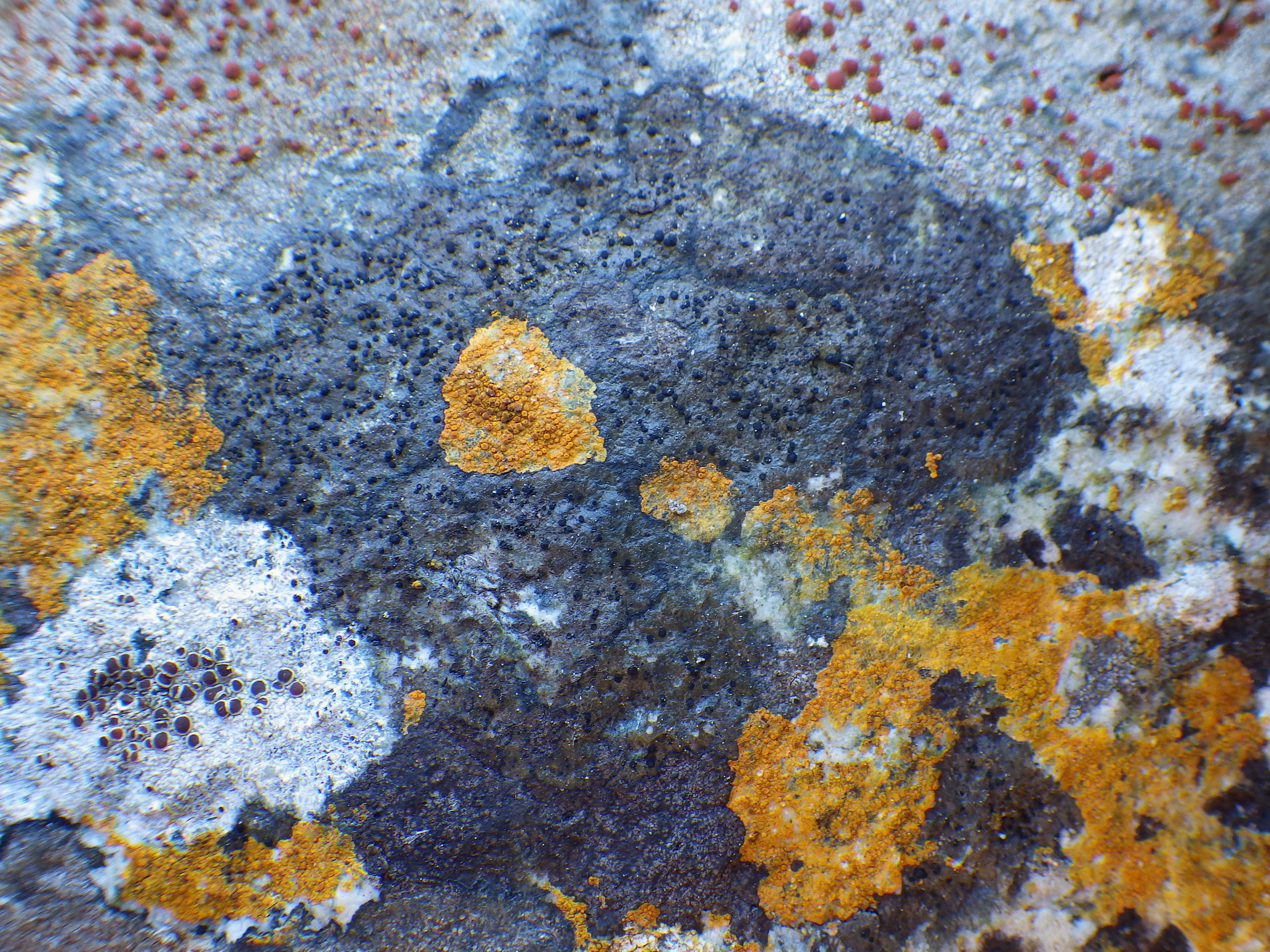
- Catillaria chalybeia, growing on granite in Portugal

Scientific classification
- Kingdom: Fungi
- Division: Ascomycota
- Class: Lecanoromycetes
- Order: Lecanorales
- Family: Catillariaceae; Hafellner (1984)

Type genus
- Catillaria A.Massal. (1852)

Genera
- Austrolecia; Catillaria; Placolecis; Solenopsora; Xanthopsorella

= Catillariaceae =

Family of lichens

The Catillariaceae are a family of crustose lichens in the order Lecanorales. Species of this family have a widespread distribution, especially in temperate areas. The family contains five genera and about 130 species, most of which form crusty growths tightly attached to rocks, bark, or soil.

== Taxonomy ==
The family was circumscribed by the Austrian lichenologist Josef Hafellner in 1984.

== Description ==
Members of Catillariaceae have a very variable body (thallus). Most are crust-forming lichens that stick tightly to the substrate, sometimes splitting into a network of cracks (rimose), breaking up into little warts or blocks (areolate), forming small scales, or spreading with a rosette-like edge (placodioid). A few are fruticose, meaning they grow as small, branched tufts. In some taxa the thallus is partly sunk into the substrate or so thin that it fades away; lichenicolous species that live on other lichens may lack a thallus altogether. The photosynthetic partner is a simple green alga with small, spherical cells (a chlorococcoid photobiont).

The fruiting bodies are apothecia, usually brown to black and typically without a frosted coating (pruina). A rim made from the thallus (the thalline margin) may be absent from the start, or present when young but later pushed aside as the disc expands. The true margin of the apothecium (the exciple) is well developed in most species, at least in young stages; it is made of radiating, branched fungal threads and holds together firmly, including in standard chemical tests used by lichenologists. Inside the disc, the tissue between the spore-bearing sacs (the hamathecium) consists of straight or only slightly branched threads (paraphyses) whose tips are abruptly swollen and capped with dark brown pigment.

The asci (spore sacs) usually contain eight spores (occasionally up to sixteen) and are cylindrical to club-shaped. They show a characteristic Catillaria-type reaction in the iodine–potassium test used in microscopy: a blue outer coat and a uniformly blue dome at the tip, and in some cases a small clear ocular chamber is visible at the apex. The ascospores are typically colourless, divided by a single cross-wall (1-septate), and lack any gelatinous outer sheath. Asexual reproductive structures (pycnidia) are common but often hard to see because they are sunk into the thallus; they produce colourless, non-septate conidia (asexual spores) that are ellipsoidal to rod-shaped. The conidia arise from producing cells that may be linked in chains with spores budding from the ends and sides, or arranged in a single layer of broadly flask-shaped cells.

== Genera ==
Catillariaceae contains 5 genera and about 130 species.

- Austrolecia Hertel (1984) – 1 species
- Catillaria A.Massal. (1852) – about 100 species
- Placolecis Trevis. (1857) – 5 species
- Solenopsora A.Massal. (1855) – 25 species
- Xanthopsorella Kalb & Hafellner (1984) – 1 species
