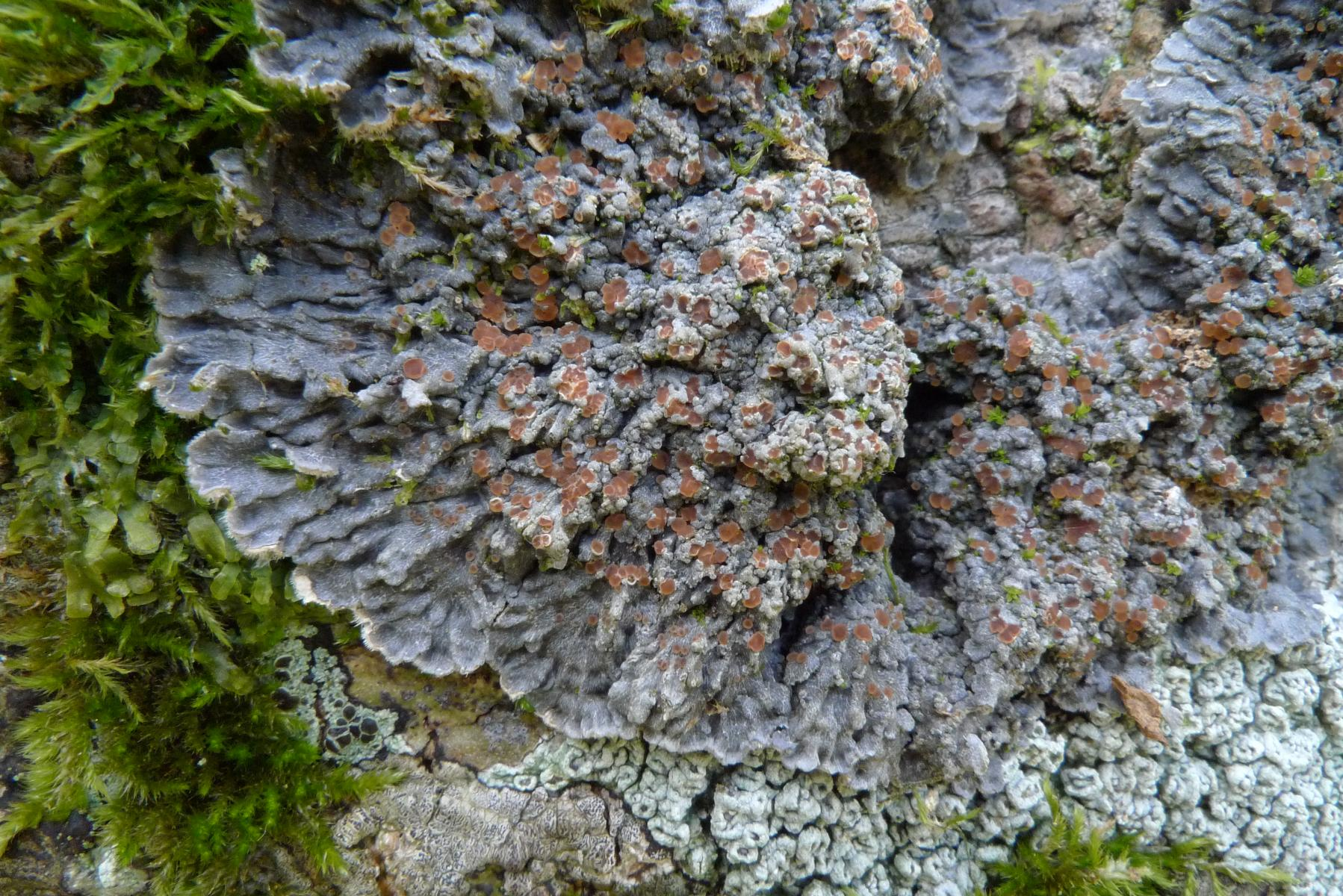
- Pectenia plumbea

Scientific classification
- Kingdom: Fungi
- Division: Ascomycota
- Class: Lecanoromycetes
- Order: Peltigerales
- Family: Pannariaceae
- Genus: Pectenia; P.M.Jørg., L.Lindblom, Wedin & S.Ekman (2014)

Type species
- Pectenia plumbea (Lightf.) P.M.Jørg., L.Lindblom, Wedin & S.Ekman (2014)

Species
- P. atlantica P. cyanoloma P. ligulata P. plumbea

Synonyms
- Degelia sect. Amphiloma (Fr.) P.M.Jørg. & P.James (1990)

= Pectenia =

Genus of lichen-forming fungi

Pectenia is a genus of lichen-forming fungi in the family Pannariaceae. It comprises four species. The genus was established in 2014 when DNA studies showed that a group of thick, bluish-grey lichens previously classified in the genus Degelia actually represented a separate evolutionary lineage. Pectenia species are characterized by their rigid, scallop-like surface texture and circular growth pattern. These lichens are found primarily in Atlantic-influenced regions of Europe and North Africa, with one species also occurring in northeastern North America. The genus partners with cyanobacteria from the genus Nostoc and produces abundant brown fruiting bodies on the lichen surface.

== Taxonomy ==
In 2014, Per Magnus Jørgensen, Louise Lindblom, Mats Wedin and Stefan Ekman formally set up Pectenia as a new genus for the Degelia sect. Amphiloma group (the D. plumbea group) after wider DNA sampling showed Degelia was not a single natural group. Analyses of three genes placed the ‘‘Amphiloma’’ group as a separate branch within Pannariaceae, supporting its treatment as a distinct genus. Four new combinations were made in the protologue: Pectenia plumbea (type), P. atlantica, P. cyanoloma and P. ligulata.

They used the name Pectenia instead of Amphiloma because Amphiloma had already been used for other organisms; Pectenia was introduced as a new name for the group, with P. plumbea designated as the type species. In diagnosis, Pectenia features thick, bluish-grey, flat rosettes with lobed edges (often with shallow grooves), partners with Nostoc, and commonly bears brown, disc-like fruiting bodies on the surface; the spore layer turns blue in iodine and the spore sacs have a dark, iodine-reactive cap. The protologue also notes that the genus is chiefly Atlantic European (with extensions to adjacent North Africa), while P. plumbea has an additional, restricted presence in north-eastern North America. The same study's tree places Pectenia in Clade 1 of Pannariaceae, apart from Degelia (in the strict sense).

Index Fungorum currently treats Pectenia as an illegitimate name under the botanical code, arguing that the older name Amphiloma should have been adopted and that the 2014 paper did not cite the replaced synonym as the rules require. In practice, recent systematic literature has continued to use Pectenia following Ekman et al. 2014, which explicitly avoided Amphiloma because of earlier homonyms.

Subsequent multilocus genetic analyses sampling material across Europe and North Africa used multiple genetic markers to determine how many distinct species exist in the genus and where they occur geographically. Two main lineages were identified, plumbea and atlantica, with two geographic sub-lineages within atlantica. On balance the authors recommended recognising two species separated chiefly by lobe architecture, rather than four morphospecies. As the two atlantica-lineage clades lacked consistent morphological differences, the authors recommended treating the complex as two species distinguished chiefly by lobe architecture.

== Description ==
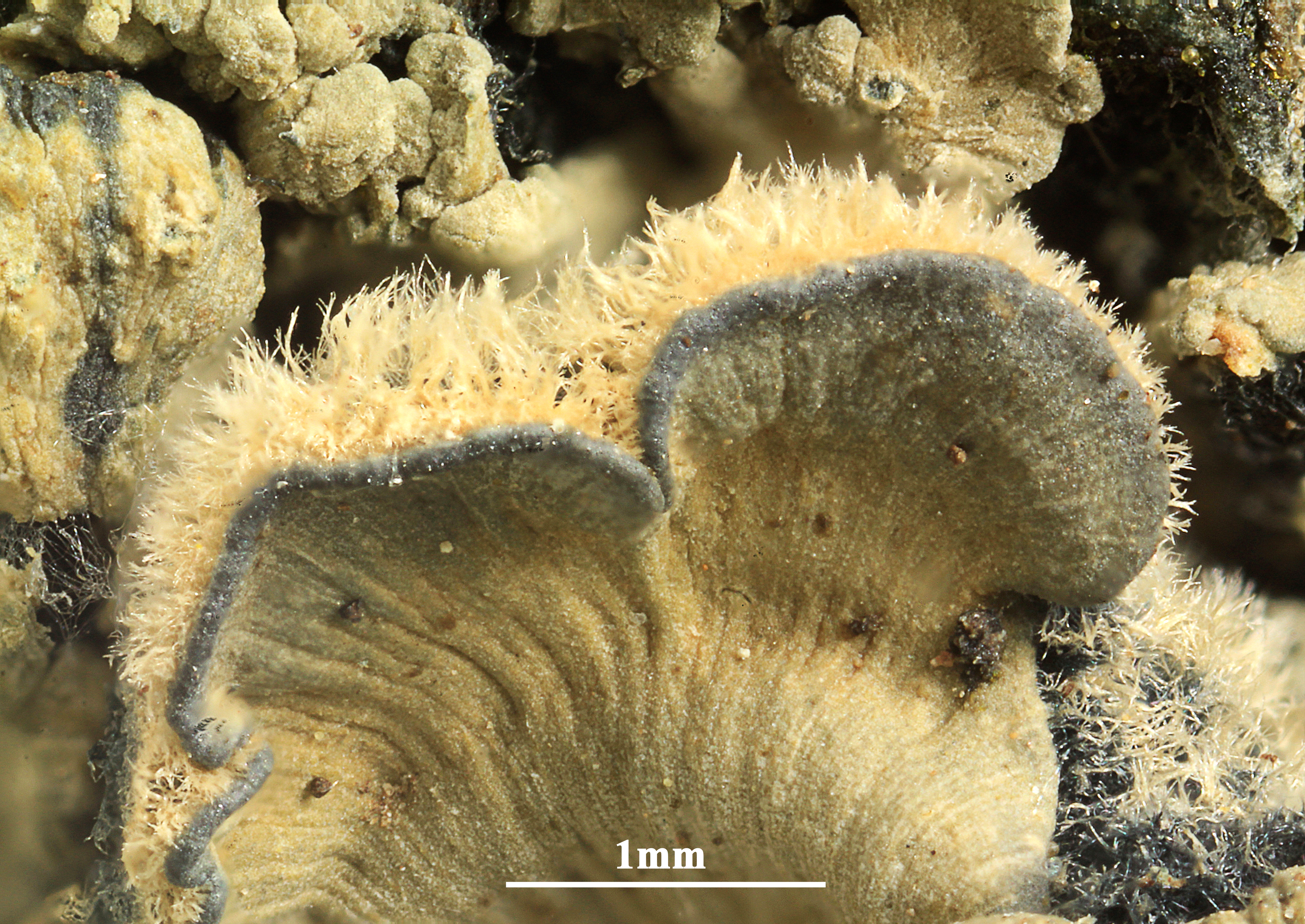
Pectenia atlantica forms a thick, bluish-grey placodioid rosette with grooved lobes.

Pectenia forms bluish-grey, placodioid rosettes—circular patches with a closely attached centre and lobed, slightly uplifted margins—that can reach about 10 cm across. The upper surface is thick and rigid and often shows grooved, scallop-like sculpturing; many thalli also develop prominent longitudinal ridges and are only loosely attached to the substrate.

The thallus has a cellular upper cortex over a layer of the cyanobacterium Nostoc arranged in clusters. Beneath this sits a compact, woven medulla that merges into a thick, felt-like, blue-black hypothallus (a mat of fungal hyphae that can extend beyond the lobes).

Across the complex, the feature that best tracks the genetic lineages is lobe architecture: P. atlantica-type thalli have strongly segmented, trough-shaped lobes ending in a curved transverse ridge, whereas P. plumbea-type thalli lack that segmentation and show a net of fine whitish lines across the surface. Both lineages can bear isidia (and sometimes narrow strap-like outgrowths, "ligulae"), and reproduction mode is not diagnostic.

Fruiting bodies (apothecia) are usually abundant and form on the thallus surface; they have brown discs with a pale, fungus-made rim (biatorine, i.e. lacking a thalline margin). The hymenium (the spore-producing layer) stains persistently blue in iodine (an amyloid reaction) and the asci show a dark, iodine-positive cap at the tip; the sterile threads (paraphyses) are unbranched. Ascospores are produced eight per ascus and are colourless, smooth, ellipsoid and single-celled. Black, mostly marginal pycnidia (small asexual fruiting bodies) are infrequent and produce tiny rod-shaped conidia. No lichen secondary metabolites were detected in thin-layer chromatography.

Experimental work on Pectenia (using P. plumbea as a model) shows that re-establishing the symbiosis can be difficult under laboratory conditions: ascospores failed to germinate despite extensive culture trials, and isolated Nostoc photobionts grew slowly and did not produce motile hormogonia. These traits help explain why successful establishment in nature may depend on ready access to compatible cyanobacteria rather than on spore dispersal alone.

== Habitat and distribution ==
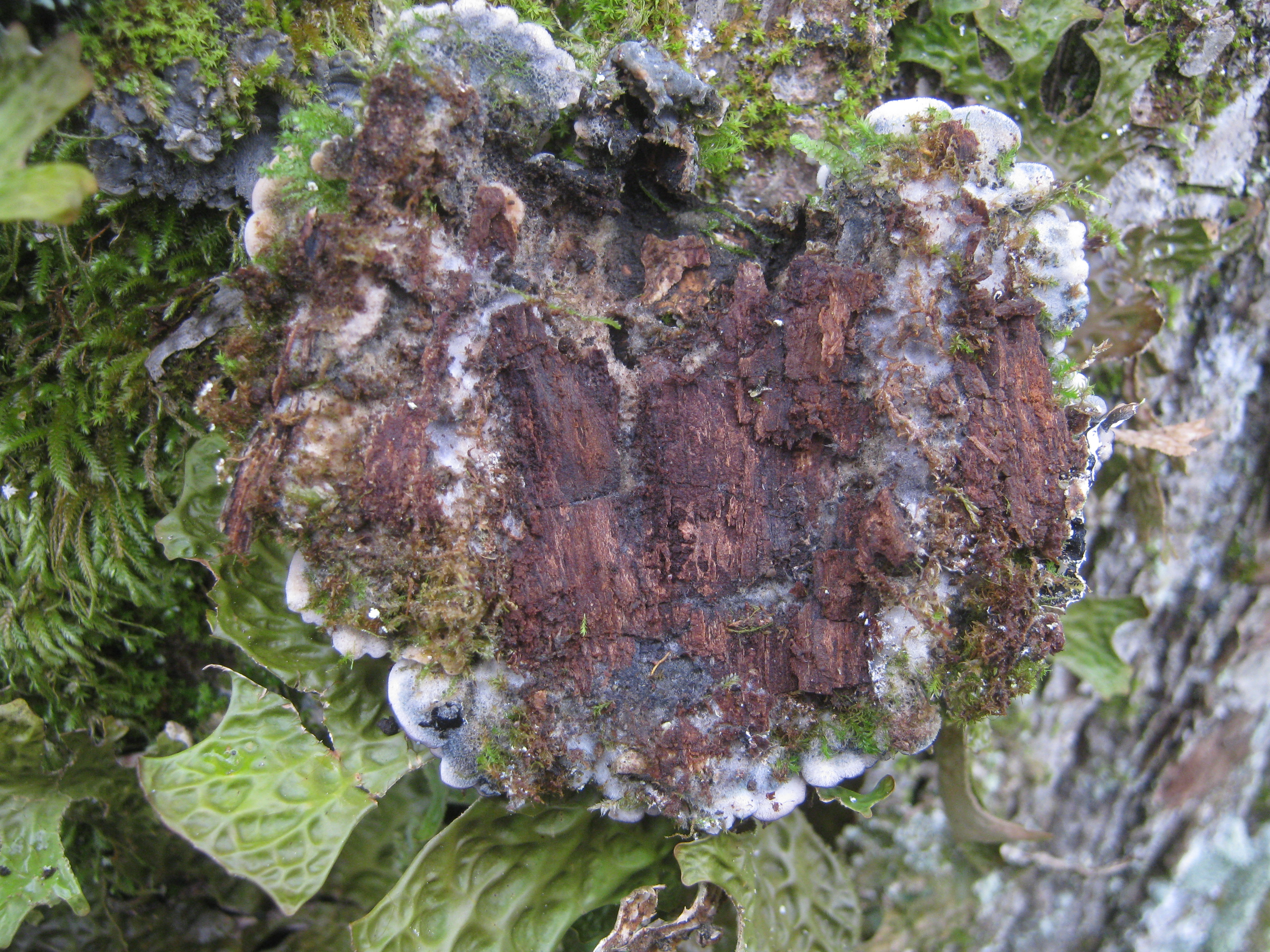
Pectenia cyanoloma

Ekman and colleagues place Pectenia mainly in Atlantic-influenced parts of Europe and neighbouring North Africa, with records concentrated along the Atlantic coast; they also note that P. plumbea occurs in a restricted area of north-eastern North America. The family-level overview likewise treats Pectenia as one of the few pannariaceous genera confined to the Northern Hemisphere, centred in the Atlantic–Mediterranean region of Europe. The protologue offers little in the way of a single, general habitat statement, but the species notes indicate a range of substrates and settings: for example, P. ligulata was typed from the Azores "on mossy earth bank" (i.e. on soil with bryophytes), and P. cyanoloma's lectotype comes from a forest site in Normandy ("in sylva Briquebec").

Complementing that picture, a multilocus study inferred contrasting origins for the main lineages—a Mediterranean ancestral area for the plumbea lineage and a probable Macaronesian origin for the atlantica lineage—and documented a north–south, parapatric split within atlantica (a northern clade in Norway, the British Isles and Azores/Madeira; a southern clade in Madeira, the Canary Islands and Portugal). Regional reports note that populations can be small and scattered and that declines have occurred in some Atlantic areas, a pattern consistent with establishment limits tied to photobiont availability.

== Ecology ==
Within Atlantic-influenced forests, Pectenia is part of a community of lichens that share cyanobacterial partners: the compatible strains of Nostoc rarely live freely on bark and are instead provided mainly by other cyanobacteria-containing lichens in the area that reproduce asexually and spread their photobiont partners. In Iberian study plots, the cyanomorph of Lobaria amplissima (historically called Dendriscocaulon umhausense) functioned as a key local source of compatible Nostoc, effectively facilitating the establishment of sexual species such as Pectenia. This guild structure offers a mechanistic explanation for patchy occurrences and sensitivity to habitat fragmentation. While Cardós and colleagues interpret Pectenia as relying mainly on Nostoc supplied by co-occurring cyanolichens, a contemporaneous commentary cautions that this rests on limited sampling and does not exclude a wider pool of free-living cyanobionts; the same cyanobacterial genotypes can live aposymbiotically and were detected in nature. The commentary also suggests that, given experimental difficulties in obtaining mycelium from spores, the fungal partner may at times be the limiting step rather than photobiont availability alone.

== Species ==
As of October 2025, Species Fungorum (in the Catalogue of Life) accepts four species of Pectenia:

- Pectenia atlantica (Degel.) P.M.Jørg., L.Lindblom, Wedin & S.Ekman (2014)
- Pectenia cyanoloma (Schaer.) P.M.Jørg., L.Lindblom, Wedin & S.Ekman (2014)
- Pectenia ligulata (P.M.Jørg. & P.James) P.M.Jørg., L.Lindblom, Wedin & S.Ekman (2014)
- Pectenia plumbea (Lightf.) P.M.Jørg., L.Lindblom, Wedin & S.Ekman (2014)
