= S. crocea =

S. crocea may refer to:

- Scorzoneroides crocea, a flowering plant
- Seila crocea, a sea snail
- Sobralia crocea, a flowering plant
- Solorina crocea, a lichenized fungus
- Stenaroa crocea, an owlet moth
- Sychnovalva crocea, a tortrix moth
