= Degelia neozelandica =

Scientific classification
- Kingdom: Fungi
- Division: Ascomycota
- Class: Lecanoromycetes
- Order: Peltigerales
- Family: Pannariaceae
- Genus: Degelia
- Species: D. neozelandica

Binomial name
- Degelia neozelandica (C. W. Dodge) P.M.Jørg. & D.J.Galloway

Synonyms
- Steinera neozelandica Parmeliella neozelandica

Species of lichen

Degelia neozelandica is a species of foliose lichen in the genus Degelia.

The species was initially described under Steinera, but was removed in 1982 when the genus was revised by Aino Henssen and Peter Wilfred James. It was then placed into Parmeliella, and later into Degelia.

== Distribution and habitat ==
Degelia neozelandica is most widely found in New Zealand, on both Macquarie and South Islands, but has also been found in a single alpine locality in Tasmania, Australia.

It grows on fine sandy soil in subalpine and alpine grasslands in altitudes of between 900 and 1,800 metres (2,950 and 5,910 feet).

=== Associated species ===
Degelia neozelandica has several associated species with which it is often found. These include Parmeliella crassa, Pannaria hookeri, Solorina spongiosa, Collema coccophorum, Lecanora atra, Pertusaria dactylina, Psoroma buchanani, and Psoroma fruticulosum.
