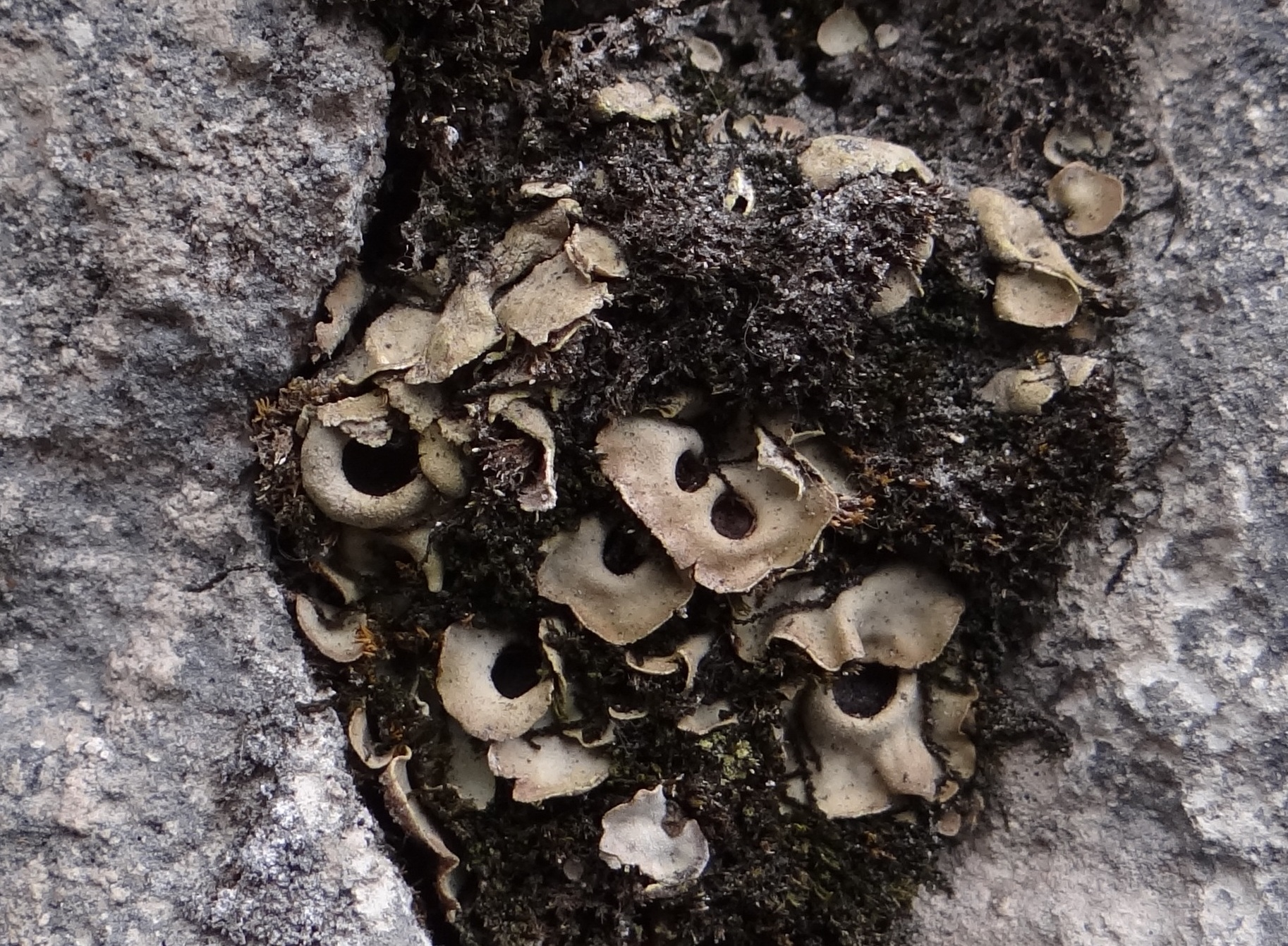
- Growing in a rock crevice, western Tatra Mountains, Poland

Conservation status
- Secure (NatureServe)

Scientific classification
- Kingdom: Fungi
- Division: Ascomycota
- Class: Lecanoromycetes
- Order: Peltigerales
- Family: Peltigeraceae
- Genus: Solorina
- Species: S. bispora

Binomial name
- Solorina bispora Nyl. (1860)

Synonyms
- List: Solorina saccata var. bispora (Nyl.) Arnold (1871); Solorina macrospora Harm. (1910); Solorina bispora var. macrospora (Harm.) H.Olivier (1921); Solorina bispora subsp. macrospora (Harm.) Burgaz & I.Martínez (1998); Solorina monospora Gyeln. (1930); Solorina bispora var. monospora (Gyeln.) Frey (1952)

= Solorina bispora =

Species of lichen-forming fungus

Solorina bispora is a species of foliose lichen in the family Peltigeraceae. It has a circumpolar distribution, occurring in arctic and alpine environments where it grows on humus-rich soils and in rock crevices.

== Taxonomy ==
Solorina bispora was first described by the Finnish lichenologist William Nylander in 1860. His original description emphasised the species' similarity to S. saccata while noting the key differences in thallus characteristics and spore number that justified its recognition as a distinct species. He said it was found in alpine areas at Barèges in the Pyrenees and in Savoy. The species belongs to the genus Solorina, which is characterised by a foliose thallus with apothecia (fruit bodies) impressed in the upper surface.

Historically, there has been debate about infraspecific classification within S. bispora. A 1998 study by Martínez and Burgaz proposed recognising two subspecies based on statistical analyses of spore characteristics: S. bispora subsp. bispora with spores less than 90 μm long, and S. bispora subsp. macrospora with spores greater than 100 μm long. The same study also supported elevating the former variety monospora to species status as S. monospora, based on its distinctive single-spored asci and larger spore size. However, current taxonomic treatments do not recognise these infraspecific taxa as distinct.

The species is distinguished from other members of the genus by having two spores per ascus (spore sac), with each spore having a single septum. The spore wall shows a characteristic deep continuous reticulum pattern when viewed under scanning electron microscopy.

== Description ==
Solorina bispora is a small foliose (leaf-like) lichen that forms patches 5–10 mm (1/4–3/8 in) wide. The thallus (main body) consists of rounded or irregular small lobes surrounded by darker granular tissue. The upper surface appears pale greyish-green, sometimes with brownish tints, and often has a whitish, powdery coating (pruina). When wet, the surface becomes bright green. The lower surface is white with indistinct veining and scattered pale root-like structures called rhizines.

The species produces abundant reproductive structures (apothecia), which are brown to blackish disc-shaped organs partially embedded in the thallus. These measure 2–5 mm (1/8–1/4 in) across and lack a rim of tissue (thalline margin) around their edge. Inside the apothecia, each spore sac (ascus) contains two dark brown spores. The spores are divided into two cells by a central wall (septum) and measure 60–105 by 25–60 micrometres, with a distinctive net-like (reticulation) pattern on their surface.

Like other lichens, S. lbispora is a symbiotic organism containing photosynthetic partners: its primary photobiont is a green alga (Coccomyxa), while it also contains colonies of cyanobacteria (Nostoc) in specialised structures called cephalodia. These cephalodia are usually internal and visible as dark spots on the lower surface, though they occasionally develop externally. The species does not produce any unique lichen products and shows no colour changes when tested with common chemical spot tests used in lichen identification.

== Habitat and distribution ==
Solorina bispora grows predominantly in calcareous environments, particularly in rock crevices and on humus-rich soils. The species has been documented across several European countries, including France, Iceland, Norway, Spain, Sweden, Austria, and Switzerland. It occurs across a wide elevational range, typically from 750 to 2,700 metres above sea level. In North America, S. bispora has been recorded from Alaska, the Arctic, the Pacific Northwest, and the Rocky Mountains. It is uncommon in Ontario. Its circumpolar distribution includes South Greenland and Svalbard.

The lichen can be found in various montane and subalpine habitats. In Spain, it has been recorded growing in rock crevices within Pinus nigra and Fagus sylvatica forests. In Sweden, it has been documented in mountain meadows and rock crevices. Specimens have also been collected from calcareous grasslands and on soil among mosses. In Nepal, Solorina bispora has been reported from 3,600 to 4,200 m elevation in a compilation of published records.

At lower elevations, it tends to occur in sheltered, north-facing rock crevices within forested areas, while at higher elevations it can be found in more exposed alpine environments.
