= Silene longicilia =

Conservation status
- Least Concern (IUCN 3.1)

Scientific classification
- Kingdom: Plantae
- Clade: Tracheophytes
- Clade: Angiosperms
- Clade: Eudicots
- Order: Caryophyllales
- Family: Caryophyllaceae
- Genus: Silene
- Species: S. longicilia

Binomial name
- Silene longicilia (Brot.) Otth

Synonyms
- Cucubalus longicilius Brot.; Silene cintrana Rothm.; Silene patuala Desf.; Silene longicilia subsp. longicilia (Brot.) Otth; Silene longicilia subsp. cintrana ((Brot.) Otth) Jeanmonod

Species of flowering plant

Silene longicilia is a species of flowering plant of the family Caryophyllaceae. It is endemic to Portugal.

== Distribution and habitat ==
The species is endemic to west central Portugal and it ranges from Figueira da Foz and Coimbra in the north, to Sesimbra and a part of Alentejo in the south, and has its greatest extent in limestone soils at Serras de Aire e Candeeiros, Serra de Montejunto, Serra De Sintra and an isolated population in Serra da Arrábida. It is commonly found in rock crevices from sea-level up to 650 metres (2,130 ft) in altitude.
