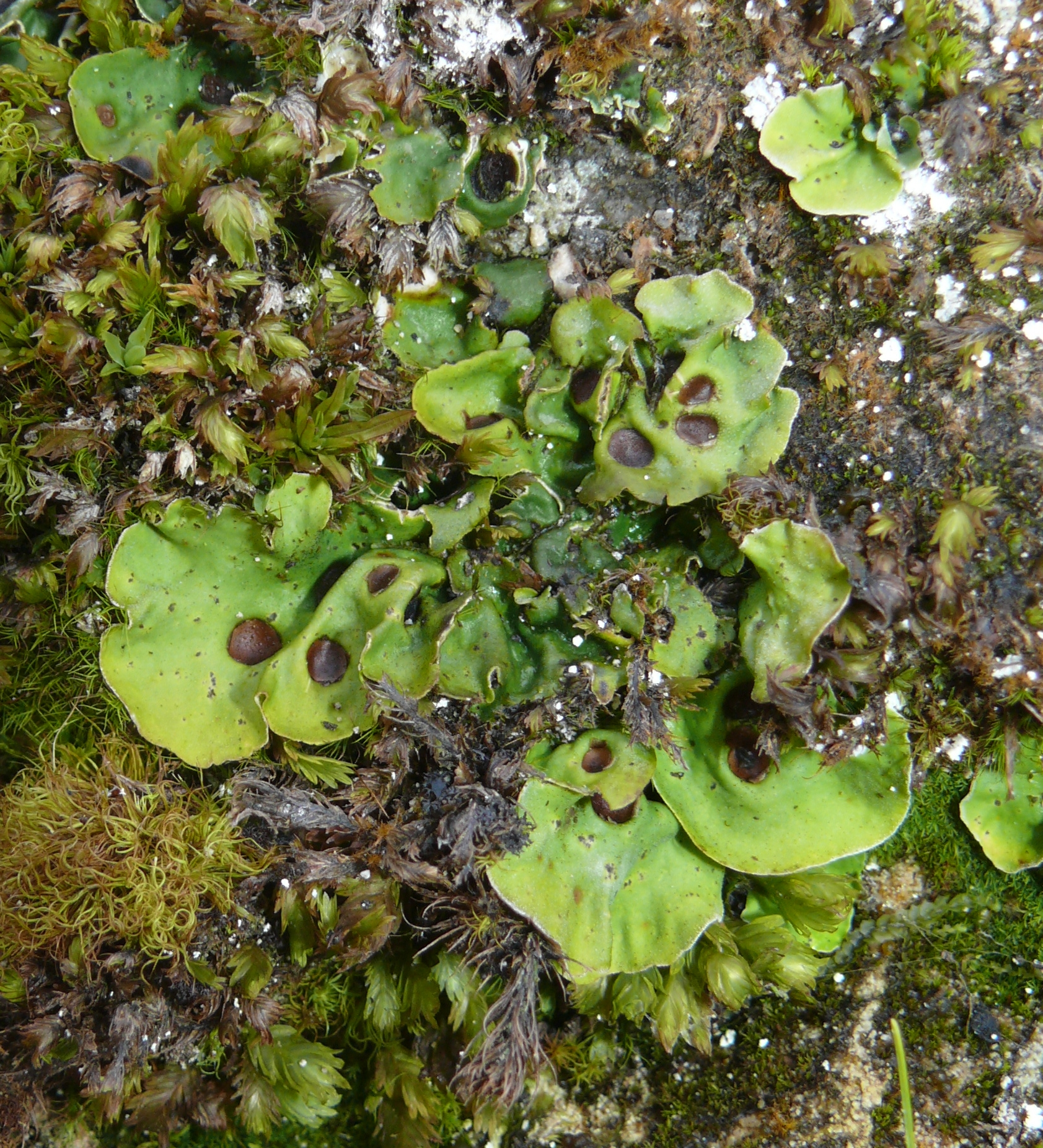
- Solorina saccata

Scientific classification
- Kingdom: Fungi
- Division: Ascomycota
- Class: Lecanoromycetes
- Order: Peltigerales
- Family: Peltigeraceae
- Genus: Solorina; Ach. (1808)

Type species
- Solorina crocea (L.) Ach. (1808)

Synonyms
- Sommerfeltia Flörke ex Sommerf.(1827); Solorinina Nyl. (1884); Solorina sect. Neosolorina Gyeln. (1930); Ruspoliella Sambo (1937); Neosolorina (Gyeln.) Räsänen (1943); Solorinomyces E.A.Thomas ex Cif. & Tomas. (1953)

= Solorina =

Genus of lichens

Solorina is a genus of 10 species of lichenized fungi in the family Peltigeraceae. The genus was first described by the Swedish botanist Erik Acharius in 1808. Members of the genus are commonly called socket lichens.

== Species ==
- Solorina bispora Nyl. (1860)
- Solorina crocea (L.) Ach. (1808)
- Solorina crocoides Gyeln. (1930)
- Solorina embolina Nyl. (1884)
- Solorina fuegiensis C.W.Dodge (1971)
- Solorina octospora Arnold (1876)
- Solorina platycarpa Hue (1907)
- Solorina saccata (L.) Ach. (1808)
- Solorina simensis Hochst. ex Flot. (1843)
- Solorina spongiosa (Ach.) Anzi (1862)
