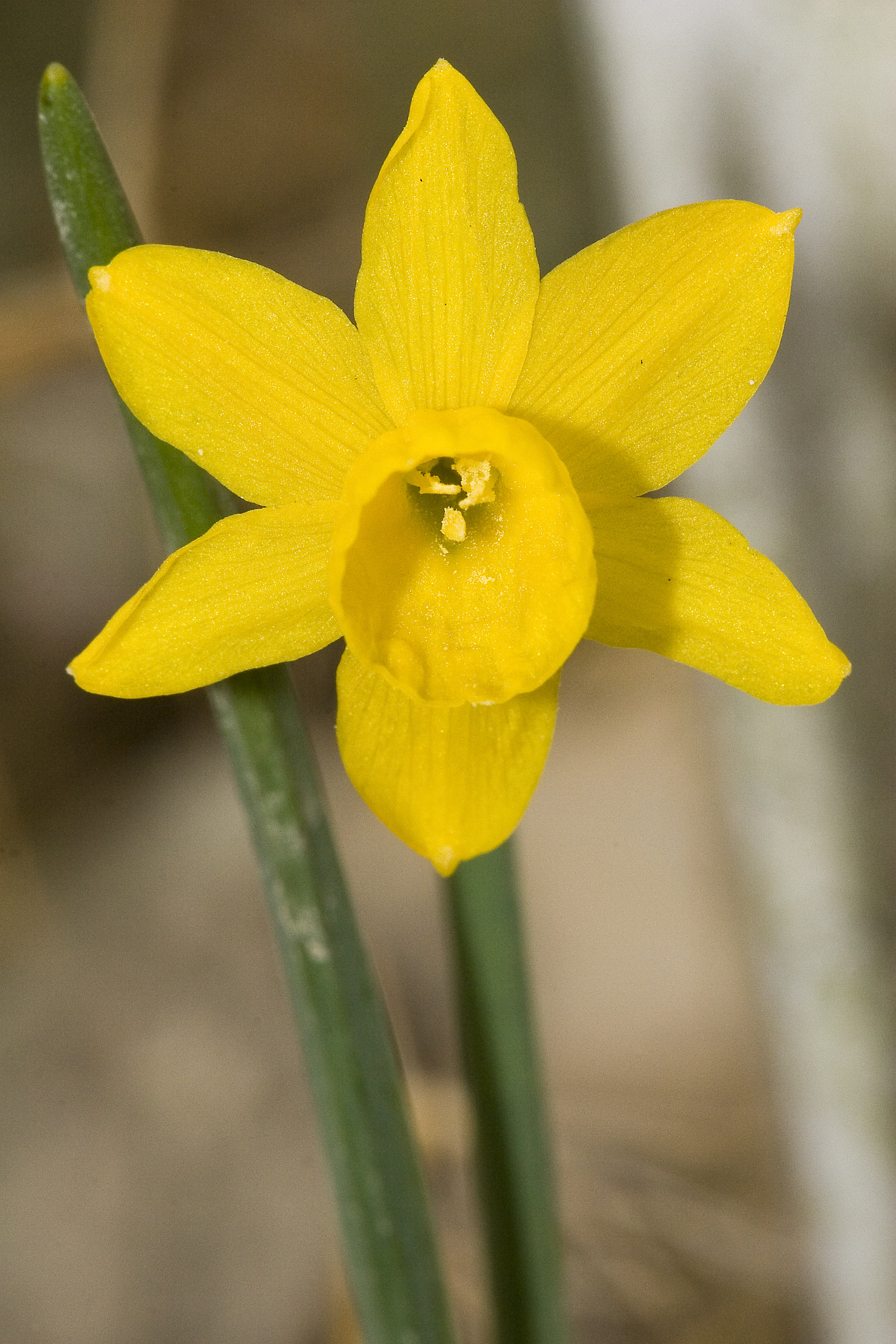

Conservation status
- Least Concern (IUCN 3.1)

Scientific classification
- Kingdom: Plantae
- Clade: Embryophytes
- Clade: Tracheophytes
- Clade: Spermatophytes
- Clade: Angiosperms
- Clade: Monocots
- Order: Asparagales
- Family: Amaryllidaceae
- Subfamily: Amaryllidoideae
- Genus: Narcissus
- Species: N. calcicola

Binomial name
- Narcissus calcicola Mendonça
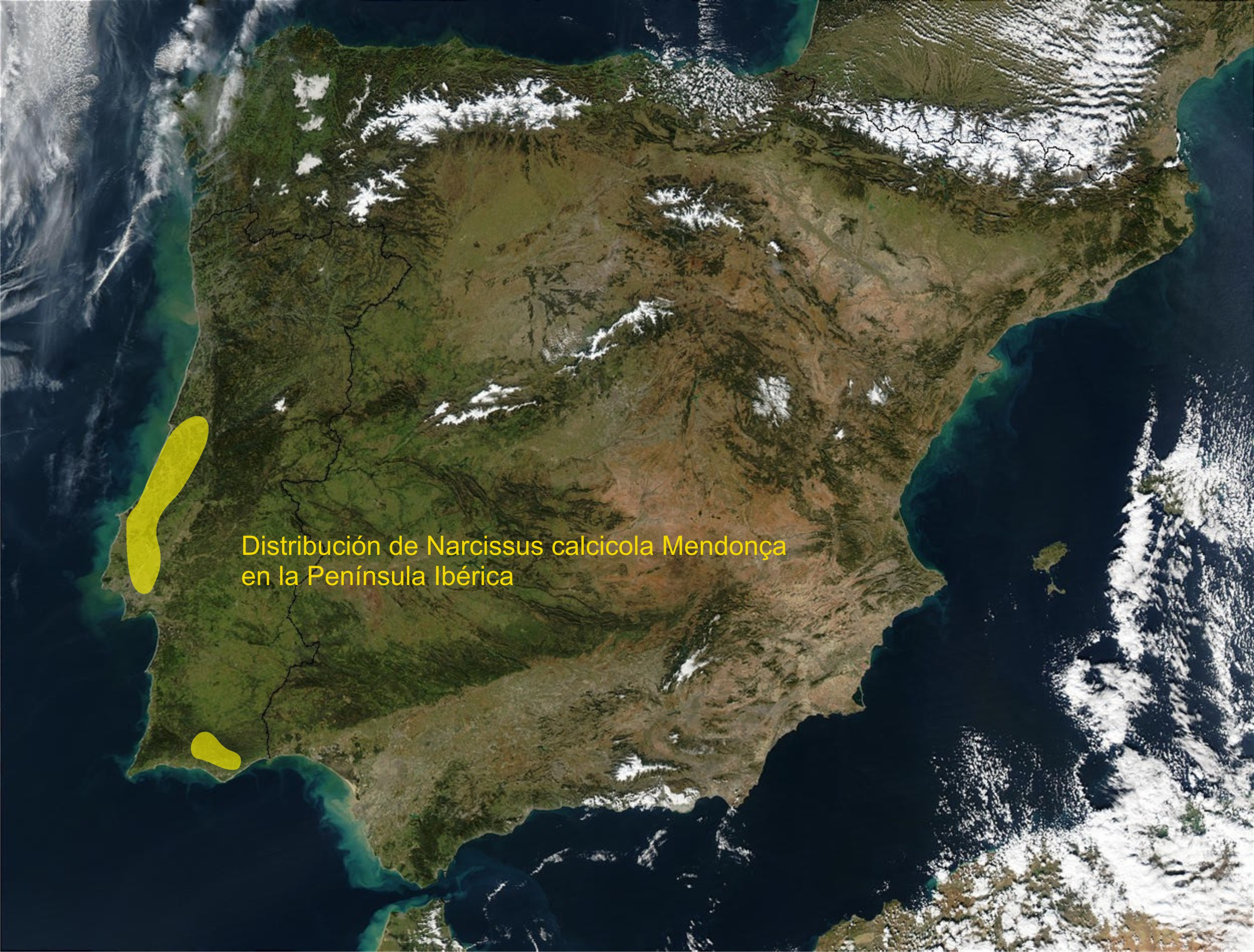
- Distribution range in the Iberian Peninsula

Synonyms
- Narcissus scaberulus subsp. calcicola (Mendonça) Aedo

= Narcissus calcicola =

Species of daffodil

Narcissus calcicola is a species of narcissus (daffodils) in the family Amaryllidaceae. It is classified in Section Apodanthi. It is endemic to Portugal.

== Description ==
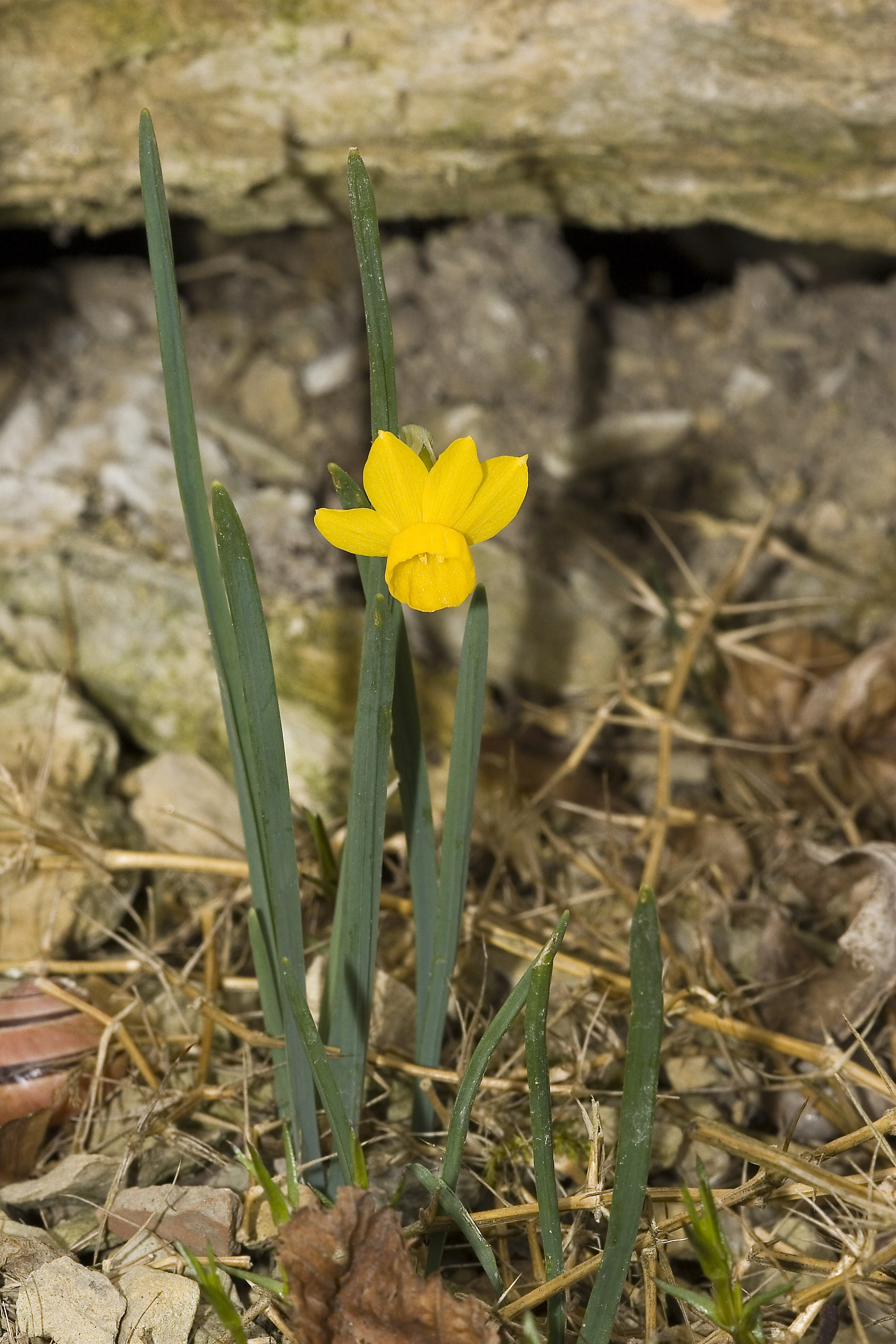

Narcissus calcicola is a bulbous plant.

== Distribution and habitat ==
Narcissus calcicola is endemic to Portugal and is found primarily in crevices of limestone outcrops and less frequently in rocky clearings, on the edge of holm oak groves or even under forest cover. Its range includes Serra de Sicó, Serras de Aire e Candeeiros, Serra de Montejunto, Serra da Arrábida and the Algarvian Barrocal.
