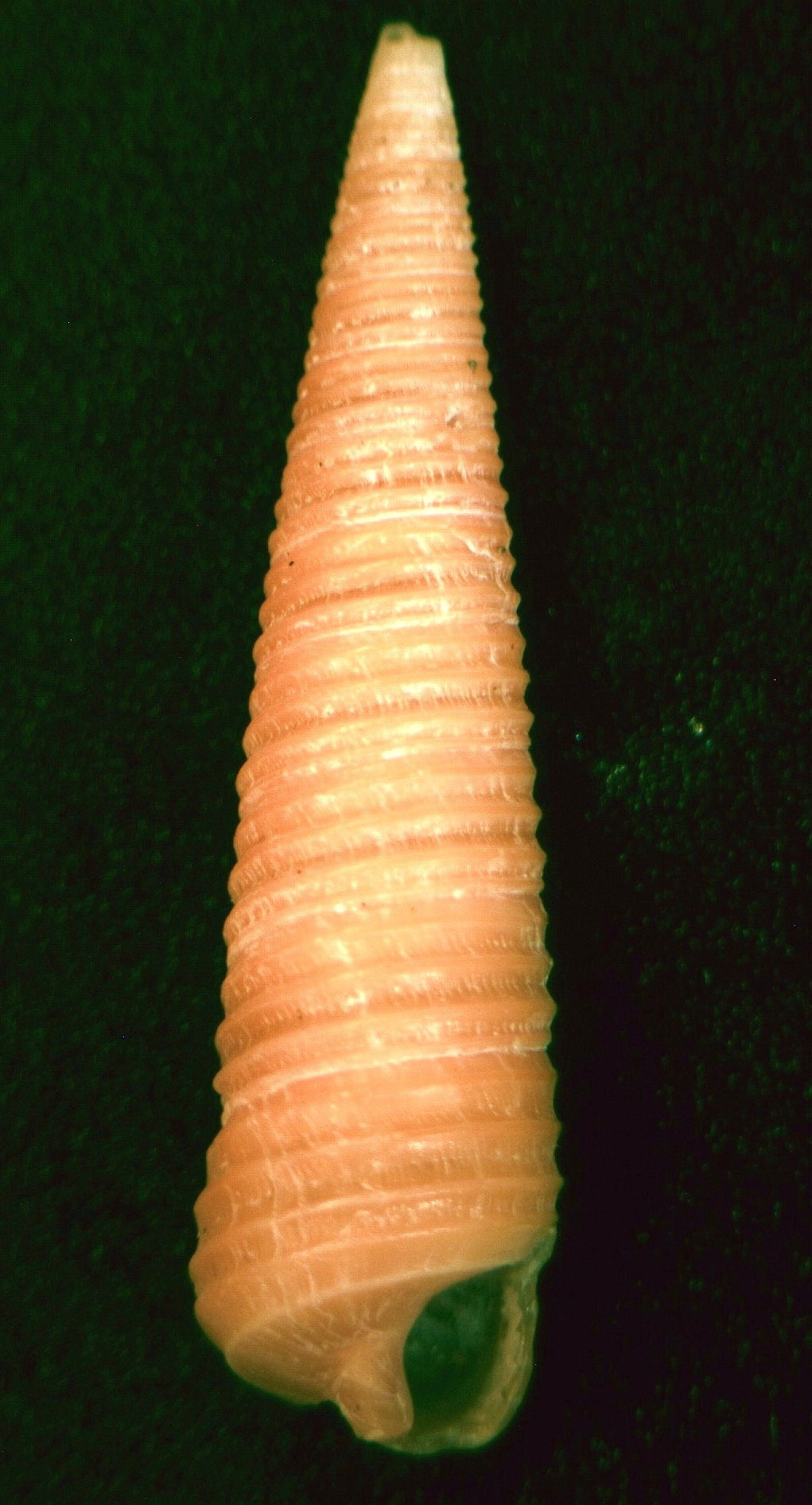
- A shell of Seila crocea

Scientific classification
- Kingdom: Animalia
- Phylum: Mollusca
- Class: Gastropoda
- Subclass: Caenogastropoda
- Order: incertae sedis
- Family: Cerithiopsidae
- Genus: Seila; A. Adams, 1861

Type species
- Triphoris dextroversus A. Adams & Reeve, 1850

Synonyms
- Cerithiella (Seila) ·; Cerithiopsis (Seila) A. Adams, 1861; Cinctella Monterosato, 1884; Hebeseila Finlay, 1926; Lyroseila Finlay, 1928; Notoseila Finlay, 1926; Seila (Hebeseila) Finlay, 1926; Seila (Lyroseila) Finlay, 1928; Seila (Notoseila) Finlay, 1926

= Seila =

Genus of molluscs

Seila is a genus of minute sea snails, marine gastropod molluscs or micromolluscs in the family Cerithiopsidae.

== General characteristics ==
(Original description in Latin) The shell is subulate and slender. Its whorls are spirally lirate, and the interspaces are sculptured. The aperture is provided with a short siphonal canal

This section Cerithiopsis (Seila) is based on Triphoris dextroversus Adams & Reeve (synonym of Seila dextroversa (A. Adams & Reeve, 1850)) and on an allied new species. In form and general appearance, they certainly resemble some species of Triphoris (synonym of Triphora Blainville, 1828); however, both are dextral, and neither has the closed canal characteristic of that genus. They also differ from the other species of Cerithiopsis in being transversely lirate rather than ribbed or cancellate.

== Species ==
According to the World Register of Marine Species (WoRMS), the following species with valid names are included within the genus Seila:

- Seila adamsii (H.C. Lea, 1845)
- Seila alexanderensis Cecalupo & Perugia, 2018
- Seila alfredensis Bartsch, 1915
- Seila altissima (Golikov & Gulbin, 1978)
- † Seila anderseni Schnetler, 2001
- Seila angolensis Rolán & Fernandes, 1990
- † Seila archimedis (Deshayes, 1864)
- Seila assimilata (C.B. Adams, 1852)
- Seila atkinsoni (Tenison Woods, 1876)
- † Seila attenuissima P. Marshall & R. Murdoch, 1920
- Seila bandorensis (Melvill, 1893)
- Seila baudisonensis Cecalupo & Perugia, 2018
- Seila bulbosa Suter, 1908
- † Seila cantaurana Landau, C. M. Silva & Heitz, 2016
- Seila capricornia (Laseron, 1956)
- Seila carinata (E.A. Smith, 1871) (accepted > unreplaced junior homonym)
- Seila carquejai Rolán & Fernandes, 1990
- Seila cincta (Hutton, 1886)
- Seila cingulata (A. Adams, 1861)
- Seila cingulifera (Thiele, 1930)
- † Seila clifdenensis (Laws, 1941)
- Seila conica Cecalupo & Perugia, 2012
- † Seila crassicincta (Sacco, 1895)
- Seila crocea (Angas, 1871)
- Seila crovatoi Cecalupo & Perugia, 2014
- Seila deaurata Rolán & Fernandes, 1990
- Seila decorata Cecalupo & Perugia, 2012
- Seila dextroversa (Adams & Reeve, 1850 in 1848-50)
- Seila dilecta Marshall, 1978
- Seila elegantissima Marshall, 1978
- Seila exquisita Cecalupo & Perugia, 2012
- Seila felicis Cecalupo & Perugia, 2023
- † Seila gagei Maxwell, 1992
- Seila gloriosa Cecalupo & Perugia, 2021

- † Seila heilmannclauseni Schnetler, 2001

- Seila hinduorum (Melvill, 1898)
- † Seila inaequilirata (Deshayes, 1864)
- Seila incerta Cecalupo & Perugia, 2013
- Seila inchoata Rolán & Fernandes, 1990
- † Seila infrapercincta (Sacco, 1895)
- Seila insignis (May, 1911)
- Seila iredalei (Laseron, 1956)
- Seila japonica (T. Habe, 1970)
- † Seila kaiparaensis (Laws, 1941)
- Seila kuiperi Rolán & Pelorce, 2006
- Seila laqueata (Gould, 1861)
- Seila lirata G.B. Sowerby III, 1897
- Seila mactanensis Cecalupo & Perugia, 2012
- Seila maculosa Laseron, 1951
- Seila magna Laseron, 1951
- Seila maoria Marshall, 1978
- Seila marmorata (Tate, 1893)
- Seila maxima Cecalupo & Perugia, 2014
- Seila montereyensis Bartsch, 1907
- Seila morishimai (Habe, 1970)
- Seila nigrofusca Laseron, 1951
- † Seila parameces (Cossmann & Pissarro, 1902)
- Seila parilis Rolán & Fernandes, 1990
- † Seila petasa Landau, Ceulemans & Van Dingenen, 2018
- † Seila planilata Nützel, 1998
- † Seila plioiberica Landau, La Perna & Marquet, 2006
- † Seila ponsonbyi W. H. Turton, 1932
- † Seila praelonga (Deshayes, 1864)
- Seila pulmoensis DuShane & Draper, 1975
- † Seila quadricingulata (Deshayes, 1864)
- † Seila quadrifida (Deshayes, 1833)
- † Seila quadristriaris (O. Meyer & Aldrich, 1886)
- † Seila quadrisulcata (Lamarck, 1804)
- † Seila quinquecarinata Bouchard, Wesselingh, Pouwer & Landau, 2025
- † Seila ravni Glibert, 1973
- Seila regia Marshall, 1978
- Seila retusa Cecalupo & Perugia, 2014
- Seila samoaensis Cecalupo & Perugia, 2019
- † Seila sancticlementi Marquet, 2001
- Seila sarinoae Cecalupo & Perugia, 2019
- † Seila selsoifensis Marquet, 2001
- Seila sienii Cecalupo & Perugia, 2017
- Seila silviae Cecalupo & Perugia, 2012
- Seila slacksmithae Cecalupo & Perugia, 2021
- Seila smithi Bartsch, 1915
- † Seila societatis Cecalupo & Perugia, 2014
- Seila stenopyrgisca Darragh, 2017
- Seila subalbida Dall, 1927
- † Seila suttonensis Marquet, 2001
- † Seila tenuifila (Briart & Cornet, 1877)
- Seila tenuis (Laseron, 1951)
- Seila terebelloides (Hutton, 1873)
- Seila tissieri Cecalupo & Perugia, 2020
- † Seila trifaria (Deshayes, 1864)
- Seila trilineata (Philippi, 1836)
- † Seila trilirata (Deshayes, 1864)
- † Seila triplanicincta Ludbrook, 1957
- † Seila turritissima Sacco, 1895
- Seila vanuatuensis Cecalupo & Perugia, 2013
- Seila variabilis Cecalupo & Perugia, 2012
- † Seila variata (Deshayes, 1864)
- Seila versluysi (Schepman, 1909)
- Seila wadeiensis Cecalupo & Perugia, 2018
- † Seila waluensis Ladd, 1972
- Seila wareni Cecalupo & Perugia, 2012

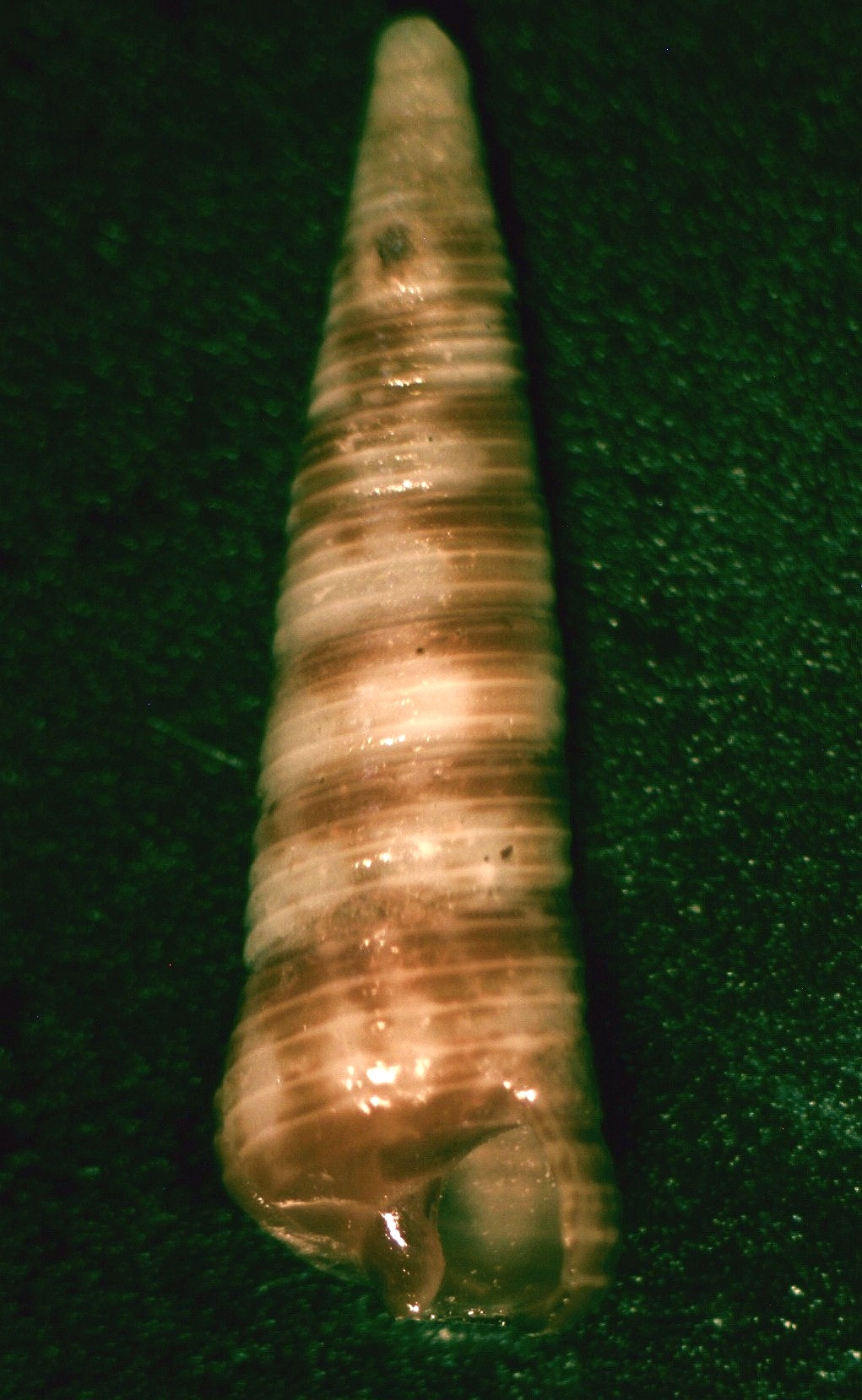
A shell of Seila marmorata

The Indo-Pacific Molluscan database also includes the following species with names in current use:

- Seila catenaria (Melvill & Standen, 1896)
- Seila parva (Angas, 1877)

Species brought into synonymy

- Seila africana Bartsch, 1915: synonym of Seila lirata (G. B. Sowerby III, 1897)
- Seila albosutura (Tenison-Woods, 1876): synonym of Seila atkinsoni (Tenison Woods, 1876)
- Seila attenuata Hedley, 1900: synonym of Seilarex turritelliformis (Angas, 1877)
- Seila bulbosa Suter, 1908: synonym of † Seila (Hebeseila) bulbosa Suter, 1908
- Seila capitata Thiele, 1925: synonym of Proseila capitata (Thiele, 1925)
- Seila chathamensis Suter, 1908: synonym of Seila (Lyroseila) cinctum (Hutton, 1885)
- Seila chenui Jay & Drivas, 2002: synonym of Retilaskeya chenui (M. Jay & Drivas, 2002) (unaccepted > superseded combination)
- Seila cochleata Suter, 1908: synonym of Seila chathamensis Suter, 1908
- Seila dissimilis Suter, 1908: synonym of Specula styliformis (Suter, 1908)
- Seila huttoni Suter, 1915: synonym of Seila chathamensis Suter, 1908
- Seila reunionensis Jay & Drivas, 2002: synonym of Cerithiella reunionensis (Jay & Drivas, 2002)
- Seila terebralis (C. B. Adams, 1840): synonym of Seila adamsii (H.C. Lea, 1845)
