= Solorinic acid =

Chemical compound found in some lichens

Names
- IUPAC name 2-hexanoyl-1,3,8-trihydroxy-6-methoxyanthracene-9,10-dione
- Other names 2-n-hexanoyl-1,3,8-trihydroxy-6-methoxy-anthraquinone

Identifiers
CAS Number	10210-21-6
3D model (JSmol)	Interactive image
ChEBI	CHEBI:144072
ChemSpider	90031
PubChem CID	99653
UNII	GFT6JJ47QX
CompTox Dashboard (EPA)	DTXSID40144639
- InChI: InChI=1S/C21H20O7/c1-3-4-5-6-13(22)18-15(24)9-12-17(21(18)27)20(26)16-11(19(12)25)7-10(28-2)8-14(16)23/h7-9,23-24,27H,3-6H2,1-2H3 Key: MLTVHORGISIISB-UHFFFAOYSA-N
- SMILES: CCCCCC(=O)C1=C(C=C2C(=C1O)C(=O)C3=C(C2=O)C=C(C=C3O)OC)O

Properties
Chemical formula	C_{21}H_{20}O_{7}
Molar mass	384.384 g·mol^{−1}
Appearance	orange-red crystals
Density	1.4±0.1 g/cm3
Melting point	201 °C (394 °F; 474 K)
Boiling point	613.4±55.0 °C

Hazards
Flash point	217.7±25.0 °C
- Except where otherwise noted, data are given for materials in their standard state (at 25 °C [77 °F], 100 kPa). Infobox references

Solorinic acid is an anthraquinone pigment found in the leafy lichen Solorina crocea. It is responsible for the strong orange colour of the medulla and the underside of the thallus in that species. In its purified crystalline form, it exists as orange-red crystals with a melting point of 201 °C (394 °F).

The structure of solorinic acid, 2-n-hexanoyl-1,3,8-trihydroxy-6-methoxy-anthraquinone, was proposed by Koller and Russ in 1937, and verified by chemical synthesis in 1966.

Norsolorinic acid, (C_{20}H_{18}O_{7}, 2-hexanoyl-1,3,6,8-tetrahydroxyanthraquinone), is a closely related compound also found in Solorina crocea.

Solorinic acid was used as the internal standard in the establishment of a standardized method for the identification of lichen products using high-performance liquid chromatography. This is because it is quite a hydrophobic compound, and consequently will elute more slowly than most lichen products, making possible the identification of lichen extracts containing chlorinated xanthones or long chain depsides.

Although usually associated with Solorina crocea, solorinic acid was reported as a lichen product from the crustose, rock-dwelling lichen Placolecis kunmingensis, described as a species new to science in 2019.
