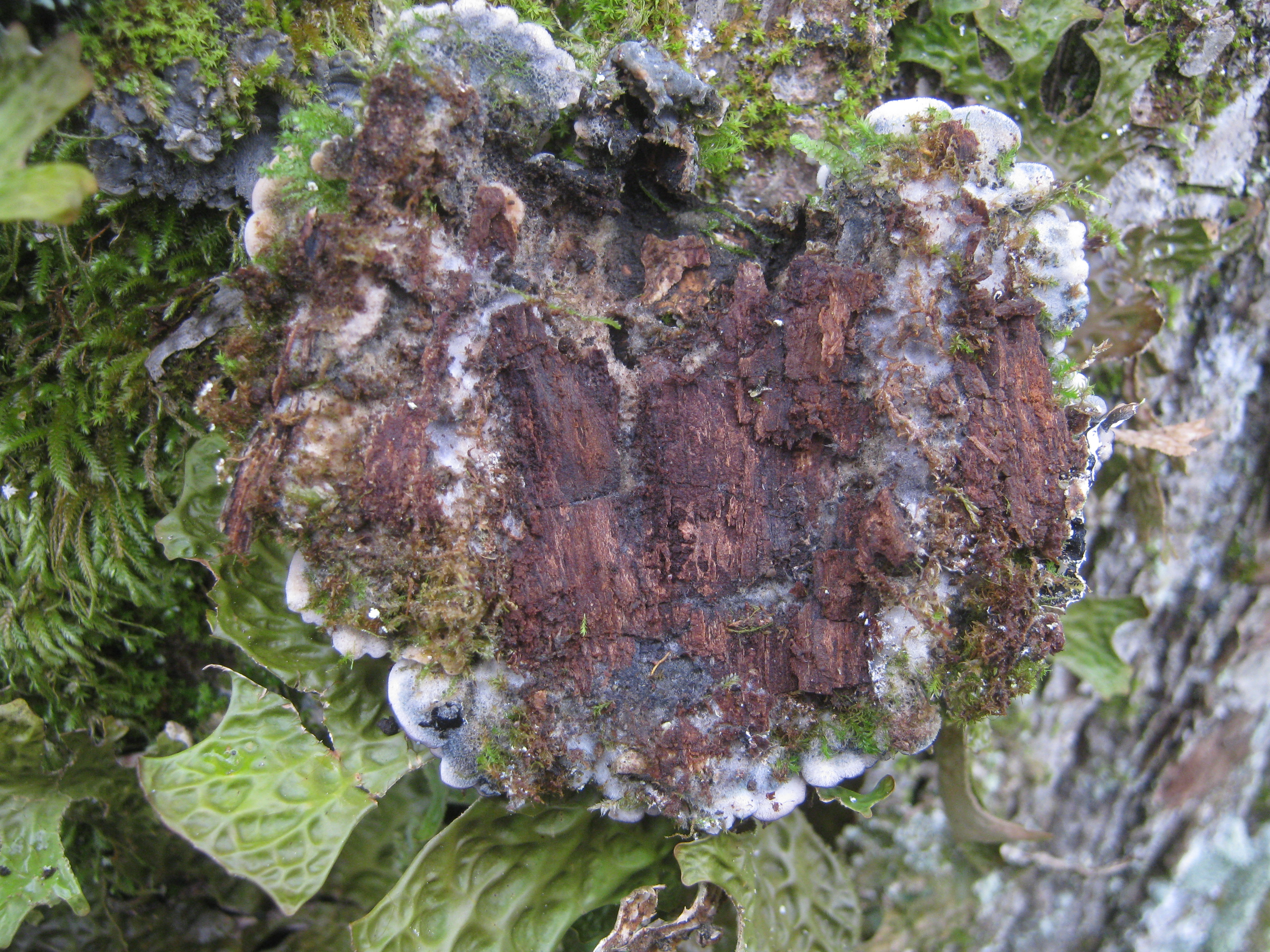
- D. cyanoloma in Serra de Montejunto, Portugal

Scientific classification
- Domain: Eukaryota
- Kingdom: Fungi
- Division: Ascomycota
- Class: Lecanoromycetes
- Order: Peltigerales
- Family: Pannariaceae
- Genus: Degelia
- Species: D. cyanoloma

Binomial name
- Degelia cyanoloma (Schear.) H. H. Blom & L. Lindblom (2010)

Synonyms
- Pectenia cyanoloma Parmelia plumbea var. cyanoloma

= Degelia cyanoloma =

Species of lichen

Degelia cyanoloma is a species of blue-grey to lead-grey foliose lichen in the genus Degelia. It mostly grows on mossy trees in undisturbed woodlands. It is found in the Scottish Highlands, western Ireland and Norway (as well as less prolifically in Spain, France and Portugal), as it grows in maritime Atlantic climates.

Degelia cyanoloma was previously thought to be a variant of Degelia plumbea.
