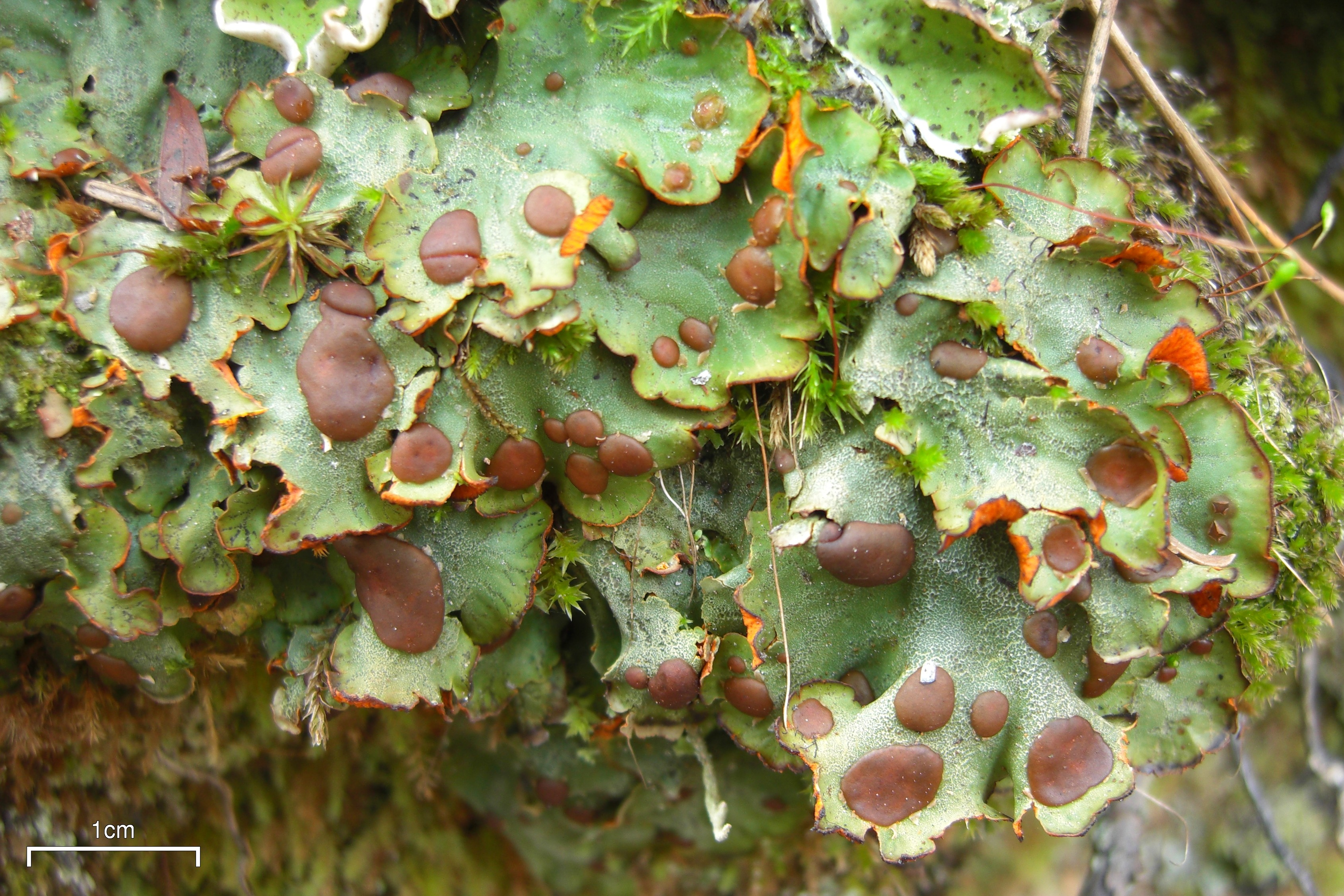
- In Wells Gray Provincial Park, British Columbia; scale bar is 1 cm (3/8 in)

Conservation status
- Secure (NatureServe)

Scientific classification
- Kingdom: Fungi
- Division: Ascomycota
- Class: Lecanoromycetes
- Order: Peltigerales
- Family: Peltigeraceae
- Genus: Solorina
- Species: S. crocea

Binomial name
- Solorina crocea (L.) Ach. (1808)

Synonyms
- Lichen croceus L. (1753); Peltigera crocea (L.) Hoffm. (1794); Peltidea crocea (L.) Ach. (1803); Arthonia crocea (L.) Ach. (1806); Parmelia crocea (L.) Spreng. (1827)

= Solorina crocea =

Species of lichen

Solorina crocea, commonly known as the orange chocolate chip lichen, is a species of terricolous (ground-dwelling) and foliose (leafy) lichen in the family Peltigeraceae. The lichen, which was first formally described by Carl Linnaeus in 1753, has an arctic–alpine and circumpolar distribution and occurs in Asia, Europe, North America, and New Zealand. It generally grows on the bare ground in sandy soils, often in moist soil near snow patches or seepage areas. Although several forms and varieties of the lichen have been proposed in its history, these are not considered to have any independent taxonomic significance.

The colouration of Solorina crocea is quite distinct, making it readily identifiable: its upper thallus surface is green, while both the undersurface and its internal medulla are bright orange. The orange colour results from a pigment called solorinic acid, one of several secondary compounds that occur in the lichen. The thallus features dark brown discs, usually sunken into the surface, which are apothecia–where spores are produced. The lichen has both blue-green algae and green algae as symbiotic partners (photobionts); they are organized into separate layers in the lichen thallus.

== Taxonomy ==
The species was one of the first lichen species formally described to science by Carl Linnaeus in his influential 1753 work Species Plantarum. He named it Lichen crocea, as it was his convention to classify all lichens in the eponymously named genus Lichen. His diagnosis made reference to the foliose thallus, the yellow underside (croceum is Latin for "saffron-coloured" or "yellow") and yellow veins on the upper side. To his understanding, the lichen occurred in Lapland, Switzerland, and Greenland. Although his 1753 work was the first official taxonomic description of the species, he had previously mentioned it in his works Flora Svecica (1745), and Flora Lapponica (1737).

Later authors thought that the species was more appropriately classified in other genera, so in its taxonomic history, the taxon has been transferred to Peltigera (Georg Franz Hoffmann, 1794), Peltidea (Erik Acharius, 1803), Arthonia (Acharius, 1806), and Parmelia (Kurt Sprengel, 1827). The taxon is now known as the type species of Solorina, a genus circumscribed by Acharius in 1808.

Some forms and varieties of Solorina crocea have been described, but these do not have independent taxonomic significance, and are assessed by Index Fungorum to be synonymous with the nominate taxon. These historical subtaxa include:

- Solorina crocea f. complicata (Anzi) Bagl. & Car. (1865)
- Solorina crocea f. dubia Gyeln. (1930)
- Solorina crocea f. irregularis Gyeln. (1930)
- Solorina crocea var. complicata Anzi (1860)
- Solorina crocea var. eutipa Gyeln. 1930

Vernacular names the species has acquired in North America include the "saffron-yellow solorina", and the "orange chocolate chip lichen"; the name refers to the large brownish fruitbodies (ascomata), which have an appearance resembling chocolate chips. In the United Kingdom and Ireland, members of the genus are commonly known as "socket lichens", and the species is sometimes called "mountain saffron".

== Description ==
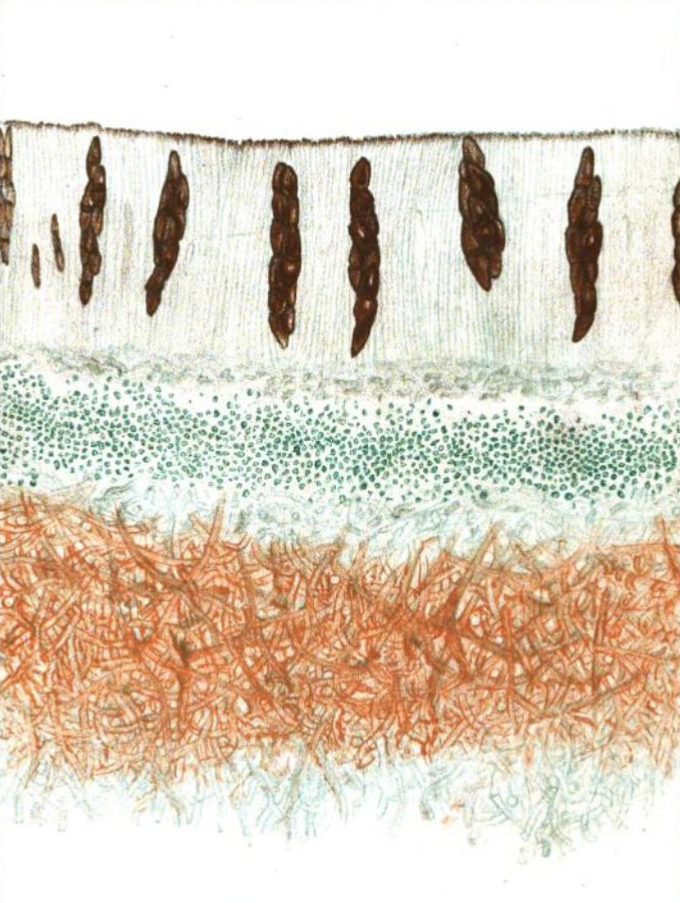
Illustration of a vertical section of thallus and apothecium. The hymenium is the upper layer of erect filaments (paraphyses) with brownish tips, and contains asci with brownish ascospores; the paraphyses originate from a layer called the hypothecium. Under this is a layer of green algal cells. The lowest layer of orange-tinted hyphae is the medulla.

The foliose thallus of Solorina crocea forms large rosettes comprising thick, rounded lobes; it typically measures up to 6 cm (2 3/8 in) broad, although measurements up to 10 cm (4 in) have been recorded. It is usually tightly pressed to its growing surface. The lobes comprising the thallus are 5–15 mm (3/16–9/16 in) wide with slightly upturned edges; their outline varies from irregular to rounded. The upper thallus surface, when moist, is olive green; in less hydrated conditions it becomes reddish brown. The lower thallus surface is bright orange with a tomentose texture and a somewhat reticulate pattern of brownish veins. Lacking a cortex (an outer layer of compacted hyphae), it resembles a mat of orange-coloured, entangled threads. The medulla is orange. Isidia and soredia are absent. The distinctive colouration of the upper and lower surface make this lichen readily identifiable, although in the field the colour difference may not be easy to discern if the lichen is tightly attached to its substrate.

The brown to reddish-brown apothecia measure 2–10 mm (1/16–3/8 in) in diameter. They are either more or less level with the cortex or somewhat convex, rather than in concave depressions, as is the case with some other Solorina species. The photobiont partners of Solorina crocea are arranged in two distinct layers in the thallus. A more or less continuous layer with green algae lies above a patchy cyanobacterial layer.

There are six to eight ascospores in each ascus of Solorina crocea. They are brown with an ellipsoid shape, and contain a single transverse septum that divides the spore into two compartments. Based on a sampling of European specimens, the ascospores were measured to be an average of 11.0 μm wide (ranging from 8.4 to 21.2 μm) by 39.0 μm long (ranging from 26.6 to 51.1 μm). The fine details of ascospore structure have been studied using scanning electron microscopy, revealing that there is a consistent, distinctive ornamentation in the spores of each of the most common arctic-alpine Solorina species. In S. crocea, the spores are covered with irregularly shaped papillae (small pimple-like structures), but do not form ridges or reticulations. The tips of the spores are rounded, and there is a slight constriction between the two cells. Solorina octospora has similar spore size and ornamentation as S. crocea, but it does not have solorinic acid nor the subsequent orange-coloured medulla.

=== Similar species ===
Solorina crocoides, described by Vilmos Kőfaragó-Gyelnik in 1930, was named for its similarity with Solorina crocea. The sterile, non-fruiting version has similar chemical properties as its namesake; according to Krog and Swinscow, "The relationship between these two species needs further investigation".

Some lichens collected at high elevations in Nepal are similar in overall morphology to Solorina crocea, but feature some distinguishing characteristics: they have developments of the apothecia at the lobe margins reminiscent of lichens in the genus Peltigera, there are soredia-like structures on the lobe margins that can later develop into isidia-like lobules, and they have a thick layer (100–125 μm) of cyanobacteria, while missing the green algal layer in many parts of the thallus. These lichens have not been formally described as a new species.

=== Chemistry ===
Structural formula of solorinic acid

Several lichen products have been found in Solorina crocea, including several anthraquinones (solorinic acid, norsolorinic acid, averantin, averantin 6-O-monomethyl ether, and 4,4'-bissolorinic acid) and two depsides (methyl gyrophorate and gyrophoric acid). The presence of solorinic acid causes the medulla and lower thallus surface to yield a positive K spot test (K+, purple); this compound may also mask the results of the KC and C reactions. Solorinine is a novel amino acid that was reported from the lichen in 1994. A glycoside compound extracted from S. crocea and reported in 1994 – named 1-(O-α-D-glucopyranosyl)-3S,25R-hexacosanediol – was the first of its type (a "higher alcoholic glucoside") isolated from a lichen.

Three of the anthraquinones from Solorina crocea—norsolorinic acid, solorinic acid, and averantin 6-O-methyl ether—have been shown in laboratory experiments to inhibit the enzyme monoamine oxidase.

== Habitat and distribution ==
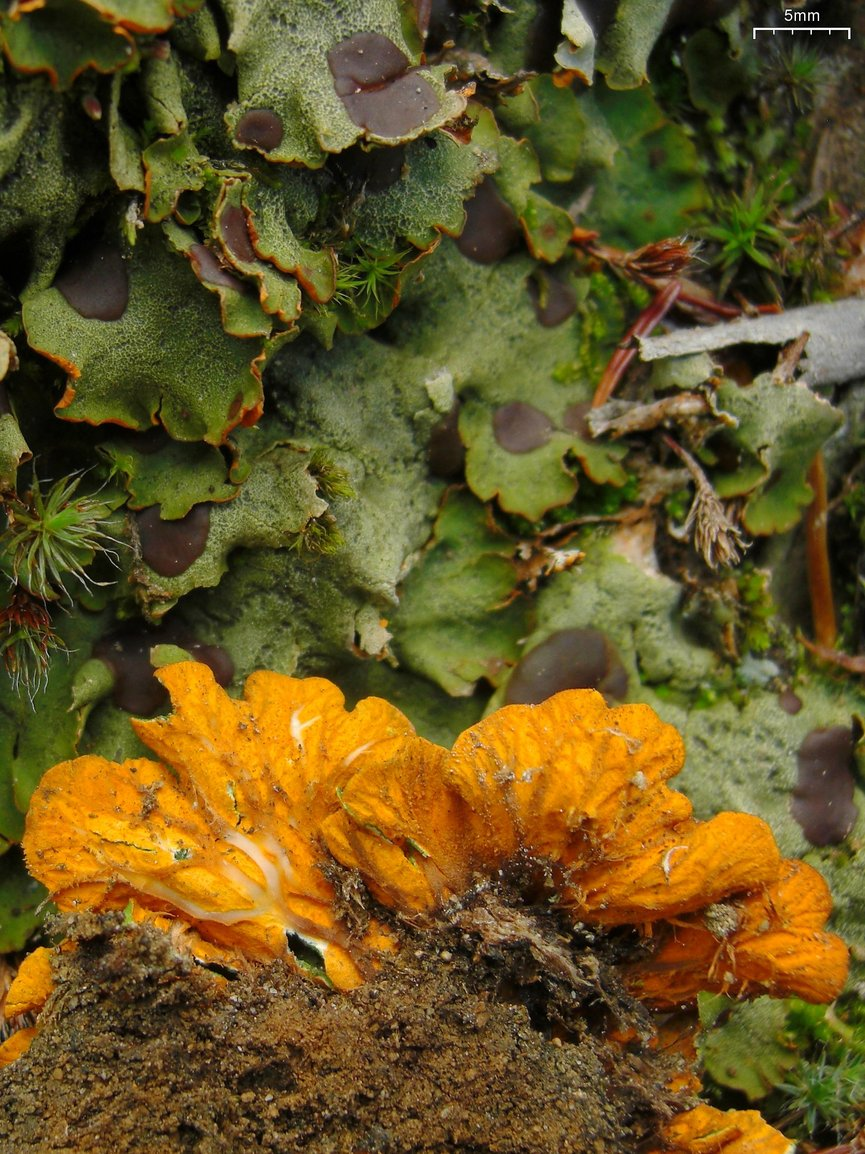
Image comparing the green upper thallus surface and the orange undersurface of Solorina crocea. Scale bar is 5 mm (3/16 in)

In North America its range extends from polar regions in alpine to subalpine habitats south to California and New Mexico. European countries in which the lichen has been recorded include Andorra, Austria, Bulgaria, Spain, Iceland, and Finland. In the UK, it occurs in the Scottish Highlands, and it is represented by a single record from Ireland. Its distribution in Italy is limited to the high-altitude Alps and the northern Apennines. In India, it is known from the Himalayas regions (Himachal Pradesh and Sikkim). Its range extends to the Eastern Himalayas, as it has been recorded from Xizang in Tibet at an altitude of 4,820 m (15,810 ft). In New Zealand, it has been collected from Mount Peel at an altitude of 1,350 m (4,430 ft).

Recorded habitats for the lichen include boulder fields, leached windswept ridges, and areas of solifluction. In Iceland, Solorina crocea occurs in Salix herbacea snowbeds and north-facing slopes with abundant grasses and sedges. Generally, the lichen occurs on the bare ground in sandy soil. It grows in soils that are both acid-rich and base-rich as a result of seepage from late-lying snow patches.

== Species interactions ==
Solorina crocea is often infected by Rhagadostoma lichenicola, a lichenicolous (lichen-dwelling) fungus. Infection results in the appearance of crowded blackish ascomata on the upper surface of the host thallus and a highly branched, dark mycelium below the fruitbodies. Its presence does not seem to affect the fertility of the lichen, suggesting that the fungus requires the function and integrity of the host to remain intact. The abundance of certain strains in the associated bacterial community of the lichen has been shown to be altered by the fungal infection. Bacteria normally associated with the lichen include members of the phyla Acidobacteriota, Planctomycetota, and Proteobacteria. Another lichenicolous fungus, Talpapellis solorinae, was described as a new species in 2015 from collections made in North Caucasus; it does not cause distinct damage to the infected host thallus. Other fungi that have been recorded infecting Solorina crocea include Arthonia peltigerina, Cercidospora punctillata, Corticifraga peltigerae, Cercidospora lichenicola, Pyrenidium actinellum, Stigmidium croceae, Protothelenella croceae, Thelocarpon epibolum, and Pronectria robergei. Infection by Stigmidium solorinarium results in the appearance of minute perithecia, while infection by Scutula tuberculosa will result in greyish to black lecideine apothecia.

== Research ==
Researchers have cloned a gene for polyketide synthase from Solorina crocea and transferred it to the filamentous fungus Aspergillus oryzae. Lichen polyketides are of general research interest for their role in the biosynthesis of a great number of secondary metabolites.

Laccases from the lichen have been purified and studied. These enzymes depolymerize and decolorize humic acids from soils, suggesting that the lichen is involved in the turnover and transformation of organic matter in the soil.

A metagenome of Solorina crocea was reported in 2022. In addition to the fungal component of the lichen, the metagenome contained DNA from its green algal photobiont partner Coccomyxa solorinae, from its cyanobiont partner Nostoc, as well as from a bacterium (family Caulobacteraceae), and a Trichoderma fungus.

== See also ==
- List of lichens named by Carl Linnaeus
