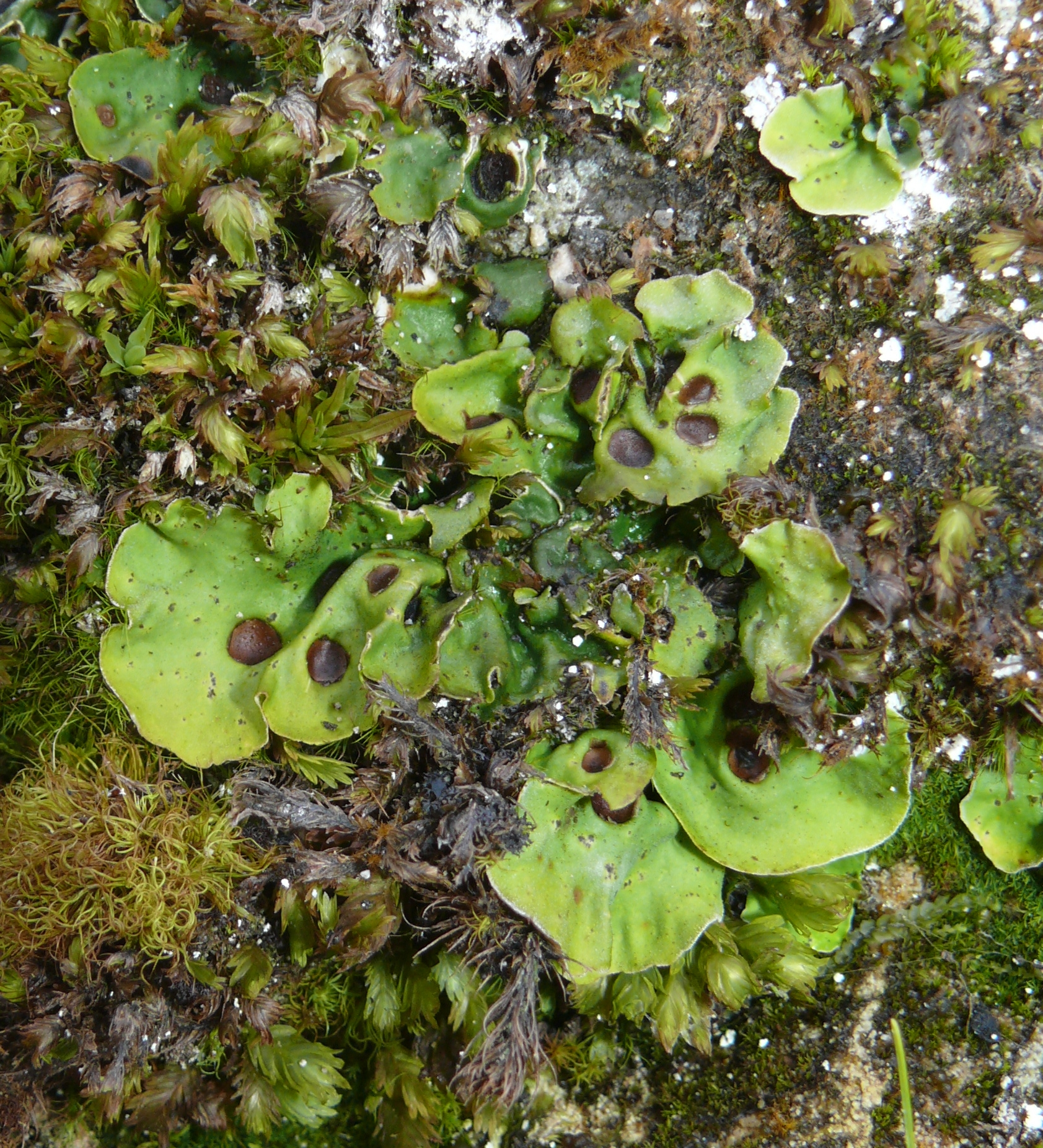
- Solorina saccata, Schwäbisch Alb, Germany

Conservation status
- Secure (NatureServe)

Scientific classification
- Kingdom: Fungi
- Division: Ascomycota
- Class: Lecanoromycetes
- Order: Peltigerales
- Family: Peltigeraceae
- Genus: Solorina
- Species: S. saccata

Binomial name
- Solorina saccata (L.) Ach. (1808)

Synonyms
- Arthonia saccata (L.) Ach. 1806; Platysma saccatum (L.) Frege 1812; Peltigera saccata (L.) DC. 1805; Peltidea saccata (L.) Ach. 1803; Lobaria saccata (L.) Hoffm. 1796; Lichen saccatus L. 1755

= Solorina saccata =

Species of lichen-forming fungus

Solorina saccata, commonly called chocolate chip lichen, is a lichen growing on calcareous rocks, usually in crevices and always in sheltered conditions. It is found from the mediterranean mountains up to the arctic. It differs from other alpine Solorina-species by the four two-cell spores in the asci.

== Taxonomy ==
It belongs to the genus Solorina of the family Peltigeraceae. It is also confused with Solorina simensis (Hochst. ex Flotow) in spore ornamentation and chemical properties as well as in its mainly plane apothecia and blue-green photobiont.

== See also ==
- List of lichens named by Carl Linnaeus
