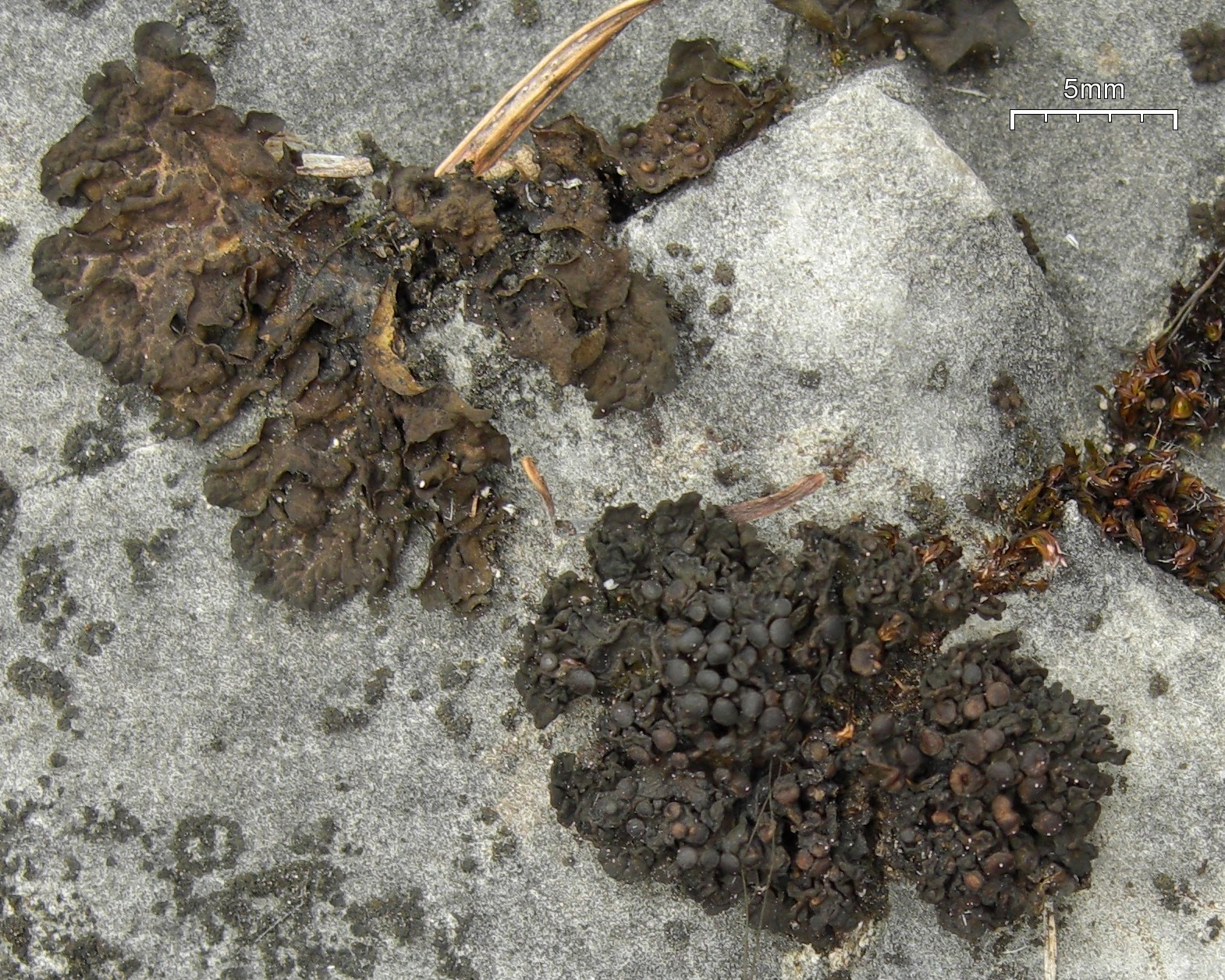

Scientific classification
- Kingdom: Fungi
- Division: Ascomycota
- Class: Lecanoromycetes
- Order: Peltigerales
- Family: Collemataceae
- Genus: Collema
- Species: C. coccophorum

Binomial name
- Collema coccophorum Tuck. (1862)

Synonyms
- Collema atrum F.Wilson (1891); Collema congestum F.Wilson (1891); Synechoblastus congesta (F.Wilson) F.Wilson (1893); Synechoblastus coccophorus (Tuck.) Fink (1909)

= Collema coccophorum =

Species of fungus

Collema coccophorum is a cyanolichen also known as soil pulp lichen or jelly lichen. It can be found in many areas of the world, including North America, Eastern Europe and Norway, Australia, and South America. It has also been recorded in Antarctica.
