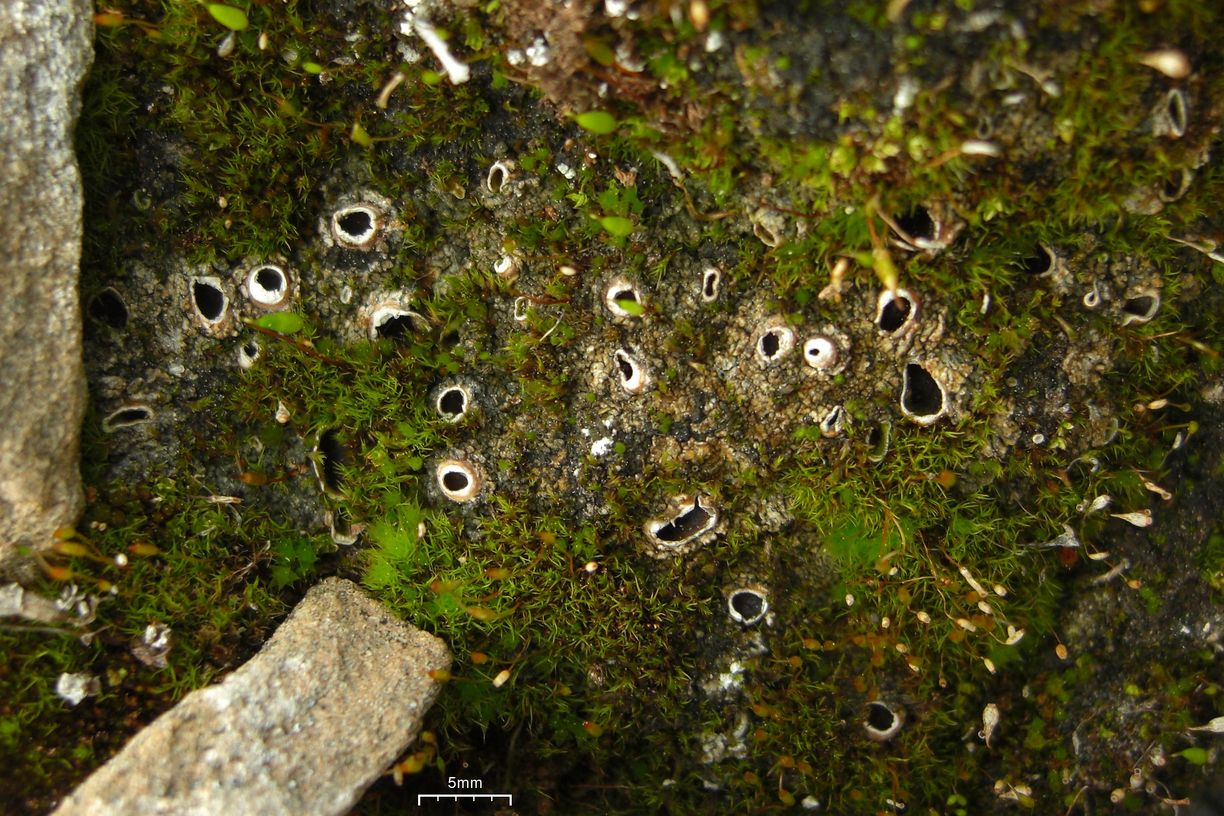

Conservation status
- Secure (NatureServe)

Scientific classification
- Kingdom: Fungi
- Division: Ascomycota
- Class: Lecanoromycetes
- Order: Peltigerales
- Family: Peltigeraceae
- Genus: Solorina
- Species: S. spongiosa

Binomial name
- Solorina spongiosa (Ach.) Anzi (1862)

Synonyms
- Collema spongiosum Ach. (1810); Parmelia spongiosa (Ach.) Spreng. (1827)

= Solorina spongiosa =

Species of lichen

Solorina spongiosa, commonly known as the fringed chocolate chip lichen, is a species of lichen in the family Peltigeraceae. It was first formally described as a new species by the Swedish lichenologist Erik Acharius as Collema spongiosum. Italian botanist Martino Anzi transferred it to the genus Solorina in 1862.

The tissue containing the photobiont green algae is limited to a ragged ring surrounding the apothecia. These concave fruiting structures are 1.5–4 mm (0.06–0.16 in) in diameter. Solorina spongiosa is typically found in regions with arctic to alpine tundra habitats, although in rare instances it has been recorded growing on the ground in shaded boreal habitats.
