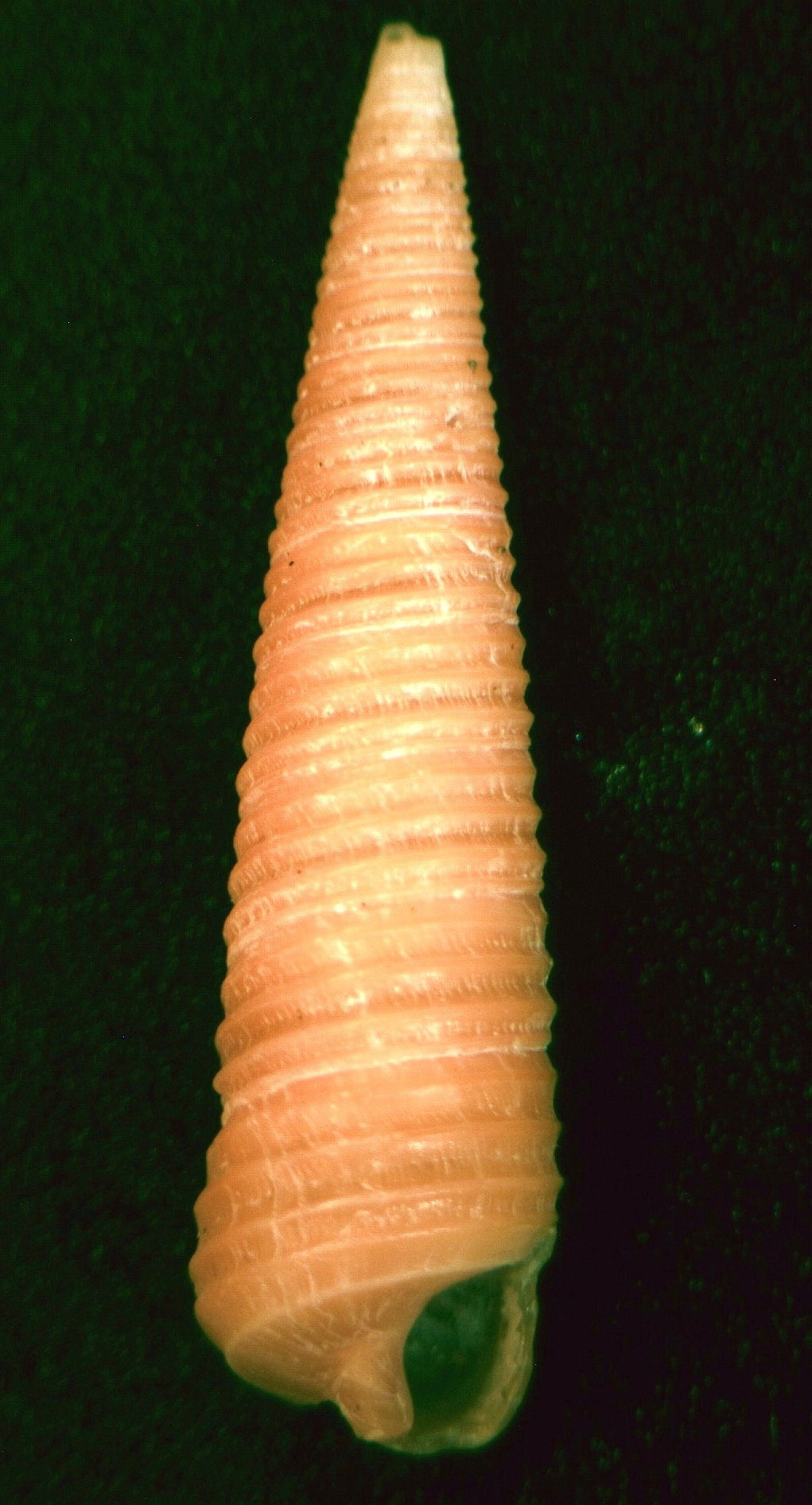
- A shell of Seila crocea

Scientific classification
- Kingdom: Animalia
- Phylum: Mollusca
- Class: Gastropoda
- Subclass: Caenogastropoda
- Order: incertae sedis
- Family: Cerithiopsidae
- Genus: Seila
- Species: S. crocea

Binomial name
- Seila crocea (Angas, 1871)

= Seila crocea =

Species of gastropod

Seila crocea is a species of small sea snail, a marine gastropod mollusc or micromollusc in the family Cerithiopsidae.
