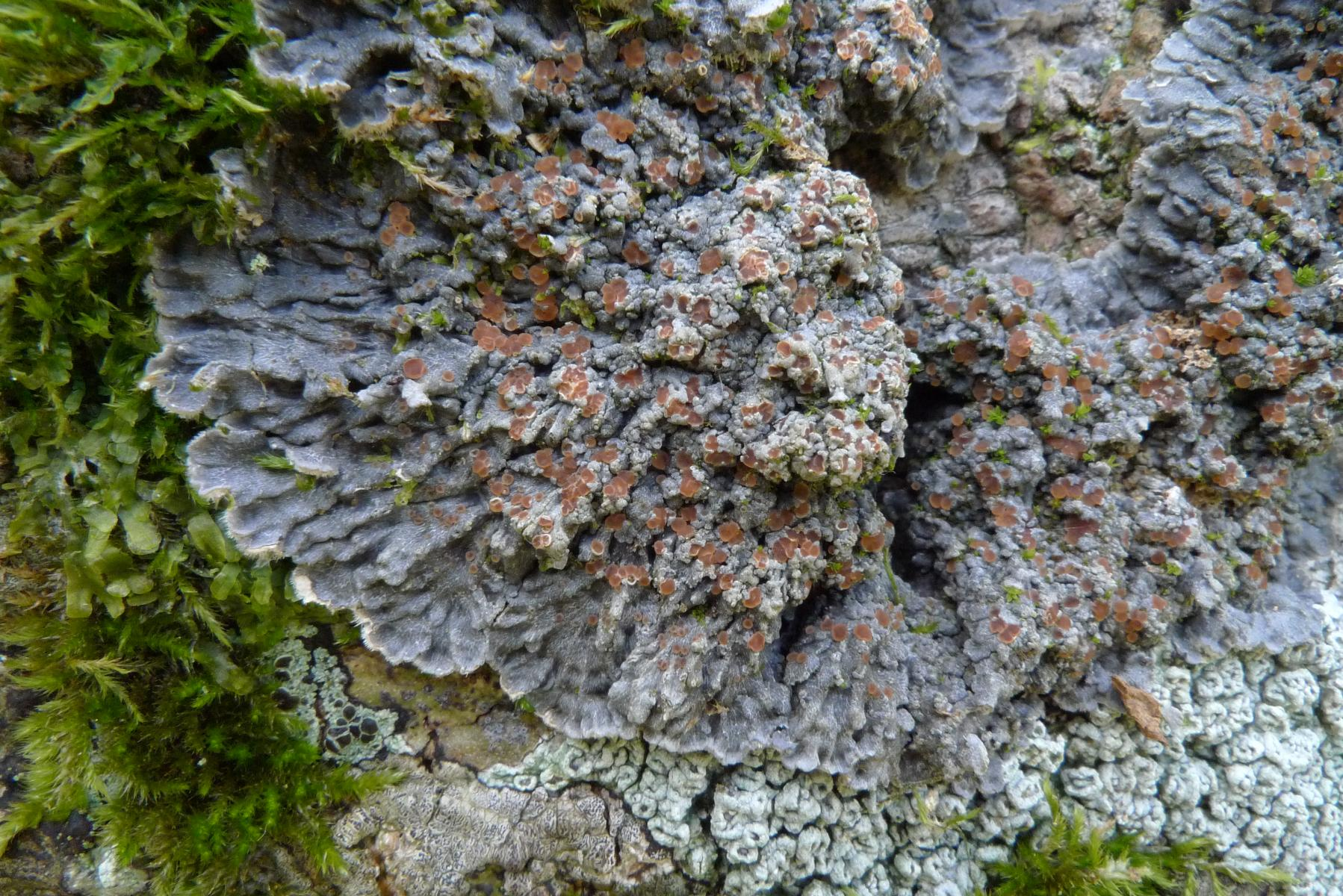
- Degelia plumbea in Brittany, France

Scientific classification
- Kingdom: Fungi
- Division: Ascomycota
- Class: Lecanoromycetes
- Order: Peltigerales
- Family: Pannariaceae
- Genus: Degelia
- Species: D. plumbea

Binomial name
- Degelia plumbea (Lightf.) P.M.Jørg. & P.James (1990)

Synonyms
- Lichen plumbeus Lightf. (1777) (basionym); Pectenia plumbea; Parmeliella plumbea

= Degelia plumbea =

Species of lichen

Degelia plumbea (also called blue felt lichen) is a species of grey to blue-black or brown foliose lichen in the genus Degelia. It mostly grows on trees in undisturbed woodlands but occasionally on coastal rocks. It is found widely in Britain and western Ireland as well as in America and Canada, as it grows in maritime Atlantic climates.

D. plumbea is highly sensitive to acid rain and climatic changes. D. plumbea and other lichen are highly sensitive to high light and have a high-water holding capacity. Other factors like method of dispersal and obtaining the appropriate substrate effects the growth and prosperity of the fungi. The genes in the D. plumbea do not share a common ancestral gene through speciation due to potential environmental changes.

Degelia cyanoloma was previously thought to be a variant of D. plumbea.

In 2022, the Canadian province of Nova Scotia formally declared blue felt lichen as its provincial lichen, becoming the first province in the country to designate a provincial lichen.
