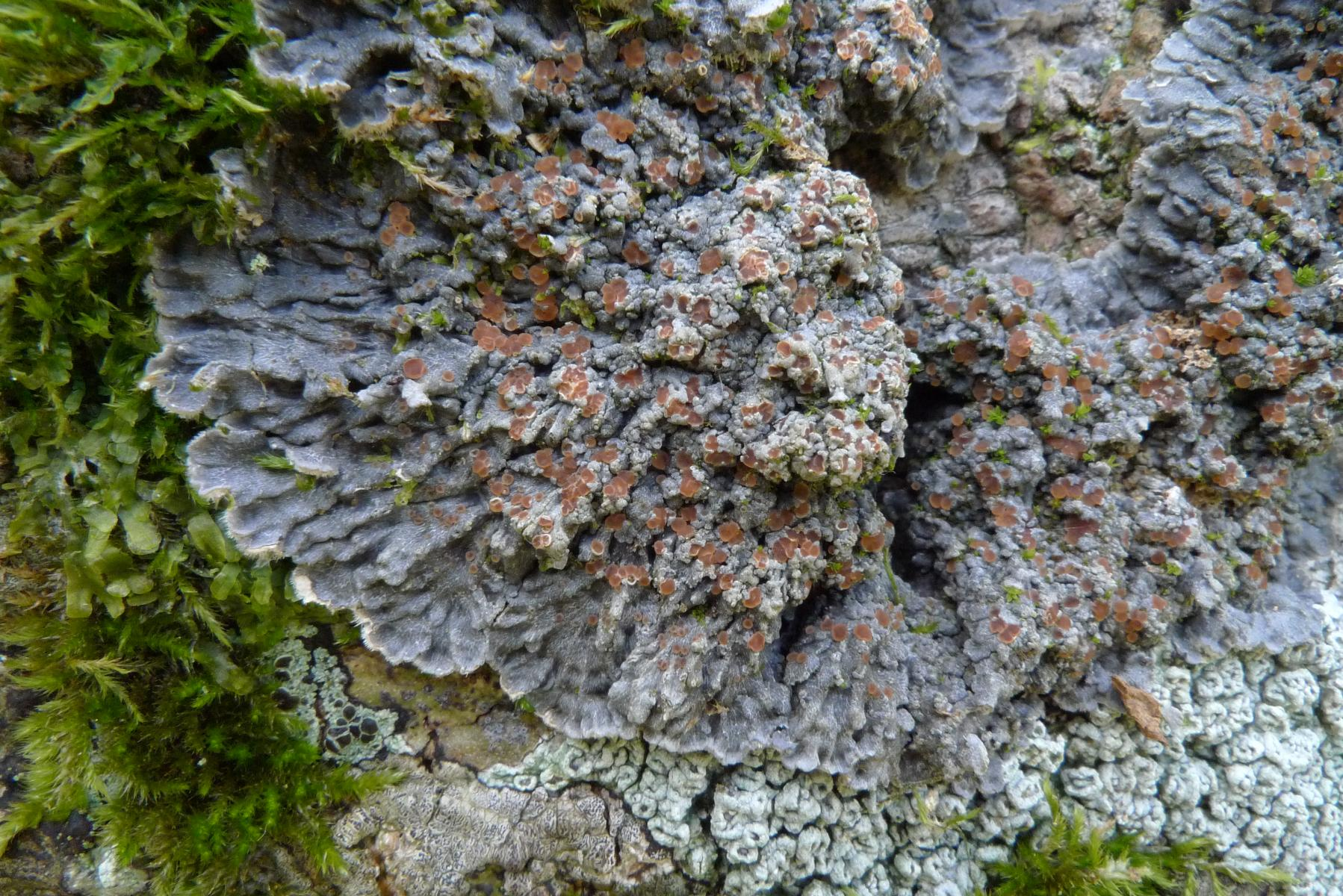
- Degelia plumbea

Scientific classification
- Domain: Eukaryota
- Kingdom: Fungi
- Division: Ascomycota
- Class: Lecanoromycetes
- Order: Peltigerales
- Family: Pannariaceae
- Genus: Degelia; Arv. & D.J.Galloway (1981)

Type species
- Degelia gayana (Mont.) Arv. & D.J.Galloway (1981)

= Degelia =

Genus of lichens in the family Pannariaceae

Degelia is a genus of lichen-forming fungi in the family Pannariaceae. The genus is named after Swedish lichenologist Gunnar Degelius.

The genus was circumscribed by Lars Arvidsson and David John Galloway in 1981.

== Species ==
- Degelia atlantica
- Degelia calcicola
- Degelia crustacea
- Degelia cyanoloma
- Degelia durietzii
- Degelia duplomarginata
- Degelia flabellata
- Degelia gayana
- Degelia ligulata
- Degelia neozelandica
- Degelia periptera
- Degelia plumbea
- Degelia rosulata
- Degelia subcrustata
