= Serra de Montejunto Protected Landscape =

Protected area in Portugal

Coordinates: 39°10′30″N 9°03′00″W

- IUCN category V (protected landscape/seascape)
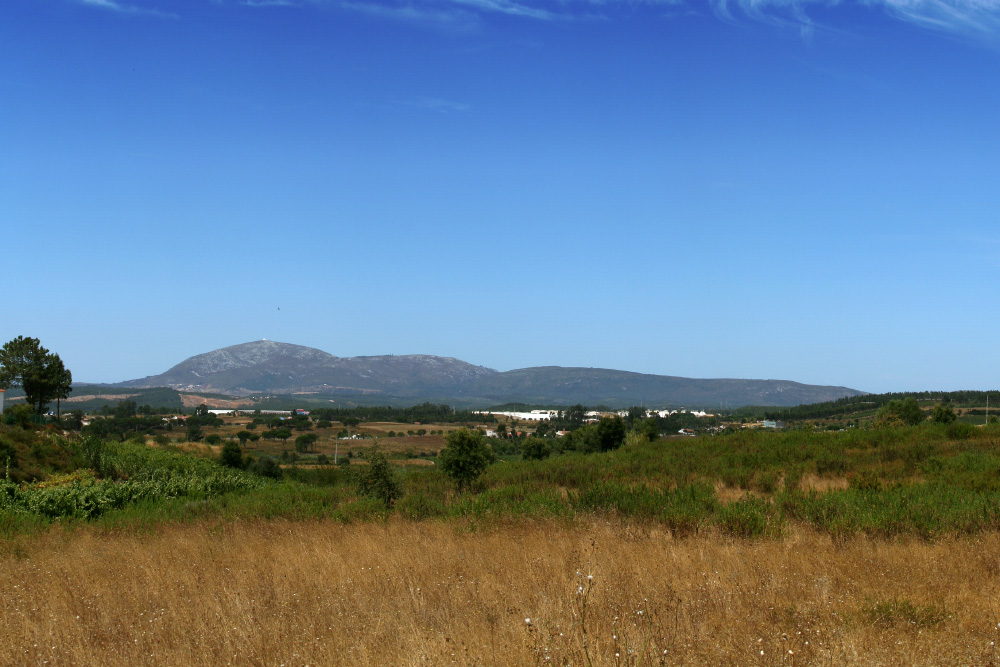
- Serra de Montejunto

- Location within Portugal
- Area: 48.97 km^{2} (18.91 sq mi)
- Established: 1999
- Governing body: ICNF

Serra de Montejunto Protected Landscape is a protected landscape in the Montejunto-Estrela mountain range, spanning the municipalities of Alenquer and Cadaval in Lisbon District, Portugal. It is the highest natural viewpoint of Estremadura, rising to 666 metres (2,185 ft) of altitude. The area is part of the Estremenho Limestone Massif. Geologically is 15 kilometres (9.3 mi) long and 7 kilometres (4.3 mi) wide, and is rich in caves, sewage ponds and prehistoric fossils.

== Fauna and flora ==
Serra de Montejunto Protected Landscape is particularly noted for its colony of Miniopterus schreibersi, with a cave in Cadaval being classified as an Important National Bat Roost, with several thousand roosting during the winter months. Flora found in the area include Arabis sadina, Coincya cintrana, Juncus valvatus, Narcissus calcicola and Silene longicilia.
