= Leptogium menziesii =

Scientific classification
- Kingdom: Fungi
- Division: Ascomycota
- Class: Lecanoromycetes
- Order: Peltigerales
- Family: Collemataceae
- Genus: Leptogium
- Species: L. menziesii

Binomial name
- Leptogium menziesii (Sm.) Mont. (1852)

Synonyms
- Lichen menziesii Sm. (1803); Parmelia menziesii (Sm.) Ach. (1803); Collema menziesii (Sm.) Ach. (1810); Lichen furvus * menziesii (Sm.) Lam. (1813)

Species of lichen-forming fungus

Leptogium menziesii is a species of jelly lichen in the family Collemataceae. This dark, foliose lichen typically forms broad, overlapping lobes with a felted, beard-like underside of hairs. Its thallus (lichen body) and fruiting rims are unornamented, and the bases of the discs and the tiny asexual structures (pycnidia) are hairy; these features help separate it from similar Antarctic and subantarctic species. It is chiefly a subantarctic species, with records from southern South America and several southern hemisphere islands.

== Taxonomy ==
The species was first brought into print in Erik Acharius's Methodus (1803), where it appears under his collematoid section. Acharius placed it in Parmelia ("Parmelia Menziesii") and at the same time credited James Edward Smith's manuscript name "Lichen Menziesii D. D. Smith. Msc.". He gave a brief Latin diagnosis of a gelatinous, somewhat membranous, brownish-green thallus, white-tomentose beneath, with rounded, plane lobes and red, pedicellate, bell-shaped apothecia, and recorded the habitat as the Strait of Magellan based on collections by Archibald Menzies. Acharius later transferred the species to Collema as Collema menziesii (1810). The currently accepted combination, Leptogium menziesii, was published by Camille Montagne in 1852. The type material was collected by Menzies on Staten Island near Cape Horn in February 1789; in 1975 Per Magnus Jørgensen designated a neotype from this gathering, which is preserved in the herbarium of the Royal Botanic Garden Edinburgh (E).

== Description ==
The thallus is about 7 cm across and 50–75 micrometres (μm) thick, brownish-grey in fluorescent light and greenish-grey under a stereomicroscope. Lobes are broad (to about 10 mm), overlapping and appressed; their tips are rounded and smooth, and the margins are thin and even. Isidia (tiny detachable outgrowths used for clonal spread) and lobules (small flap-like propagules) are absent. Attachment is by abundant simple hairs that become "beard-like" as they agglutinate; the lower surface is tomentose (felted). The upper cortex is a single layer of brick-like (paraplectenchymatous) cells; the lower cortex is likewise single-layered and felted. In section, the medulla shows the fungal hyphae compactly woven with the cyanobacteria; columnar (pillar-like) hyphae were not seen in the studied material, although the authors caution that rapid drying may have obscured them.

Fruiting bodies (apothecia) of L. menziesii are small (to about 1.5 mm), laminal and short-stalked. The apothecial discs are concave and their margins smooth to slightly wrinkled, without any lobules or warting. The apothecial wall lacks a proper exciple; the hypothecium (the tissue beneath the spore layer) is built of elongated cells (prosoplectenchymatous), whereas the parahymenial tissue is brick-like (paraplectenchymatous). Ascospores were not observed in the material examined; in earlier work they were reported as having dimensions of 22–27 × 8–10 μm. Pycnidia occur on the thallus, usually near the margin, producing slender conidia about 3.75 × 1.25 μm. The bases of both apothecia and pycnidia are covered by hairs.

=== Similar species ===
Within the Antarctic and subantarctic species of Leptogium, L. menziesii lacks any vegetative ornamentation on the thallus or apothecial rim. It has single-layered cortices and a beard-like tomentum of agglutinated hairs, whereas L. puberulum has thicker cortices (more than one cell layer) and a velvety set of short, simple hairs. The new Antarctic species described in the same work (L. antarcticum, L. marcellii, L. tectum) each have either ornamentation, lobules, or different attachment anatomy.

== Habitat and distribution ==
Leptogium menziesii is subantarctic in character. The species was first collected in the Strait of Magellan area and is recorded from the Falkland Islands and South Georgia, with additional southern hemisphere records from Australia, Chile, Japan, New Zealand and Uruguay; other sources also list Peru. The lichen grows in dry herbfield and grassland, on or amongst bryophytes including Syntrichia robusta, Acaena magellanica, and Festuca contracta. In South Georgia it has been documented growing amongst Tortula robusta and, less frequently, in damp hollows on Chorisodontium and Polytrichum banks.
