= Leptogium patwardhanii =

Scientific classification
- Kingdom: Fungi
- Division: Ascomycota
- Class: Lecanoromycetes
- Order: Peltigerales
- Family: Collemataceae
- Genus: Leptogium
- Species: L. patwardhanii

Binomial name
- Leptogium patwardhanii A.Dube & Makhija (2010)

Species of lichen

Leptogium patwardhanii is a species of corticolous (bark-dwelling) and foliose lichen in the family Collemataceae. Found in India, it was formally described as a new species in 2010 by Archana Dube and Urmila Vasudev Makhija. The type specimen was collected in an evergreen forest in Amboli (Maharashtra) at an elevation of 690 m (2,260 ft). It is only known to occur at the type locality.

Characteristics of Leptogium patwardhanii include the presence of isidia and the multilayered cortex of the thalline exciple. Its ascospores are muriform (divided into internal chambers by a single vertical septum and 3 to 5 transverse septa), ellipsoid, and measure 20–40 by 11–13 μm. It is classified in the section Euleptogium of the genus Leptogium. Leptogium austroamericanum and L. cyanescens are similar in overall morphology, but can be distinguished from L. patwardhanii by differences in the structure of their proper exciples (the rim of tissue around the apothecia).
