= Leptogium mantiqueirense =

Scientific classification
- Kingdom: Fungi
- Division: Ascomycota
- Class: Lecanoromycetes
- Order: Peltigerales
- Family: Collemataceae
- Genus: Leptogium
- Species: L. mantiqueirense

Binomial name
- Leptogium mantiqueirense Kitaura & Marcelli (2013)

Species of lichen-forming fungus

Leptogium mantiqueirense is a species of lichen-forming fungus in the family Collemataceae. Found in Brazil, it was described as a new species in 2013.

== Taxonomy ==
Leptogium mantiqueirense was described as a new species by Marcos Kitaura and Marcelo Marcelli, with the type collected in Brazil (Minas Gerais) in Itatiaia National Park on the trunk of a tree. It is treated in Leptogium section Mallotium, and the species is noted for apothecia (fruiting bodies) that may show a distinctive lamellar "collar", a feature the authors use to help separate collar-bearing apothecia from those with true lobules.

== Description ==
The body (thallus) is 1.5–4.0 cm across and grey to dark grey, with a dull, matt surface. The lobes are up to 3 mm wide, irregularly overlapping and attached at scattered points, with rounded tips that curve slightly downward (somewhat revolute). The upper surface is smooth to slightly wrinkled, while the lower side is yellowish grey to whitish, covered with fine hairs. Isidia (vegetative outgrowths) and lobules are absent.

The thallus is attached to the substrate by hairs rather than by the root-like structures (rhizines or hapters) found in many related lichens; these are absent, while unbranched hairs occur on the lower surface and also near the fruiting bodies on the upper surface. The fruiting bodies (apothecia) are up to 6 mm in diameter and develop on the lobe surface (laminal). They may become somewhat raised with age, and the disc is concave when young, flattening to flat or concave when older. The apothecia can bear a frilly collar made of one or two (rarely three) wavy, crisped plates (lamellae), sometimes appearing as semicircular lobelets fused at the base; a corona is absent.

== Habitat and distribution ==
The species is known from the type locality in southeastern Brazil, where it was collected in Itatiaia National Park (Minas Gerais) growing on a tree trunk. It has also been documented in São Paulo.
