= Leptogium burgessii =

Scientific classification
- Kingdom: Fungi
- Division: Ascomycota
- Class: Lecanoromycetes
- Order: Peltigerales
- Family: Collemataceae
- Genus: Leptogium
- Species: L. burgessii

Binomial name
- Leptogium burgessii (L.) Mont. (1840)

Synonyms
- Lichen burgessii L. (1774); Parmelia burgessii (L.) Ach. (1803); Collema burgessii (L.) Ach. (1810); Mallotium burgessii (L.) Gray (1821)

Species of lichen-forming fungus

Leptogium burgessii is a species of foliose lichen in the family Collemataceae. The species was originally described by Carl Linnaeus in 1774 and transferred to Leptogium by Camille Montagne in 1840. It forms leafy greyish to brownish patches distinguished by a velvety lower surface covered with short cream-coloured hairs composed of spherical cells. In Europe, L. burgessii has an oceanic Atlantic distribution, occurring from the Canary Islands through north-western Iberia to south-western Norway, where it grows on tree bark and mossy rocks in humid forests. The lichen requires high air humidity and is typically found in well-preserved old deciduous woodland, often growing over mosses on broad-leaved trees such as ash. Although the species has been reported from other continents including Africa, Asia, and South America, molecular studies indicate that many extra-European records may represent closely related but distinct species.

== Taxonomy ==
The taxonomy of Leptogium burgessii traces back to the Swedish taxonomist Carl Linnaeus, who first described the species as Lichen burgessii in the 13th edition of his 1774 work Systema Naturae. In his brief Latin diagnosis he characterised it as a foliose lichen with somewhat overlapping, crisp, translucent lobes and "shields" (apothecia) that are raised, roughened and crinkled, with flat, shining discs and a crisped margin. Linnaeus also cited "Burgess. mss.", indicating that he based the species on material or a manuscript name communicated by Rev. John Burgess, an 18th-century Scottish clergyman and lichen enthusiast who collected and described the species and sent it to Linnaeus.

Later work on the Linnaean lichen herbarium has clarified how this name was established and typified. Per Magnus Jørgensen and co-authors showed that many lichen specimens and annotations there are by Linnaeus's son, Carl Linnaeus the Younger, and that all eight lichens sent by Burgess in 1771 are annotated by the son, including Lichen burgessii. In Systema Naturae Linnaeus provided a new Latin diagnostic phrase for the species, but based it directly on the phrase-name Burgess had used in a letter dated 20 May 1771. The corresponding specimen was located on sheet LINN 1273.91, originally labelled "crispus" and later altered to "burgessii"; on the back of the sheet is a phrase-name close to Burgess's original wording. Jørgensen and co-authors designated the left-hand specimen on this sheet as lectotype, thereby fixing the application of the name Lichen burgessii to the taxon now known as Leptogium burgessii (L.) Mont.; thin-layer chromatography of the type material showed no detectable lichen secondary metabolites.

Subsequent lichenologists transferred the species through several genera before it reached its current placement. Erik Acharius moved Lichen burgessii to Parmelia in 1803, and later to Collema in 1810. Samuel Frederick Gray then treated it as Mallotium burgessii in 1821. The currently accepted combination dates from 1840, when Camille Montagne transferred Linnaeus's species to Leptogium as Leptogium burgessii in Webb and Berthelot's Histoire naturelle des Îles Canaries. In that treatment he provided a detailed Latin description under the new name, listed earlier uses of the epithet as Lichen burgessii in John Lightfoot's Flora Scotica and in English Botany, and cited its subsequent recombinations in Parmelia and Collema by Acharius, Sprengel, Hoffmann and Hooker. Montagne based his account on material collected by Jean Marie Despréaux on tree bark in the woods of Las Mercedes on Tenerife, and Leptogium burgessii is the name now generally accepted.

A modern revision by Marcos Kitaura and Marcelo Marcelli places Leptogium burgessii in section Mallotium, a group of Leptogium species characterised by short hairs composed of spherical cells on one or both thallus surfaces. In that study they re-examined type material of L. burgessii and related taxa, and followed earlier authors in treating the Mexican species Leptogium inflexum as a synonym of L. burgessii, but did so "reluctantly", noting anatomical differences and the possibility that L. burgessii may be confined to Europe while L. inflexum occurs in the Americas. The same study rejected the earlier view that the African species Leptogium ethiopicum is the same species as L. burgessii, pointing to differences in lobe margins and apothecial anatomy.

== Description ==
Leptogium burgessii forms relatively large, leafy thalli usually up to about 7–10 cm across, arranged as rounded tufts or rosettes that are often slightly raised in the centre. The thallus is divided into rounded, wavy lobes mostly 3–5 mm wide that overlap irregularly and are attached to the substrate at scattered points. When dry, the surface is bluish grey to dark blackish brown or blackish olive-green, with a dull, matt appearance; under low magnification it looks smooth to only slightly wrinkled. The lobe tips are rounded and slightly rolled inwards, and the margins are gently undulating. Numerous small secondary lobes (folioles or lacinules) with rounded tips arise both from the lobe edges and around the rims of the fruiting bodies, giving the margins a distinctly frilled outline. The thallus lacks isidia.

The lower surface is paler, grey to yellowish, and has a velvety texture due to a dense covering of short, cream-coloured hairs. These hairs, which are made up of only a few spherical cells, are abundant on the underside and may also occur near the apothecia on the upper surface; they anchor the lichen to the bark and are characteristic of the group of Leptogium species placed in section Mallotium. Fruiting bodies (apothecia) are fairly common. They are laminal and slightly stalked, usually 1–4 mm in diameter, with a cup-shaped, red-brown to blackish-brown disc surrounded by a thick thalline margin. The margin and the outer wall of the apothecium (the amphithecium) bear numerous small lobules, which remain free and do not form a complete collar around the disc. In vertical section the apothecia have a tall spore-bearing layer and a conspicuously thick outer zone composed of many layers of small, brick-like fungal cells (paraplectenchymatous tissue). The ascospores are fusiform, 30–40 × 12–18 μm, with 5–7 transverse and several longitudinal septa; they are divided internally into a muriform, brick-like pattern.

== Habitat and distribution ==
In his 1840 account, Montagne reported Leptogium burgessii on the bark of trees in the woods of Las Mercedes on Tenerife in the Canary Islands, based on collections by Jean-Marie Despréaux, indicating a corticolous species of humid laurel forest. Within the Iberian Peninsula the species has been recorded only from a few localities in north-western Portugal. There it grows on mossy tree trunks and on moss-covered rocks inside dense, well-preserved Atlantic broadleaved forest under very humid, oceanic conditions. These stands host rich communities of cyanobacterial lichens in the Lobarion pulmonariae alliance, and L. burgessii often occurs with species such as Leptogium juressianum, Scytinium lichenoides, Lobaria pulmonaria, Nephroma parile and Pannaria conoplea. On the basis of earlier floristic work summarised by Aragón and co-authors, L. burgessii is regarded in Europe as an oceanic element with an Atlantic distribution from Macaronesia northwards to Norway, and there are scattered extra-European records from South America, East Africa, India and New Zealand. In Fennoscandia it is restricted to south-western Norway, where Haugan and co-authors reported 16 localities in the nemoral to boreonemoral zone and in the lowland belt of the coastal section, from about sea level up to 170 m, all in the counties Rogaland, Hordaland and Sogn og Fjordane.

In Norway the species has a western, oceanic distribution, requiring high air humidity and mild winters. Haugan and colleagues found it on more or less mossy rocks and rock walls and on tree trunks, most often in old broad-leaved deciduous forest within the traditional cultural landscape; when corticolous it usually grew over mosses, especially on pollarded trunks of Fraxinus excelsior, which appeared to be its principal host, but isolated thalli also occurred on Populus tremula, Quercus and Ulmus glabra. Holtan reported a new locality at Brusdalsvatnet in Skodje, Møre og Romsdal, which moved the known Norwegian northern limit about 150 km northwards from Atløy in Askvoll (Sunnfjord). At this site, around 26 m above sea level, L. burgessii grows on the trunks of rowan (Sorbus aucuparia) and, more rarely, elm (Ulmus glabra) and hazel (Corylus avellana) in a shaded, north-facing grey alder–elm forest with long continuity and high annual rainfall of about 2,150 mm. More than 100 thalli were found on at least 30 trees, and the lichen occurred exclusively on bark there, not on rock. The stand supports numerous other oceanic and "rainforest" lichens, including all four local Lobaria species, and Holtan regarded the occurrence of L. burgessii and its associates as of high phytogeographical interest; at that time the species was listed as Vulnerable on the Norwegian national red list.

In East Africa, specimens matching the L. burgessii morphotype have been reported from shady montane forests and from the ericaceous belt between about 1,900 and 3,500 m altitude. Molecular work on these East African collections shows that they fall into at least two lineages, occurring in upper montane Podocarpus and Erica forests on Mount Kilimanjaro and in lower-montane Ocotea forests on Kilimanjaro and in the Taita Hills. The authors considered it likely that true L. burgessii is represented among these lineages but cautioned that earlier East African records probably combine several closely related taxa, including Leptogium ethiopicum, so the extra-European range of L. burgessii remains uncertain.

A study of hairy Leptogium species in western North America reached similar conclusions for the group more generally. Stone and McCune noted that early descriptions of these lichens were often so brief that different species were lumped together, and that many collections worldwide have been placed in a few broadly defined species, giving the impression of very wide distributions; molecular data instead show that diversity in the group is higher than previously recognised. Taken together, these findings suggest that published records of L. burgessii outside its Atlantic European range should be treated with caution until they have been checked using modern anatomical and molecular methods.

== See also ==
- List of lichens named by Carl Linnaeus
