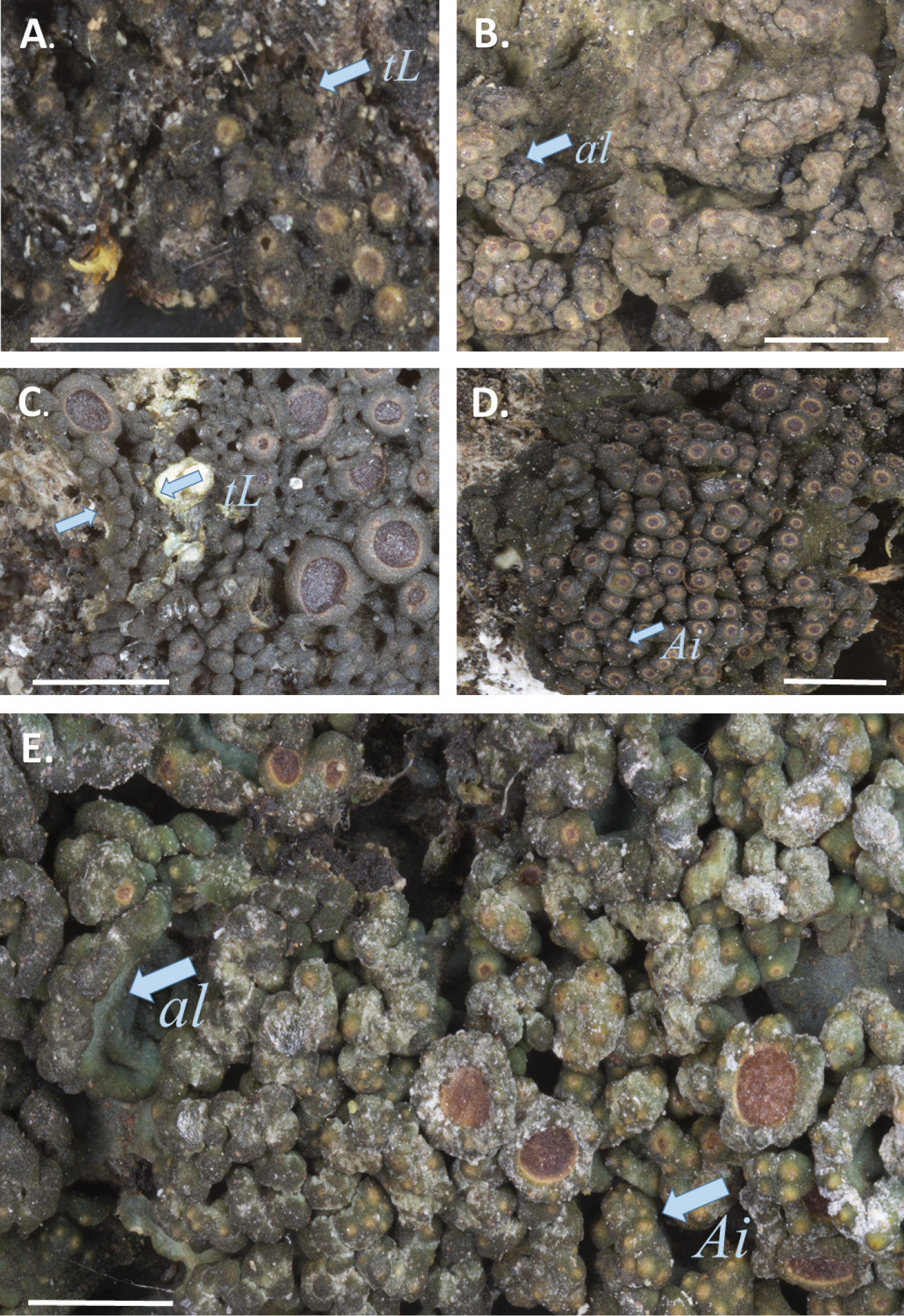
- Thalli and apothecia of several Rostania spp: A: R. occultata var. populina B: R. multipunctata C: R. ceranisca D: R. laevispora E: R. callibotrys. Scale bar: 1 cm.

Scientific classification
- Domain: Eukaryota
- Kingdom: Fungi
- Division: Ascomycota
- Class: Lecanoromycetes
- Order: Peltigerales
- Family: Collemataceae
- Genus: Rostania; Trevis. (1880)

Type species
- Rostania quadrata (J.Lahm ex Körb.) Trevis. (1880)

Species
- R. callibotrys R. ceranisca R. coccophylla R. effusa R. laevispora R. multipunctata R. occultata R. pallida R. populina

= Rostania =

Genus of lichens

Rostania is a genus of lichen-forming fungi in the family Collemataceae. These lichens are primarily found on tree bark, occasionally on wood, with one species known to inhabit soil. The genus is characterized morphologically by having minute thalli made of hyphal tissue without a separate cortex, and the more or less cuboid-shaped ascospores.

== Taxonomy ==
The genus was originally circumscribed in 1880 by Italian botanist Vittore Benedetto Antonio Trevisan de Saint-Léon.

In its new, restricted sense, following its revision using molecular phylogenetics and subsequent resurrection, Rostania is equivalent to the Collema occultatum group as defined by Gunnar Degelius in 1954. The taxonomy of the non-monophyletic taxon Rostania occultata is recently been clarified, and revised generic limitations of the genus proposed, such that some species have been excluded and transferred to other genera.

== Description ==
Rostania features lichens with a somewhat crustose to minutely foliose thallus that is relatively small, measuring 0.3 to 2.5 cm (0.1 to 1.0 in) in diameter. These lichens exhibit dark olive green, black, or brownish colours and can either form a diffuse granular crust or have poorly developed lobes up to 1 or 2 mm wide. The lobes are smooth to ridged and lack a true cortex. The medulla consists of hyphal structures intermingled with chains of Nostoc photobiont cells; a tomentum is absent in Rostania species.

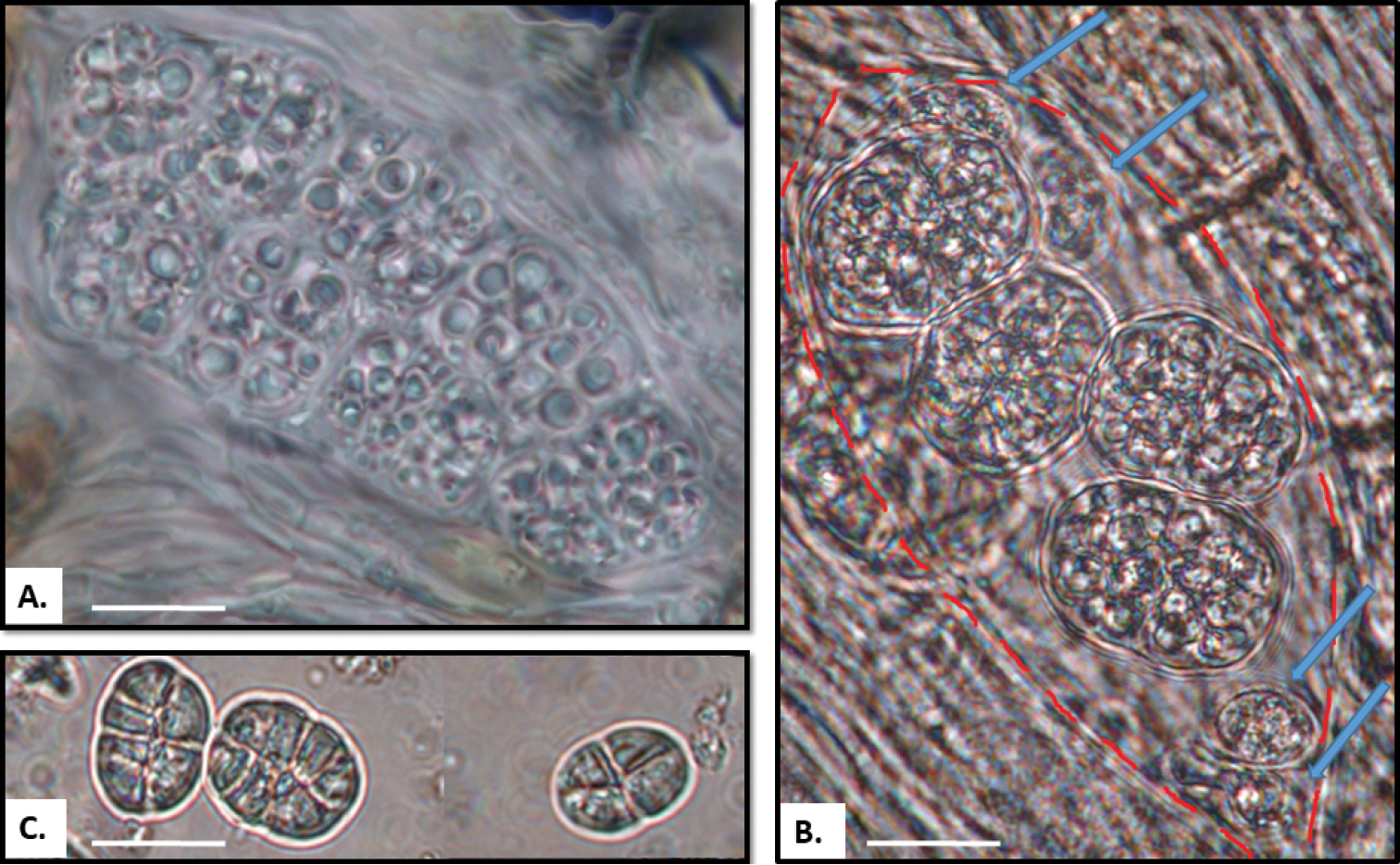
Ascospores of Rostania spp: A: R. occultata var. populina, cubic spores B: R. ceranisca, oblong spores; ascus (red line) with only four mature spores visible but remnants of four aborted spores can be seen (arrows) C: R. callibotrys, oblong spores. Scale bar: 10 μm.

Isidia are not present in this genus; however, accessory teretiform lobules (i.e., small, cylindrical extensions) may develop from lobes. The apothecia are laminal, sessile, and urceolate, resembling perithecia in their early stages. The disc colour ranges from very pale brownish to dark red-brown. The thalline margin is distinct and smooth, either entire or lobulate, and may become excluded over time. The epithecium is colourless to reddish-brown and does not react with a solution of potassium hydroxide or ammonia. The hymenium is colourless and turns blue when exposed to iodine. The hypothecium is shallow, either colourless or pale yellowish.

The hamathecium comprises numerous, conglutinate paraphyses that are mostly unbranched, with somewhat swollen apices. The asci are clavate and contain two, four, or eight spores, with the wall and apical dome turning blue in response to potassium hydroxide and iodine. The ascospores are broadly cylindrical to more or less spherical, often cuboid, and muriform. Conidiomata may be present in some species, embedded within the thallus. The conidia are bacilliform and hyaline. No lichen products have been detected in Rostania species using thin-layer chromatography.

== Species ==
As of April 2023, Species Fungorum (in the Catalogue of Life) accepts 9 species of Rostania.

- Rostania callibotrys (Tuck.) Otálora, P.M.Jørg. & Wedin (2013)
- Rostania ceranisca (Nyl.) Otálora, P.M.Jørg. & Wedin (2013)
- Rostania coccophylla (Nyl.) Otálora, P.M.Jørg. & Wedin (2013)
- Rostania effusa A.Košuth., M.Westb. & Wedin (2022)
- Rostania laevispora (Swinscow & Krog) Otálora, P.M.Jørg. & Wedin (2013)
- Rostania multipunctata (Degel.) Otálora, P.M.Jørg. & Wedin (2013)
- Rostania pallida A.Košuth., M.Westb. & Wedin (2022)
- Rostania occultata (Bagl.) Otálora, P.M.Jørg. & Wedin (2013)
- Rostania populina (Th.Fr.) A.Košuth., M.Westb. & Wedin (2022)

Because Rostania callibotrys does not group with Rostania in molecular phylogenetic analysis (instead forming an unsupported group with Enchylium), Košuthová and colleagues suggest that its placement in this genus is uncertain. Rostania laevispora is rarely collected and has not yet had its DNA analysed, but its morphology suggests a close relationship with R. callibotrys. Another seldom-collected species, R. coccophylla, may be better placed in the genus Collema.

The taxon once known as Rostania quadrifida (D.F.Stone & McCune) McCune (2014) is now Scytinium quadrifidum. Rostania paramensis (P.M.Jørg. & Palice) P.M.Jørg. & Palice (2015) was transferred to Leptogium, as Leptogium paramense.
