= Leptogium tectum =

Scientific classification
- Kingdom: Fungi
- Division: Ascomycota
- Class: Lecanoromycetes
- Order: Peltigerales
- Family: Collemataceae
- Genus: Leptogium
- Species: L. tectum

Binomial name
- Leptogium tectum A.P.Lorenz, Kitaura & Scur (2018)
- Holotype: James Ross Island, Antarctica

Species of lichen

Leptogium tectum is a species of saxicolous (rock-dwelling) rock-dwelling jelly lichen in the family Collemataceae, found in the maritime Antarctic. The thallus (lichen body) forms packed, ascending lobes and short scales (squamules) whose edges can be slightly wrinkled and warted; tiny clonal outgrowths (isidia) occur on one or both surfaces. Unlike many related species, it does not have hairs on the underside; instead, it anchors by a mesh of interwoven fungal hyphae that spread through fine sediments beneath the thallus.

== Taxonomy ==
Leptogium tectum was described as a new species in 2018 by Aline Lorenz, Marcos Kitaura, and Mayara Scur. The holotype is from Clearwater Mesa, James Ross Island (Antarctica), where it grew in a small wind-scoured hollow in basaltic rock. The epithet is from Latin tectus ("covered, hidden"), reflecting that both known specimens were collected inside hollows. The authors note that L. tectum is similar to L. puberulum but differs in its agglomerated, ascending lobes bearing marginal isidia and, crucially, in its attachment by interwoven hyphae rather than hairs.

== Description ==
The thallus of L. tectum is about 1.5–2.0 cm across and 75–150 μm thick, appearing blackish-grey to dark brown-grey; lobes or squamules are 2–4 mm wide, crowded and slightly attached, with rounded, ascending tips. Margins range from smooth to irregularly ornamented and may look a little "crisped". Wart-like (verruciform) outgrowths occur mainly along the margins, and isidia are granular to short-cylindrical (about 0.10–0.15 × 0.075–0.10 mm), grouped on the broader lobes and found on one or both surfaces; lobules are absent. The upper cortex is a single cell layer; the lower cortex is non-tomentose (not felted), light brown to yellowish, and one to three cell layers thick. In section, the medulla shows scarce, short pillar-like "columnar" hyphae standing between tightly packed cyanobacterial cells—the partnership that swells and softens when wet and gives "jelly lichens" their texture. No apothecia (sexual discs) or pycnidia (tiny asexual fruiting bodies) were seen in the available material. Rhizines and true hairs were not observed; attachment is by interwoven hyphae that originate near the lobe bases and mingle with sand grains or organic matter beneath the thallus.

=== Similar species ===
Within Antarctic Leptogium, the combination of a hairless, non-tomentose lower cortex and firm interwoven hyphae used for attachment separates L. tectum from the common L. puberulum (which has a tomentose lower cortex with simple hairs) and from the Antarctic species L. antarcticum (attached by hairs) and L. crispatellum (attached by short hapters).

== Habitat and distribution ==
Both known collections of L. tectum are from James Ross Island (Antarctic Peninsula region). The lichen was found inside small hollows formed by wind erosion in basaltic rock, growing on rock (saxicolous) with fine sediments at around 200 m elevation. The original account lists the species as known only from James Ross Island.
