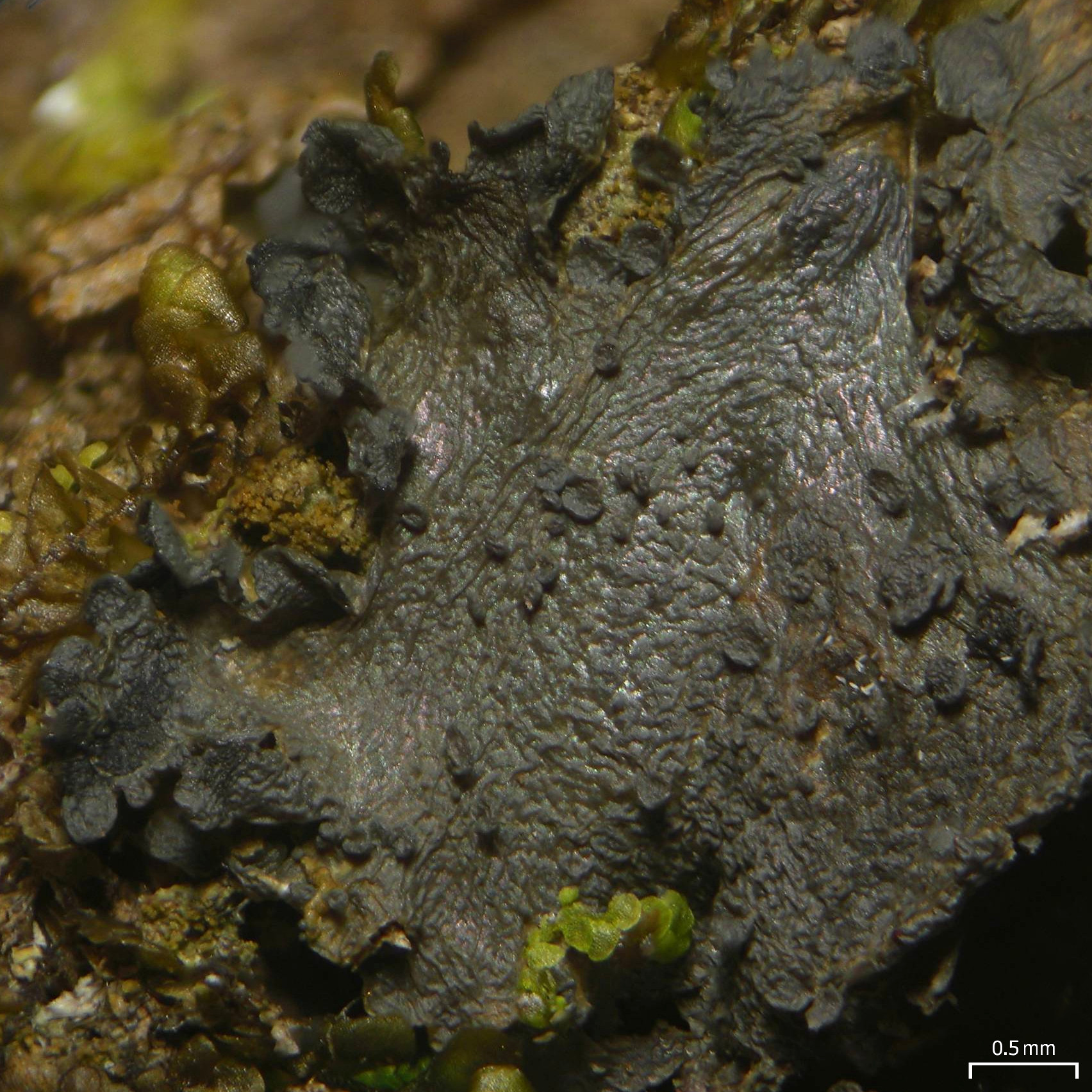

Scientific classification
- Kingdom: Fungi
- Division: Ascomycota
- Class: Lecanoromycetes
- Order: Peltigerales
- Family: Collemataceae
- Genus: Leptogium
- Species: L. austroamericanum

Binomial name
- Leptogium austroamericanum (Malme) C.W.Dodge (1933)

Synonyms
- Leptogium cyanescens var. austroamericanum Malme (1924); Leptogium caesium var. austroamericanum (Malme) Zahlbr. (1932)

= Leptogium austroamericanum =

Species of lichen-forming fungus

Leptogium austroamericanum is a species of corticolous (bark-dwelling) foliose lichen in the family Collemataceae. It is recognized by its lead-gray, wrinkled lobes bearing abundant cylindrical isidia (small finger-like outgrowths). The species is widely distributed in Brazil and the southeastern United States, where it grows on bark.

== Taxonomy ==
It was first formally described as a new species in 1926 by Gustaf Oskar Andersson Malme, who characterized it as a variety of Leptogium cyanescens. The type specimen was collected in Brazil. In 1932, Alexander Zahlbruckner reclassified it as a variety of Leptogium caesium. Carroll William Dodge promoted it to full species status a year later, giving it the binomial by which it is now known.

A 2019 review suggested that the species may be more narrowly circumscribed than earlier records imply, because morphologically similar specimens may have been identified as L. austroamericanum; the authors called for broader specimen review and molecular studies to clarify its limits.

== Description ==
The thallus is foliose, lead-gray to occasionally brownish, and typically 1–8 cm across. It is made up of numerous spreading to somewhat erect, rounded lobes that are 2–10 mm wide and paler on the underside. Both the upper and lower surfaces are distinctly and irregularly wrinkled. The lobe margins are usually entire, but often become isidiate. The isidia are abundant on the upper surface and along the margins, usually cylindrical to club-shaped, mostly simple but sometimes branched, and only occasionally scale-like (squamuliform). The lichen is attached to its substrate by scattered tufts of white hairs on the lower surface.

The lobes are typically about 100–250 (sometimes up to 300) μm thick and have a single-layered cortex, with the cells of the upper cortex tending to be slightly larger than those of the lower cortex. Apothecia (fruiting bodies) are rare; when present, they are sessile on the upper surface, 0.5–2.0 mm wide, with a light- to reddish-brown disc and a margin that may be smooth or isidiate. The asci are cylindric to club-shaped (clavate) and contain eight ascospores, which are ellipsoid, 15–27 × 7–9 μm, usually with 3–5 transverse septa and occasionally a single longitudinal septum.

== Habitat and distribution ==
Leptogium austroamericanum is widely distributed in Brazil, where it has been recorded from 15 states. It is abundant in the southeastern United States, where it occurs from the Gulf Coast northward to Maryland, Ohio, and Illinois, and westward to Missouri, eastern Oklahoma, and eastern Texas.

== See also ==
- List of lichens of Brazil
