= Leptogium antarcticum =

Scientific classification
- Kingdom: Fungi
- Division: Ascomycota
- Class: Lecanoromycetes
- Order: Peltigerales
- Family: Collemataceae
- Genus: Leptogium
- Species: L. antarcticum

Binomial name
- Leptogium antarcticum Scur, A.P.Lorenz & Kitaura (2018)
- Holotype: Keller Peninsula, King George Island, Antarctica

Species of lichen

Leptogium antarcticum is a small, dark jelly lichen in the family Collemataceae described in 2018 from the maritime Antarctic. The thallus (lichen body) forms tight, upward‑tilted lobes with a roughened, warted surface; the underside bears felted, beard‑like hairs that help it grip its substrate. When fertile it develops apothecia (disc‑like fruiting bodies) whose rims often show neat circular ridges. At present it is confirmed only from King George Island in the South Shetland Islands.

== Taxonomy ==
The species was described as new to science in 2018 by Mayara Camila Scur, Aline Pedroso Lorenz‑Lemke and Marcos Junji Kitaura in a revision of Antarctic Leptogium. The holotype was collected on mosses near the Comandante Ferraz Antarctic Station (Keller Peninsula, King George Island) at 24 m elevation, and is deposited in the herbarium of the Federal University of Mato Grosso do Sul (CGMS; N. M. Koch 5528). The epithet antarcticum refers plainly to the region in which it occurs.

The authors used an integrative approach: diagnostic morphology was combined with DNA sequence data from the fungal ITS and mitochondrial small‑subunit (mtSSU) markers to delimit species. In Bayesian and maximum‑likelihood analysis, L. antarcticum falls within Leptogium "clade B"; mtSSU data placed it near L. biloculare, L. crispatellum and L. rivulare. The analyses clearly separated L. antarcticum from the other Antarctic species treated in the study, including the superficially similar L. puberulum and L. marcellii.

== Description ==
The thallus is foliose (leaf‑like), about 2.5 cm across and 85–125 micrometres (μm) thick, appearing grey‑brown to black. Its narrow lobes (0.5–2.0 mm wide) are tightly crowded and tend to tilt upwards. The surface bears small tooth‑like and wart‑like outgrowths (denticulate and verruciform ornamentation), giving a granular feel at the margins; by contrast, it lacks isidia and true lobules, which are common in some related species. In practical terms, this means the species spreads and protects itself without the tiny, easily broken "cloning pegs" (isidia) seen in several other Leptogium.

Below, the lichen anchors itself by pale, beard‑like hairs—short, agglutinated bundles that create a felted (tomentose) lower surface. Internally, the medulla houses cyanobacteria (the photosynthetic partner), which explains the "jelly lichen" label: when wet, the gelatinous matrix swells and the thallus softens. The fungal hyphae in the medulla include short columns of threads set at about 65° to the surface; this columnar arrangement is a reliable microscopic marker for the species.

Fruiting bodies (apothecia), when present, are laminal, up to 3.0 mm in diameter, with a plane to shallowly cupped disc. The rim (thalline exciple) is usually smooth to finely toothed and is often marked by circular ridges, which is a recognisable field clue. Spores are spindle‑shaped, 20–25 × 10–15 μm, with several internal walls (submuriform to muriform). Tiny asexual structures (pycnidia) are rare; their conidia are about 2.5 × 1.0 μm.

== Habitat and distribution ==
As of its original publication, Leptogium antarcticum was confirmed only from King George Island (South Shetland Islands), where the type material was collected on mosses close to sea level. The species grows in the maritime Antarctic setting that favours many Leptogium: cool, wet, and often stony ground where meltwater and persistent moisture are common.

Field workers may encounter L. antarcticum mixed with other dark Leptogium. The combination of a crowded, upward‑facing lobed thallus, a distinctly hairy (beard‑like) lower surface, absence of isidia or true lobules, and apothecial rims with circular ridges separates it from co‑occurring species such as L. puberulum (typically with a velvety, less bearded underside and different cortex structure) and L. marcellii (which has marginal lobules and a different internal tissue pattern). L. antarcticum is one of seven Leptogium species recorded from the Antarctic.
