= Leptogium auriculatum =

Scientific classification
- Domain: Eukaryota
- Kingdom: Fungi
- Division: Ascomycota
- Class: Lecanoromycetes
- Order: Peltigerales
- Family: Collemataceae
- Genus: Leptogium
- Species: L. auriculatum

Binomial name
- Leptogium auriculatum P.M.Jørg. (2013)

Species of lichen

Leptogium auriculatum is a species of foliose lichen in the family Collemataceae. Found in Cape Horn, the southernmost point of South America, it was formally described as a new species in 2013 by Norwegian lichenologist Per Magnus Jørgensen. The type specimen was collected by William R. Buck east of Puerto Williams (Navarino Island), where it was found growing on wet rocks along a small stream in a disturbed Nothofagus forest. The leafy thallus of the lichen comprises orbicular, sometimes overlapping lobes, packed, intricately folded, irregular squamules that in some parts form dark greyish-blue lobes with undulating margins and a width of 0.5–1 cm (0.2–0.4 in). The upper thallus surface is more or less smooth, shiny, and dark greyish-brown, while the undersurface is paler and smooth. Leptogium auriculatum is only known to occur on rocks in the Cape Horn region in a couple of difficult-to-access locations.
