= Leptogium acadiense =

Scientific classification
- Domain: Eukaryota
- Kingdom: Fungi
- Division: Ascomycota
- Class: Lecanoromycetes
- Order: Peltigerales
- Family: Collemataceae
- Genus: Leptogium
- Species: L. acadiense

Binomial name
- Leptogium acadiense J.W.Hinds, F.L.Anderson & Lendemer (2016)

Species of lichen

Leptogium acadiense is a species of corticolous (bark-dwelling), foliose lichen in the family Collemataceae. Found in northeastern North America, it was formally described as a new species in 2016 by James Hinds, Frances Anderson, and James Lendemer. The species epithet refers to the Acadian region of eastern North America, where the lichen seems to be most common.

== Description ==
The thallus, or body, of Leptogium acadiense is foliose, meaning it is leaf-like and loosely attached, and ranges in size from 2 to 9 cm (0.8 to 3.5 in) in diameter. The lobes of the thallus are flat to concave, often with downturned margins, and resemble rose petals. They can be separated, contiguous, or overlapping, and are usually 3–12 mm (0.12–0.47 in) wide. The upper surface of the thallus is usually dull, with a color ranging from light bluish grey to dark brownish grey, often with olivaceous overtones, while the lower surface is medium grey and covered in short, white to tan tomentum.

The lichen's internal anatomy consists of loosely interwoven hyphae, with long chains of Nostoc between them. The upper and lower cortices, or outer layers of cells, are composed of rounded-rectangular cells, with the upper cortex soon interrupted by isidia formation and disintegrating. Apothecia, the reproductive structures of the lichen, are rare, usually stipitate, and range in size from 0.2 to 1.2 mm in diameter. They have a reddish-brown disk and a thalline margin, sometimes covered with variable amounts of granular isidia. No lichen products occur in this species and all chemical spot tests are negative.

== Habitat and distribution ==
Leptogium acadiense has a wide distribution across boreal and northern temperate regions in eastern North America. This species can be found in various habitats, from the tundra and taiga of northern Quebec to Atlantic Canada and northern Great Lakes region. The lichen prefers deciduous trees like Acer, Aesculus, Fraxinus, and Populus in mixed hardwood-conifer forests but it has also been observed on the bark of conifers like Thuja and on mossy logs or rocks. Some isolated populations have also been reported in middle to high elevation northern hardwood forests in the southern Appalachian Mountains, which are known to share similar lichen species as those found in boreal forests. Leptogium acadiense is considered to be native to eastern North America.
