= Leptogium cookii =

Scientific classification
- Kingdom: Fungi
- Division: Ascomycota
- Class: Lecanoromycetes
- Order: Peltigerales
- Family: Collemataceae
- Genus: Leptogium
- Species: L. cookii

Binomial name
- Leptogium cookii D.F.Stone & Lendemer (2016)
- Holotype site: Lake Clark National Park, Alaska

Species of lichen

Leptogium cookii is a species of corticolous (bark-dwelling), foliose lichen in the family Collemataceae. It is found in northwestern North America.

== Taxonomy ==
The lichen was formally described as a new species in 2016 by Daphne Stone and James Lendemer. The type specimen The species epithet honors Stanton Cook, professor emeritus of ecology, evolution, and geography at the University of Oregon.

== Description ==
This lichen species is characterized by a loose, adnate thallus with rounded, slightly concave lobes that are similar to rose petals. The lobes are either separated, contiguous, or overlapping and are typically 4–20 mm wide and 80–140 μm thick near the margins in wet conditions. The upper surface of the thallus is shiny to matt, starting blue-grey when young and transitioning to yellowish brown-gray to brownish gray with age. Occasionally, white hairs are present on sheltered or flat lobe surfaces, with cells up to 20 μm long.

Mature isidia are granular and cylindrical, about 10 μm in diameter, and darker and browner than the thallus surface. They develop in a saturninum-type pattern, meaning that they are often abundantly branched with age and covering patches of the thallus surface. The lower surface of the thallus is gray and densely covered with white to tan tomentum of even length, except for a small bare zone near the margins. Interspersed with small patches of longer, tangled white to tan hairs, the tomentum can be up to 500 μm long, in bundles up to 1.2 mm long.

In terms of internal anatomy, this lichen species has moderately densely interwoven hyphae making an angled pattern with few hyphae perpendicular to or parallel to the cortices. Long chains of Nostoc cyanobacteria can be found between hyphae. The upper and lower cortices consist of a single (rarely double) layer of more or less isodiametric cells, with the upper cortex cells measuring 5–10 μm wide by 4.0–7.5 μm high and the lower cortex cells measuring 7.5–12.5 μm wide by 6–10 μm high. The species has rare apothecia that are barely raised above the thallus when young and later becoming stipitate. The disc is reddish-brown and flat to slightly concave, with the apothecial margin thalline and 0.1 mm wide, the same color as with the thallus and becoming covered with isidia. The proper exciple is somewhat paraplectenchymatous at the margin and soon narrows to 25 μm wide and euthyparaplectenchymatous just beneath the surface. The thalline exciple is made of long, loosely arranged, more or less straight hyphal strands going in all directions with cyanobacterial chains woven between them. The species does not make any lichen products and all standard chemical spot tests are negative.

== Habitat and distribution ==
Leptogium cookii seems to be native to the coastal and inland regions of north-western North America. Its habitat is commonly associated with areas around riparian corridors or bodies of water, such as lakes, and can be found on the bark of hardwood trees like Fraxinus latifolia and Populus trichocarpa, as well as shrubs like Alnus and Salix. Additionally, there was one instance where the species was found directly growing on rock along a lake shore. Leptogium cookii is distributed in areas ranging from Washington and Idaho all the way north to Alaska.
