= Leptogium marcellii =

Scientific classification
- Kingdom: Fungi
- Division: Ascomycota
- Class: Lecanoromycetes
- Order: Peltigerales
- Family: Collemataceae
- Genus: Leptogium
- Species: L. marcellii

Binomial name
- Leptogium marcellii Kitaura, A.P.Lorenz & A.A.Spielm. (2018)
- Holotype: Dufayel Island, Antarctica

Species of lichen

Leptogium marcellii is a species of gelatinous lichen in the family Collemataceae. It was described in 2018 from the South Shetland Islands, Antarctica. It has overlapping lobes with small, flattened lobules (little flap-like outgrowths used for vegetative reproductio), a distinctly hairy underside, and a soft, gelatinous interior that swells when wet. Internally, its fungal threads (hyphae) are arranged in a loose, sponge-like network around the cyanobacteria rather than as neat vertical "columns", a key trait used to separate it from similar Antarctic species. Apothecia, when present, have rims that are ornamented when young and develop lobules with age.

== Taxonomy ==
The species was described as new in 2018 by Marcos Junji Kitaura, Aline Pedroso Lorenz‑Lemke, and Adriano Spielmann. The holotype was collected on mosses at Dufayel Island in Ezcurra Cove, King George Island, South Shetland Islands at 16 m elevation; the type is housed in the herbarium of the Federal University of Mato Grosso do Sul (CGMS; N. M. Koch 5552). The species name honours the Brazilian lichenologist Marcelo Pinto Marcelli.

The authors used an integrative approach (morphology plus DNA) and obtained ITS and mtSSU sequences for two specimens of L. marcellii. In the resulting phylogenetic trees, L. marcellii forms a well-supported lineage closely related to the Antarctic pair L. puberulum and L. tectum.

== Description ==
The thallus is foliose and typically around 4 cm across and 85–125 micrometres (μm) thick, dark brown to blackish in reflected light and brownish to greenish grey under a stereomicroscope. Lobes are up to about 4 mm wide; they overlap towards the margins and often turn slightly upwards. The lobe margins are smooth to lobulate and can look "crisped". Isidia (tiny peg-like clones) are absent, but flattened lobules are frequent on the margins and may also occur on the upper surface and along the rims of fruiting bodies.

Attachment is by both simple hairs and longer beard-like hairs on the lower side; rhizines and hapters are absent. The upper surface is smooth to slightly wrinkled; the lower cortex is tomentose (felted). In section, the medulla shows loosely packed hyphae in a sponge-like arrangement filled with cyanobacteria; unlike some relatives, there are no columnar (pillar-like) hyphae. This internal pattern is one of the most reliable diagnostic characters for the species.

Fruiting bodies (apothecia) were seen in additional material from Livingston Island. They are up to about 2.5 mm across, with a concave disc; the rim (thalline exciple) is initially ornamented with small wart-like structures and later bears lobules. Ascospores are spindle-shaped (fusiform), typically 20–25 × 5–7.5 μm; pycnidia occur on the thallus and produce slender conidia about 5 × 1.25 μm.

=== Similar species ===
Comparing with similar Antarctic taxa, L. marcellii differs from L. antarcticum in lacking columnar hyphae and in having overlapping lobes with lobules (rather than agglomerated lobes and prominent verruciform ornamentation). The apothecial margins of L. marcellii become lobulate with age, whereas those of L. antarcticum are smooth to denticulate and the amphithecium of L. antarcticum is ornamented.

== Habitat and distribution ==
Leptogium marcellii is confirmed from King George Island and Livingston Island in the South Shetland Islands. Collections were made on mossy soil and among small pebbles, and also on rock at coastal sites typical of the cool, wet maritime Antarctic. L. marcellii is one of seven Leptogium species recorded from the Antarctic.
