= Leptogium adnatum =

Scientific classification
- Domain: Eukaryota
- Kingdom: Fungi
- Division: Ascomycota
- Class: Lecanoromycetes
- Order: Peltigerales
- Family: Collemataceae
- Genus: Leptogium
- Species: L. adnatum

Binomial name
- Leptogium adnatum P.M.Jørg. (2013)

Species of lichen

Leptogium adnatum is a species of lichen in the family Collemataceae. Found in Cape Horn, the southernmost point of South America, it was formally described as a new species in 2013 by Norwegian lichenologist Per Magnus Jørgensen. The crust-like thallus of the lichen comprises densely packed, intricately folded, irregular squamules that in some parts form dark greyish-blue lobes that are firmly attached to their rock substrate. The species epithet adnatum refers to this tight attachment. Leptogium adnatum is only known to occur on coastal rocks in the Cape Horn region. The coastal locale is unusual for a species of Leptogium, but the author speculates that the high levels of rainfall that occur in the area dilutes the salt concentration sufficiently to make the climate more amenable to the growth of the lichen.
