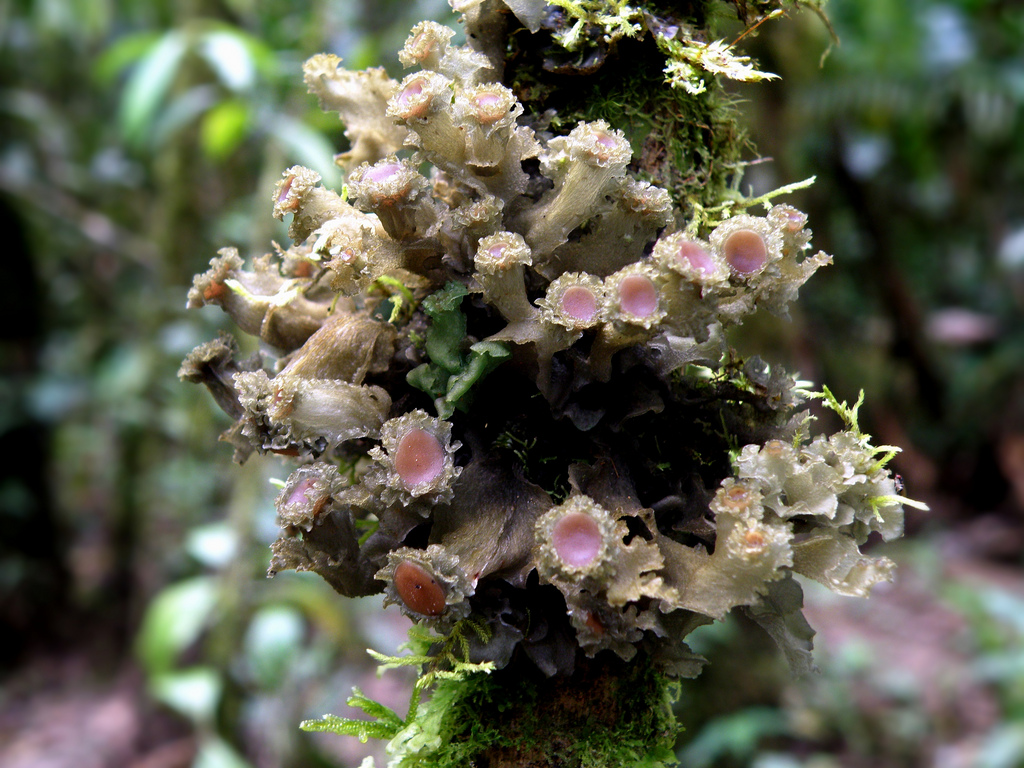
- Leptogium phyllocarpum

Scientific classification
- Kingdom: Fungi
- Division: Ascomycota
- Class: Lecanoromycetes
- Order: Peltigerales
- Family: Collemataceae
- Genus: Leptogium (Ach.) Gray (1821)

Type species
- Leptogium lacerum (Sw.) Gray (1821)

= Leptogium =

Genus of lichens

Leptogium is a genus of lichen-forming fungi in the family Collemataceae. It has about 110 species. Species formerly classified under Leptogium have since been divided among the genera Leptogium, Pseudoleptogium, and Scytinium. Leptogium lichens are predominantly found on tree bark or soil, often among mosses, and sometimes on rocks in moist environments.

== Taxonomy ==
In 2013, a proposal supported by molecular phylogenetics data was made to conserve the genus Leptogium with a conserved type, aiming to maintain the current broader classification including both small-squamulose and larger foliose species within Leptogium, while segregating the smaller squamulose species into Scytinium. This conservation was recommended by a vote of 14-0-1 to prevent the necessity of reclassifying about 100 species into new genera such as Malotium. The proposal was widely supported by the Nomenclature Committee for Fungi as it simplifies the taxonomy and maintains historical continuity for the genus Leptogium.

A broad molecular re-assessment of the jelly lichens (Collemataceae) showed that the long-used genera Collema and Leptogium were not each monophyletic. Using four DNA markers, the authors recovered ten well-supported lineages and, to align names with both molecules and morphology, they treated those lineages as genera. In that framework Leptogium is re-circumscribed to the clade formed by “B+C” in their trees, the group that includes Leptogium azureum—the conserved type species designated by Jørgensen and colleagues—so that the name Leptogium covers a coherent lineage. They also showed that a "true cortex" (a proper eucortex) has evolved several times, so cortex alone cannot define genera; instead, the revised classification combines molecular evidence with traits such as habitat, thallus size and anatomy, and spore type.

In this modern sense, Leptogium comprises the large, foliose, eucorticate jelly lichens, typically with lobes more than a few millimetres wide that can interconnect and swell conspicuously when wet, and it is mainly epiphytic (growing on bark) in wet tropical and humid temperate regions. The authors formalised this usage by listing Leptogium azureum as type, and by treating several historic names as synonyms, including Collema sect. Mallotium (≡ Mallotium), Leptogiopsis, and Colleptogium. They contrasted Leptogium with Scytinium, which contains smaller species (often with a pseudocortex rather than a true cortex), more frequently on soil, mosses, or rock, and centred in temperate regions.

== Description ==
Leptogium is characterized by its foliose, gelatinous thallus, which varies in colour from blue-grey to olive-brown or blackish. The upper and lower cortex of these lichens consists of a single layer of roughly equal-sized cells. The medulla, on the other hand, is made up of loosely intertwined hyphae intermingled with chains of photobiont cells. The upper surface of the thallus can range from smooth to wrinkled or ridged, often exhibiting a glossy appearance, while the lower surface may be smooth, web-like, or hairy, sometimes featuring small clusters of white rhizines.

Leptogium species often possess isidia and have Nostoc as their photobiont. The ascomata are apothecia, which can be sessile or shortly stalked and are predominantly laminal. The thalline margin may persist or become excluded, occasionally displaying a lobulate form. The true exciple is raised, cup-shaped, and mainly composed of periclinally arranged hyphae, with a colour that varies from colourless to reddish-brown. The disc of the lichen is either concave or flat.

The epithecium is colourless to reddish-brown and does not react with solutions of either potassium hydroxide or ammonia. The hymenium is colourless and turns blue when exposed to iodine. The hypothecium is shallow and either colourless or pale yellowish. The hamathecium consists of numerous, conglutinate paraphyses with slightly swollen apices. The asci are club-shaped (clavate) and contain four to eight spores, with the wall and apical dome turning blue in response to potassium hydroxide and iodine. Ascospores are ellipsoidal, ovoid, or fusiform, sometimes featuring an apiculate end, and are septate and colourless. Lichen substances have not been detected by thin-layer chromatography in Leptogium species.

== Species ==
As of April 2023, Species Fungorum (in the Catalogue of Life) accepts 86 species of Leptogium.

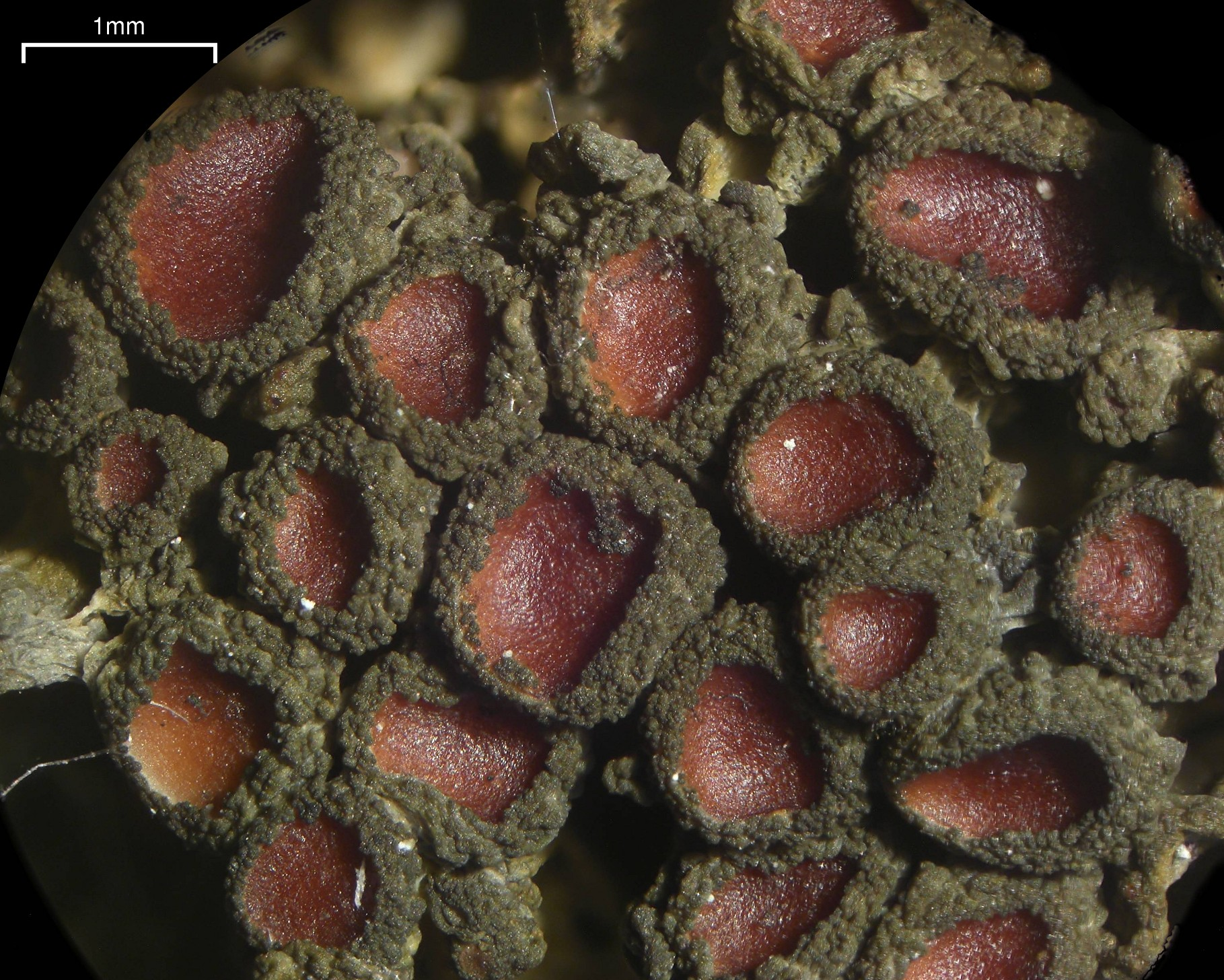
Leptogium chloromelum

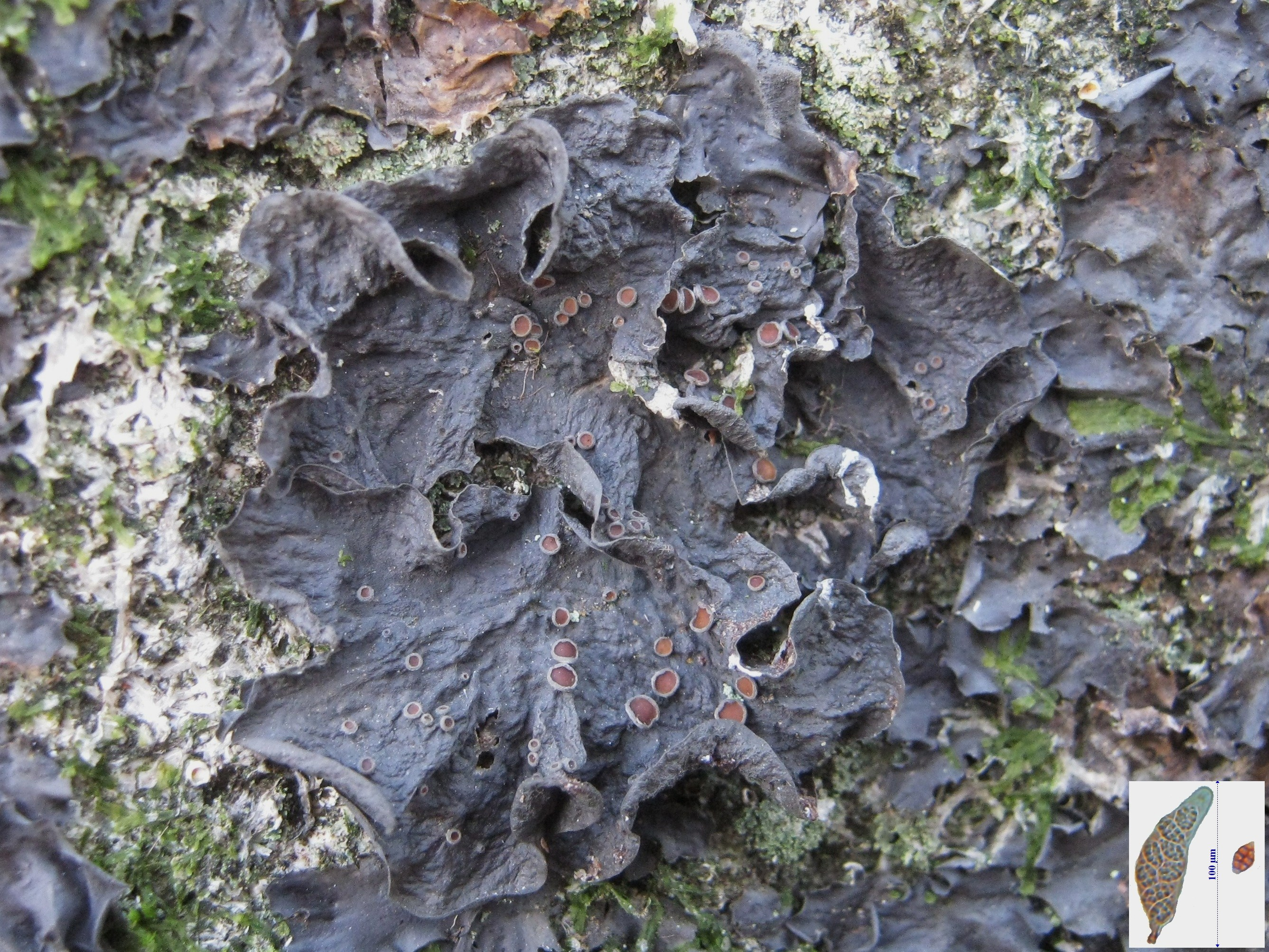
Leptogium cochleatum

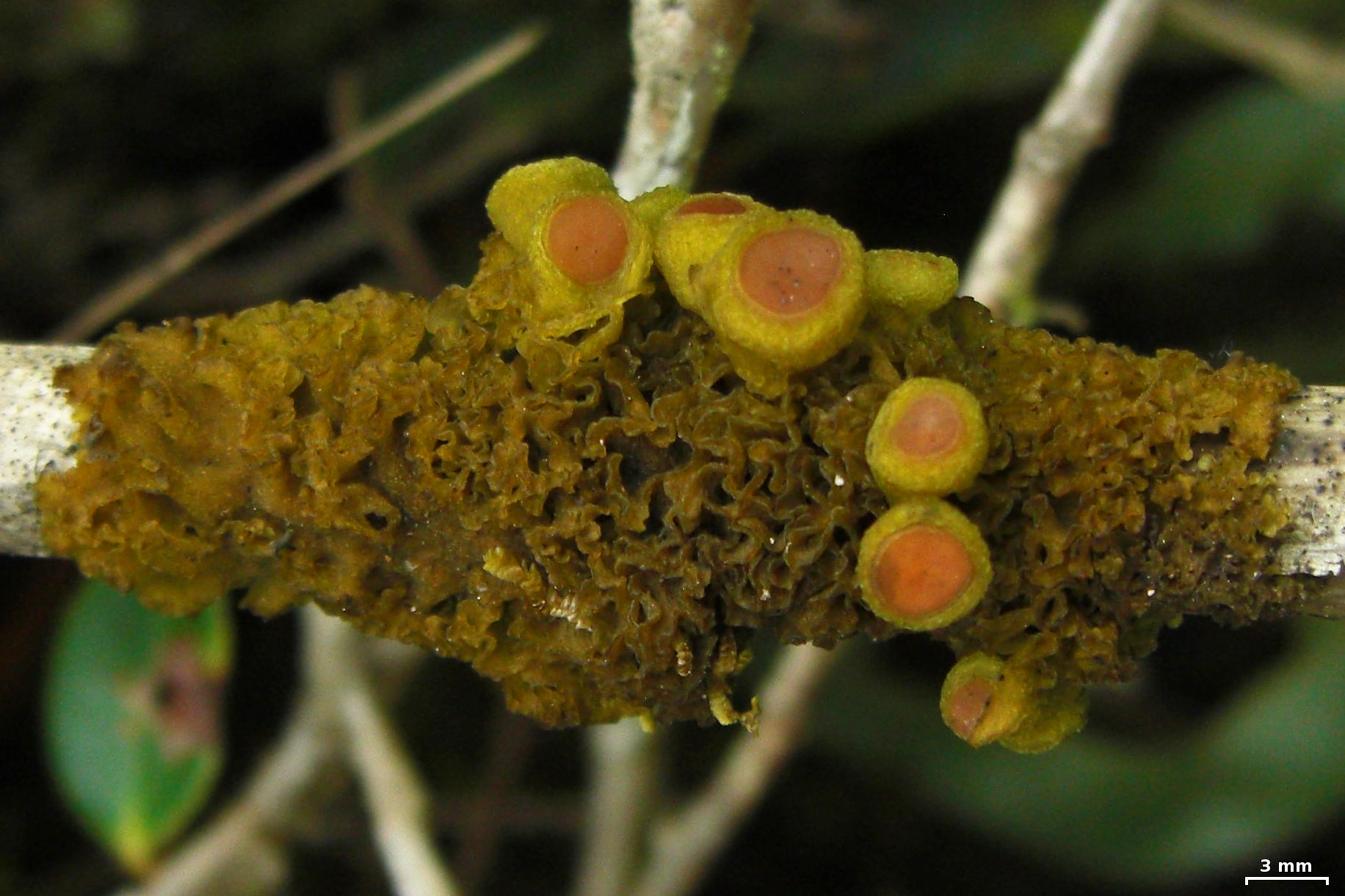
Leptogium javanicum

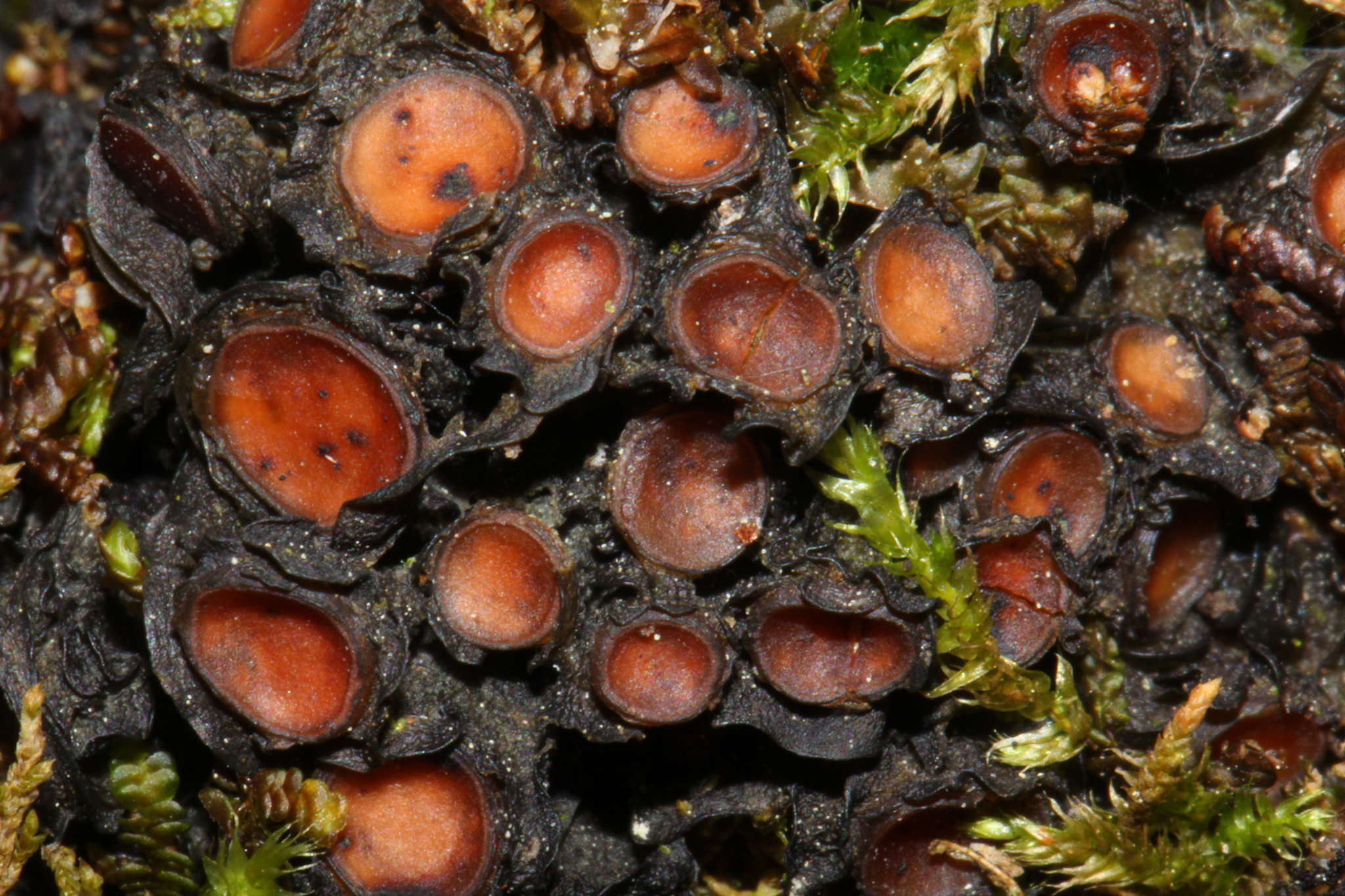
Leptogium phyllocarpum

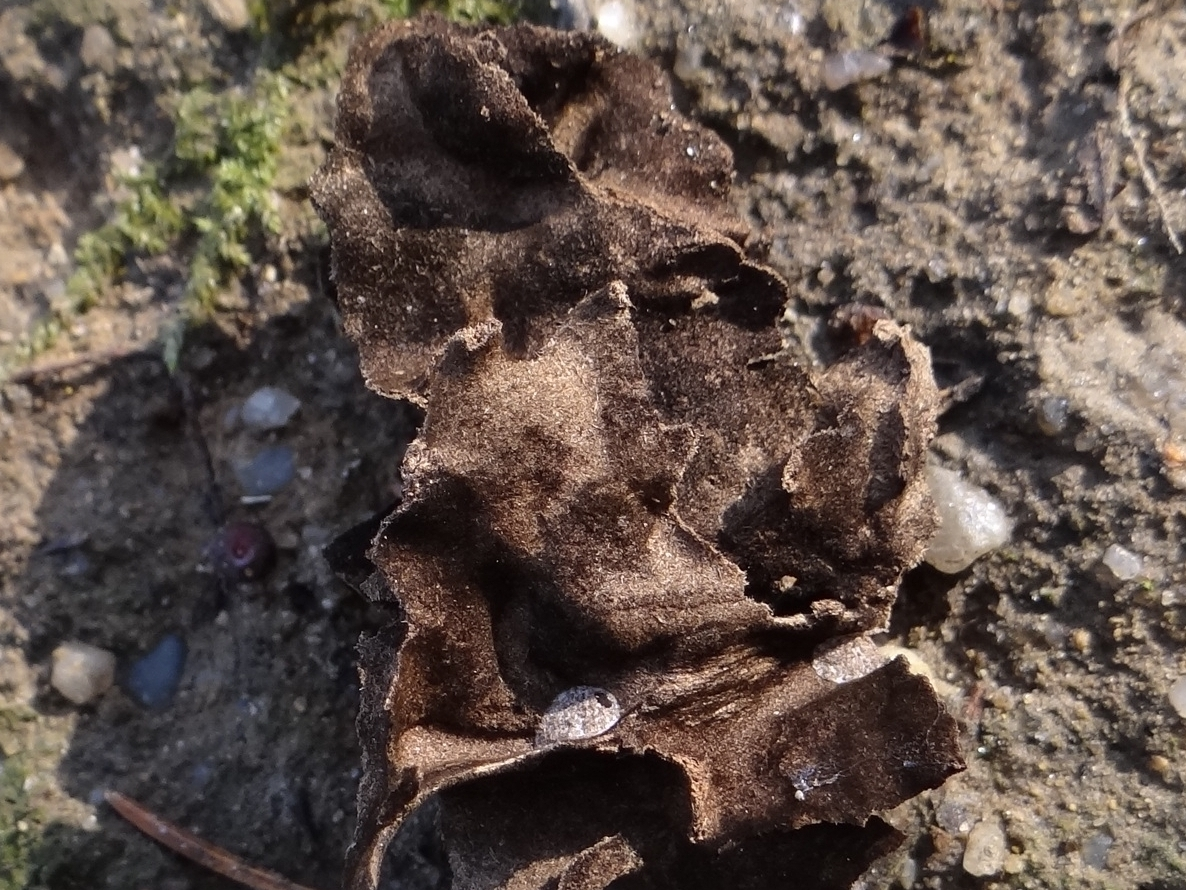
Leptogium saturninum

- Leptogium acadiense J.W.Hinds, F.L.Anderson & Lendemer (2016)
- Leptogium adnatum P.M.Jørg. (2013) – South America
- Leptogium andegavense Hy (1893)
- Leptogium antarcticum Scur, Lorenz-Lemke & Kitaura (2018) – Antarctica
- Leptogium asiaticum P.M.Jørg. (1973)
- Leptogium atlanticum Marcelli & Kitaura (2014)
- Leptogium auriculatum P.M.Jørg. (2013) – South America
- Leptogium austroamericanum (Malme) C.W.Dodge (1933)
- Leptogium azureum (Sw.) Mont. (1840)
- Leptogium biloculare F.Wilson (1891)
- Leptogium brebissonii Mont. (1840)
- Leptogium britannicum P.M.Jørg. & P.James (1983) – Europe
- Leptogium bullatulum Müll.Arg. (1891)
- Leptogium burgessii (L.) Mont. (1840)
- Leptogium chloromelum (Ach.) Nyl. (1857)
- Leptogium cochleatum (Dicks.) P.M.Jørg. & P.James (1983)
- Leptogium compactum D.F.Stone, F.L.Anderson & J.W.Hinds (2016)
- Leptogium cookii D.F.Stone & Lendemer (2016)
- Leptogium coralloideum (Meyen & Flot.) Vain. (1915)
- Leptogium corticola (Taylor) Tuck. (1849)
- Leptogium crispatellum Nyl. (1888)
- Leptogium cyanescens (Ach.) Körb. (1855)
- Leptogium davidii M.Lindstr. (2007)
- Leptogium enkarodes Verdon (1990) – Australia
- Leptogium epiphyllum M.Lindstr. (2007)
- Leptogium exaratum Kitaura & Lucheta (2019)
- Leptogium faciifictum Verdon (1990) – Australia
- Leptogium fallax Müll.Arg. (1882)
- Leptogium granulans Vain. (1921)
- Leptogium hibernicum M.E.Mitch. ex P.M.Jørg. (1973)
- Leptogium hildenbrandii (Garov.) Nyl. (1857)
- Leptogium hondae C.M.Bernardo, Kitaura & A.A.Spielm. (2019)
- Leptogium hypotrachynum Müll.Arg. (1881)
- Leptogium javanicum Mont. (1856)
- Leptogium joergensenii Marcelli & Kitaura (2014)
- Leptogium juressianum Tav. (1950)
- Leptogium kalbii Marcelli & I.P.R.Cunha (2007) – Brazil
- Leptogium kiyosumiense H.Harada (2017)
- Leptogium krogiae Bjelland, Frisch & Bendiksby (2017)
- Leptogium limbatum F.Wilson (1889)
- Leptogium longisporum Kitaura & Marcelli (2013)
- Leptogium loriforme P.M.Jørg. & Kashiw. (2008)
- Leptogium mantiqueirense Kitaura & Marcelli (2013)
- Leptogium marcellii Kitaura, Lorenz-Lemke & A.A.Spielm. (2018) – Antarctica
- Leptogium marginatum M.Lindstr. (2007)
- Leptogium marginellum (Sw.) Gray (1821)
- Leptogium mastocheilum (Vain.) Kitaura & Marcelli (2014)
- Leptogium menziesii (Sm.) Mont. (1852)
- Leptogium minutissimum (Flörke) Fr. (1845)
- Leptogium moluccanum (Pers.) Vain. 1890)
- Leptogium nylanderi Kitaura & Marcelli (2013)
- Leptogium oceanianum Kitaura & Marcelli (2014) – New Zealand
- Leptogium paramense (P.M.Jørg. & Palice) A.Košuth. & Wedin (2019)
- Leptogium patwardhanii A.Dube & Makhija (2010) – India
- Leptogium pecten F.Wilson (1891)
- Leptogium pellobatum Verdon (1990) – Australia
- Leptogium philorheuma F.Wilson (1893) – Australia
- Leptogium phyllocarpum (Pers.) Mont. (1848)
- Leptogium poliophaeum Verdon (1990) – Australia
- Leptogium propaguliferum Vain. (1921)
- Leptogium quercicola Otálora, Aragón, I.Martínez & M.C.Molina (2004)
- Leptogium quilombense C.M.Bernardo, Kitaura & A.A.Spielm. (2019)
- Leptogium rivulare (Ach.) Mont. (1846)
- Leptogium saturninum (Dicks.) Nyl. (1857)
- Leptogium saxatile Makryĭ (2012)
- Leptogium sphaerosporum P.M.Jørg. & Olley (2010) – Nepal
- Leptogium streimannii Verdon (1990) – Australia
- Leptogium subazureum A.Dube & Makhija (2010) – India
- Leptogium subjuressianum Marcelli & Kitaura (2012) – Brazil
- Leptogium sulcatum M.Lindstr. (2007)
- Leptogium taibaiense H.J.Liu & M.Q.Xi (2015) – China
- Leptogium tasmanicum F.Wilson (1893)
- Leptogium tectum Lorenz-Lemke, Kitaura & Scur (2018) – Antarctica
- Leptogium teretiusculum Wallr. ex Arnold (1892)
- Leptogium thailandicum A.H.Ekanayaka & K.D.Hyde (2018)
- Leptogium transversum M.Lindstr. (2007)
- Leptogium tremelloides (Ach.) Gray (1821)
- Leptogium verrucosum A.Dube & Makhija (2010) – India
- Leptogium victorianum F.Wilson (1891)
- Leptogium wangii H.J.Liu & M.Q.Xi (2015) – China
- Leptogium weii H.J.Liu & S.Guan (2012) – China
- Leptogium wilsonii Zahlbr. (1925)
