= Leptogium teretiusculum =

Scientific classification
- Kingdom: Fungi
- Division: Ascomycota
- Class: Lecanoromycetes
- Order: Peltigerales
- Family: Collemataceae
- Genus: Leptogium
- Species: L. teretiusculum

Binomial name
- Leptogium teretiusculum Wallr. ex Arnold (1892)

Species of lichen

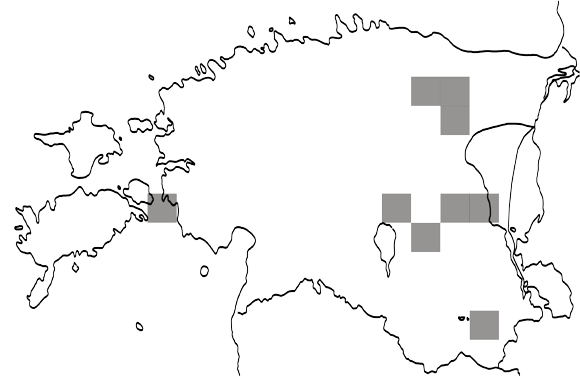
Leptogium teretiusculum. Distribution in Estonia, 2011.

Leptogium teretiusculum is a species of lichen belonging to the family Collemataceae.

It is native to Europe and Northern America.
