= Leptogium verrucosum =

Scientific classification
- Kingdom: Fungi
- Division: Ascomycota
- Class: Lecanoromycetes
- Order: Peltigerales
- Family: Collemataceae
- Genus: Leptogium
- Species: L. verrucosum

Binomial name
- Leptogium verrucosum A.Dube & Makhija (2010)

Species of lichen

Leptogium verrucosum is a rare species of foliose lichen in the family Collemataceae. Found in India, it was formally described as a new species in 2010 by Archana Dube and Urmila Vasudev Makhija. The type specimen was collected from the walls of the Purandar fort (Maharashtra) at an elevation of 1,350 m (4,430 ft). It has also been recorded growing on bark in moist shady locations. Characteristics of Leptogium patwardhanii include the numerous pycnidia that give the thallus a warty appearance, and the wrinkled upper and lower surfaces. Its ascospores are muriform (divided into internal chambers by a 1 or 2 vertical septa and 2 to 4 transverse septa), have acute ends, and measure 15–32 by 6–12 μm.
