= Leptogium subazureum =

Scientific classification
- Kingdom: Fungi
- Division: Ascomycota
- Class: Lecanoromycetes
- Order: Peltigerales
- Family: Collemataceae
- Genus: Leptogium
- Species: L. subazureum

Binomial name
- Leptogium subazureum A.Dube & Makhija (2010)

Species of lichen

Leptogium subazureum is a species of corticolous (bark-dwelling) and foliose lichen in the family Collemataceae. Found in India, it was formally described as a new species in 2010 by Archana Dube and Urmila Vasudev Makhija. The type specimen was collected along the road from Ajra to Amboli (Maharashtra) at an elevation of 900 m (3,000 ft). It is one of the most common lichens in the Western Ghats of Maharashtra. It grows along with mosses on the twigs and trunks of trees. The specific epithet subazureum alludes to its resemblance with Leptogium azureum, which differs in ascospore size.
