= Leptogium sphaerosporum =

Scientific classification
- Domain: Eukaryota
- Kingdom: Fungi
- Division: Ascomycota
- Class: Lecanoromycetes
- Order: Peltigerales
- Family: Collemataceae
- Genus: Leptogium
- Species: L. sphaerosporum

Binomial name
- Leptogium sphaerosporum P.M.Jørg. & Olley (2010)

Species of lichen

Leptogium sphaerosporum is a species of corticolous (bark-dwelling), foliose lichen in the family Collemataceae. Found in Nepal, it was formally described as a new species in 2010 by Per Magnus Jørgensen and Louise Olley. The type specimen was collected on the track from Thulo Syabru to Bamboo (Langtang) at an elevation of 1,970 m (6,460 ft). Here, in a shady and humid mixed broad-leaved forest, it was found growing on the bark of Alnus nepalensis. It has a bluish-grey, foliose thallus measuring up to 5 cm (2.0 in) wide comprising smooth lobes up to 0.5 cm (0.2 in) broad. The apothecia are up to 1.5 mm (0.06 in) in diameter with a flat brown disc and a thallus margin that is pale blue. The ascospores are spheroid, muriform (divided into chambers) with rounded tips and have dimensions of 19–27 by 14–19 μm. Leptogium sphaerosporum is similar to Leptogium pedicellatum, but the latter species is distinguished by its ellipsoid (not spheroid) ascospores that measure 25–30 by 10–15 μm.
