= Leptogium kalbii =

Scientific classification
- Domain: Eukaryota
- Kingdom: Fungi
- Division: Ascomycota
- Class: Lecanoromycetes
- Order: Peltigerales
- Family: Collemataceae
- Genus: Leptogium
- Species: L. kalbii

Binomial name
- Leptogium kalbii Marcelli & I.P.R.Cunha (2007)

Species of lichen

Leptogium kalbii is a species of lichen in the family Collemataceae. It is found in Brazil, both in São Paulo State and in some Islands of Brazil.

== Taxonomy ==
Leptogium kalbii was formally described as a new species in 2007 by Brazilian lichenologists Marcelo Marcelli and Iane P.R. Cunha. The type specimen was collected on a tree trunk in a shady restinga forest beside the Guaraú River in São Paulo. The specific epithet honours German lichenologist Klaus Kalb, who, according to the authors, "has worked on Brazilian lichens for over 30 years, producing important contributions in tropical lichenology, and who sowed the seeds of modern lichenology in São Paulo State".

== Description ==
The lichen has a wrinkled thallus, greenish to brownish gray in colour, measuring 3–9.5 cm (1.2–3.7 in) wide, comprising flat, overlapping lobes that are 2–5.5 mm wide. It has roughly spherical laminal structures the authors call "granules" that measure 0.1–0.25 mm in diameter, and originate from the edges of the wrinkles. These granules, which are the same colour as the thallus, may be absent in some thalli, or densely crowded in others. Apothecia are mostly located on the margins on the thallus; they are up to 1.2 mm in diameter.

The ascospores are ellipsoid with sharp tips, measuring 26.5–32.5 μm; they have 3 to 5 transverse septa and 1 or 2 longitudinal septa. The cyanobacterial partner of Leptogium kalbii is Nostoc; their cells measure 5.0–6.5 by 5.0–6.5 μm.
