= Leptogium compactum =

Conservation status
- Apparently Secure (NatureServe)

Scientific classification
- Kingdom: Fungi
- Division: Ascomycota
- Class: Lecanoromycetes
- Order: Peltigerales
- Family: Collemataceae
- Genus: Leptogium
- Species: L. compactum

Binomial name
- Leptogium compactum D.F.Stone, F.L.Anderson & J.W.Hinds (2016)

Species of lichen

Leptogium compactum is a species of corticolous (bark-dwelling), foliose lichen in the family Collemataceae. Found in northwestern North America, it was formally described as a new species in 2016 by Daphne Stone, Frances Anderson, and James Hinds. It is distinguished from related Leptogium species by the tightly packed hyphae in the medulla; this characteristic internal anatomy is alluded to in the species epithet compactum.

== Description ==
This lichen has a leafy thallus that is loosely attached and measures 3–6 cm in diameter. The lobes are rounded, slightly concave, and have an involute margin, resembling rose petals. They are 4–20 mm wide, separated or overlapping, and about 70–100 μm thick near the margins in a wet mount. The upper surface is usually blue-grey, dull and smooth, although young lobes may be shiny. The texture becomes rough and brown as isidia emerge on the surface. The margins have an unorganized, low-wrinkled texture, similar to older parts of the lobes. Sometimes, the cortex pulls apart, leaving shiny, light tan cracks into the medulla. There may also be white hairs of varying lengths (60–135 μm) present on very sheltered surfaces.

The internal anatomy of this lichen shows a tightly packed, interwoven thallus, with long, undulating hyphae that run more or less parallel to cortices. The hyphae are even in diameter and not constricted at cell junctions. Some columnar hyphae made of several short cells are pinched at the joint with the next cell. The Nostoc photobiont appears as single cells or short chains between the compactly packed hyphae. The upper and lower cortices consist of a single (rarely double) layer of almost isodiametric cells. The upper cortex cells are 5–11 μm wide by 5.5–10.0 (sometimes up to 17.5) μm high, while the lower cortex cells are typically 7.5–10.0 μm wide by 6–11 μm high.

This lichen has rare apothecia that are 1–3 mm in diameter and stipitate. The disc is reddish-brown and flat, with the outer part of the apothecial margin concolorous with the thallus and becoming covered with isidia (0.1–0.2 mm wide). The proper exciple is visible as a narrow, yellowish-tan line around the inside edge and is euparaplectenchymatous. It is 55 μm wide at the margin, narrowing to 25 μm at the base of the hymenium, with cells up to 15 μm tall, grading into subparaplectenchymatous beneath the hymenium. The thalline exciple has a layer of cyanobacteria 75 μm thick at the upper surface that continues under the apothecium and extends down to a 3–5-cell thick layer of hyaline, rectangular cells above the lower cortex (of the amphithecium). The cyanobacterial layer is even on the upper side and undulating on the lower side. The subhymenium is pale yellowish-tan, and the hymenium is 110–137 μm tall, hyaline, with a pinkish-brown epihymenium. The paraphyses are unbranched and approximately 2 μm wide. The asci are clavate, approximately 50–75 μm tall, with a thick-walled tip and are 15 μm wide near the tip. Two to seven ascospores are discernible per ascus, and they are hyaline, ellipsoid, and have 0–1 septa. They measure 22.5–27.5 by 12.5–13.0 μm.

== Habitat and distribution ==
This particular species is seemingly restricted to the northwestern region of North America, with a broad range spanning from the coastal areas to the inland sites that extend from western Oregon in the south, up to British Columbia and Alaska in the north. It is mostly found in wet environments that are closely linked to riverine zones or aquatic bodies like lakes, and can be seen growing on rocks as well as the bark of hardwood trees such as Populus trichocarpa and Alnus viridis, as well as coniferous trees like Abies.
