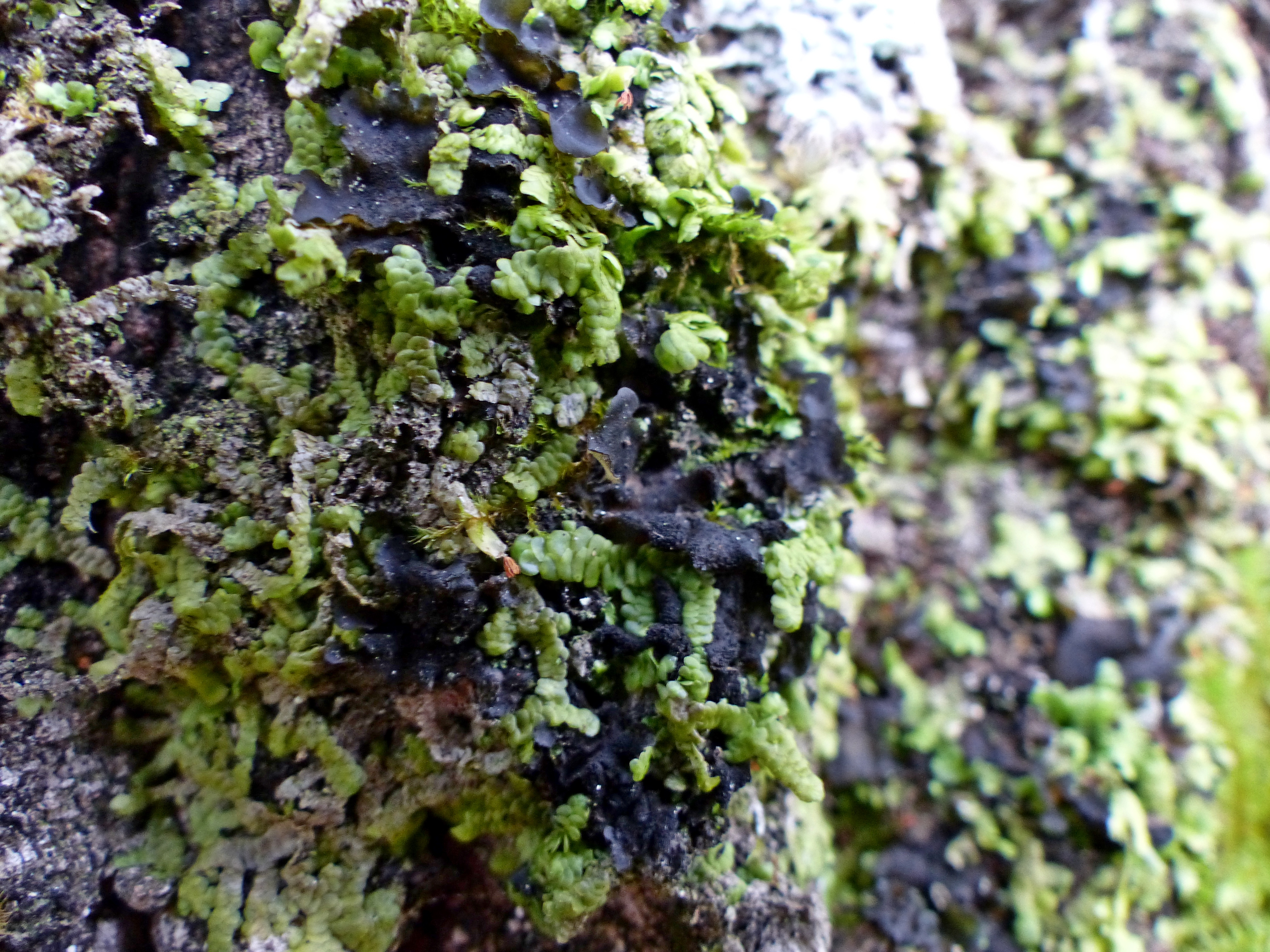

Scientific classification
- Kingdom: Fungi
- Division: Ascomycota
- Class: Lecanoromycetes
- Order: Peltigerales
- Family: Collemataceae
- Genus: Leptogium
- Species: L. saturninum

Binomial name
- Leptogium saturninum (Dicks.) Nyl. (1857)

Synonyms
- Lichen saturninus Dicks. (1790) (basionym)

= Leptogium saturninum =

Species of lichen-forming fungus

Leptogium saturninum is a species of lichen-forming fungus belonging to the family Collemataceae.

It has cosmopolitan distribution. In Nepal, Leptogium saturninum has been reported from 1,500 to 2,100 m elevation in a compilation of published records.
