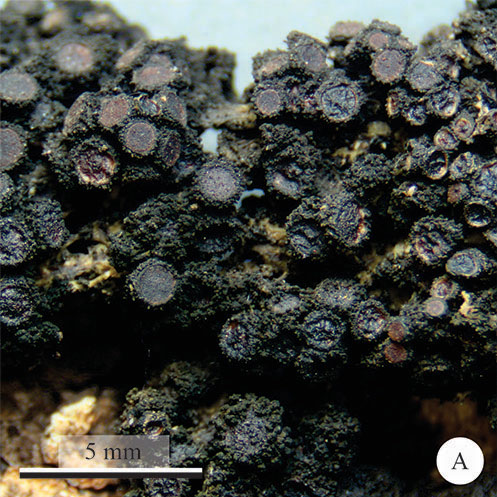
- Hondaria leptospora; image shows ornamented apothecia with granular isidia on the margin. Scale bar is 5 mm

Scientific classification
- Domain: Eukaryota
- Kingdom: Fungi
- Division: Ascomycota
- Class: Lecanoromycetes
- Order: Peltigerales
- Family: Collemataceae
- Genus: Hondaria; Kitaura & A.P.Lorenz (2020)
- Species: H. leptospora

Binomial name
- Hondaria leptospora (Malme) Kitaura, M.C.Scur & A.P.Lorenz (2020)

Synonyms
- Arctomia leptospora (Malme) Otálora & Wedin (2013); Collema leptosporum Malme (1924)

= Hondaria =

Single-species lichen genus

Hondaria is a single-species fungal genus in the family Collemataceae. It contains the species Hondaria leptospora, a corticolous (bark-dwelling), foliose lichen. This lichen was previously classified under the genus Collema, and later Arctomia, but molecular research combined with morphological analysis indicates that it forms a distinct genus. Named in honour of Dr. Neli Kika Honda, a researcher of lichen chemistry, Hondaria leptospora is notable for its long, thin, transversely-septate ascospores, the longest within its family. The species is found predominantly in the west-central regions of Brazil near the borders with Bolivia and Paraguay.

== Taxonomy ==
The species now known as Hondaria leptospora was originally discovered by the Swedish botanist Gustaf Oskar Andersson Malme in the late 19th century, during the First Regnellian Expedition, and published as a new species in 1924. At the time, the lichen was classified as Collema leptosporum and was identified as part of the Collema fasciculare group within the family Collemataceae. This group, including Collema fasciculare, C. papuanorum, and C. uviforme, was later reassigned to the genus Arctomia in the family Arctomiaceae. This reclassification was based on the molecular analysis of C. fasciculare, although no molecular data were obtained for the other species. However, Hondaria leptospora was found to be genetically distinct from Arctomia through the study of DNA sequences, resulting in the creation of the new genus Hondaria. The genus is named in tribute to Dr. Neli Kika Honda, who has extensively researched the chemistry of lichens in the region since 1992.

== Description ==
Hondaria leptospora is a foliose lichen, medium-sized and homoiomerous, with a darkly coloured thallus that can appear black to dark olive brown when dry. The lichen's lobes are irregularly outlined and branched, and bear granular isidia, tiny outgrowths on the lichen surface. Notable features of the lichen include its ascospores, which are long and thin (typically 120–175 by 2–4 μm) and transversely septate, a characteristic that helps distinguish it from other similar species. The apothecia, or spore-producing structures, are laminal and pedicellate, adorned with isidia, and display a reddish-brown disc. These characteristics, coupled with genetic data, help separate Hondaria leptospora from the other members of the former C. fasciculare group.

== Similar species ==
In terms of appearance and morphology, Hondaria leptospora shares notable similarities with other species, such as Arctomia papuanorum and A. uviforme. Like H. leptospora, both these species boast a thick paraplectenchymatous proper exciple, setting them apart from Gabura fasciculare. Their phylogenetic relation to Hondaria is yet to be definitively determined due to the absence of DNA sequence data for these species.

Hondaria leptospora distinguishes itself by having the longest and thinnest ascospores within the previously identified C. fasciculare group, according to prior research by Degelius (1974) and Otálora and Wedin (2013).

== Habitat and distribution ==
Hondaria leptospora is found predominantly in the west-central region of Brazil, particularly near the borders with Bolivia and Paraguay. The region is noted for its diverse vegetation formations, including the Pantanal wetlands, the Brazilian savanna known as the Cerrado, and the Chaco. The lichen grows on the bark of trees in these areas.
