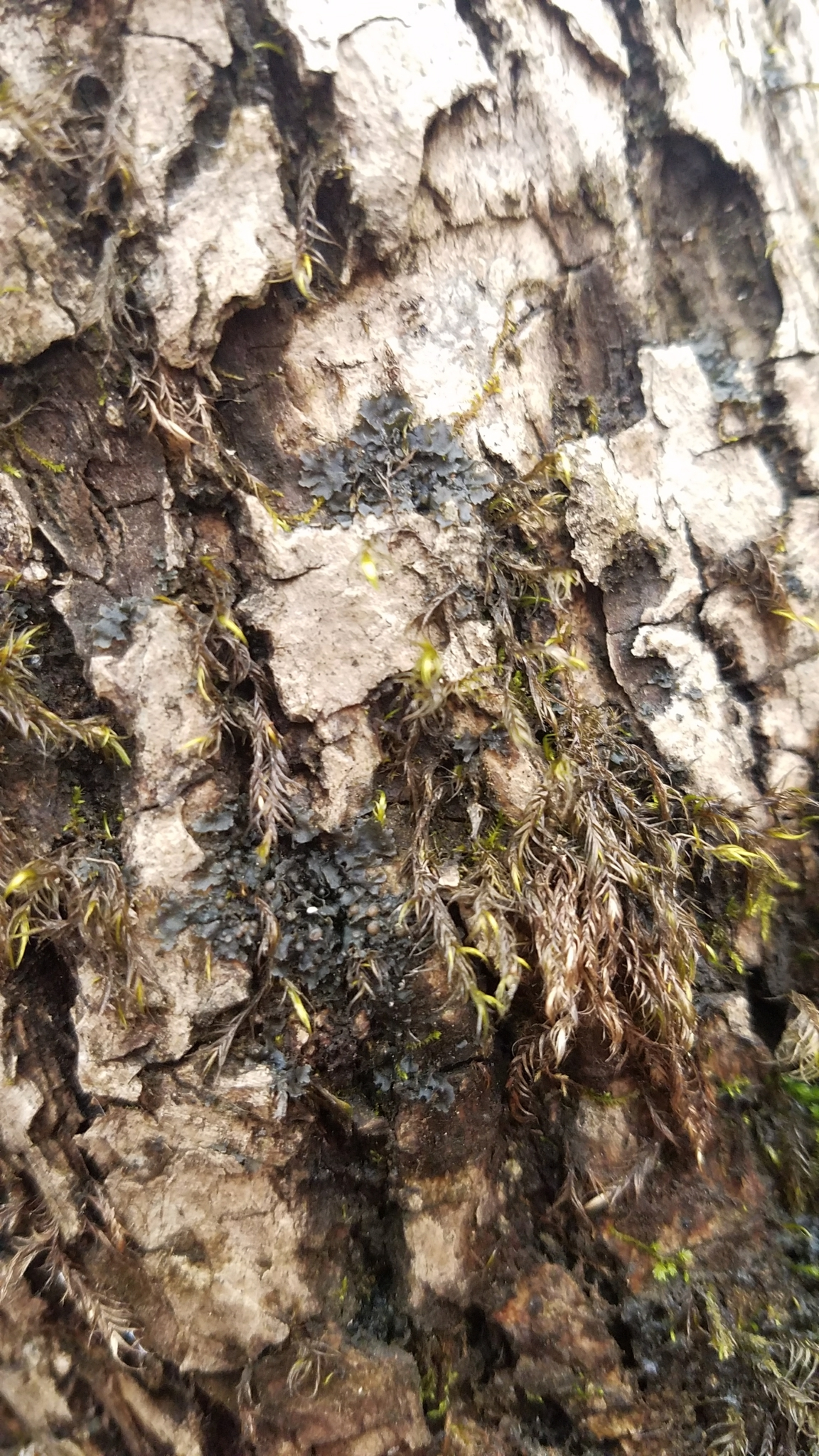

Conservation status
- Near Threatened (IUCN 3.1)

- Apparently Secure (NatureServe)

Scientific classification
- Kingdom: Fungi
- Division: Ascomycota
- Class: Lecanoromycetes
- Order: Peltigerales
- Family: Collemataceae
- Genus: Leptogium
- Species: L. rivulare

Binomial name
- Leptogium rivulare (Ach.) Mont.

= Leptogium rivulare =

Species of fungus

Leptogium rivulare, also called the flooded jellyskin lichen, is a species of lichen belonging to the family Collemataceae.

It is native to Europe and Northern America.
