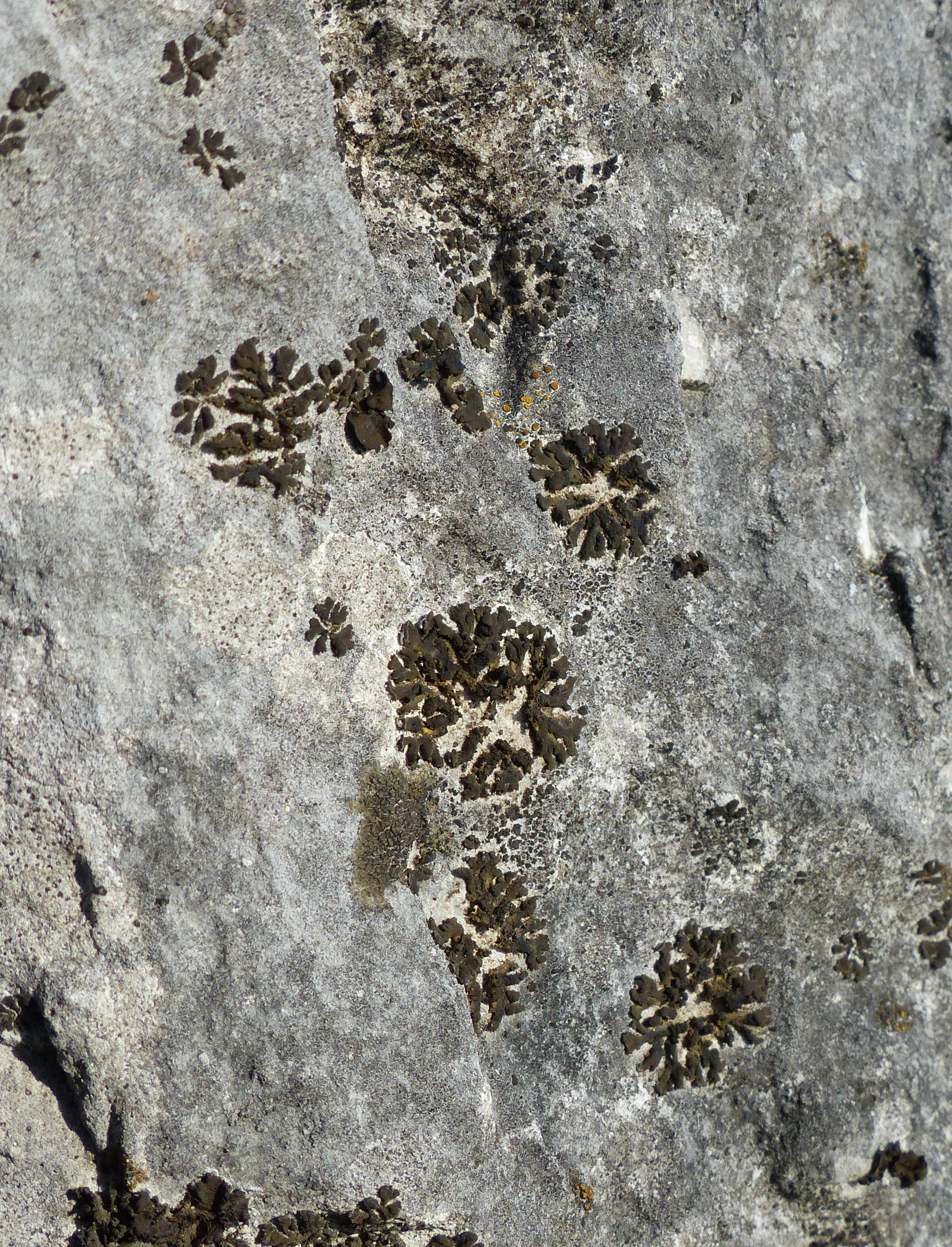
- Callome multipartita on a rock in Italy

Scientific classification
- Domain: Eukaryota
- Kingdom: Fungi
- Division: Ascomycota
- Class: Lecanoromycetes
- Order: Peltigerales
- Family: Collemataceae
- Genus: Callome; Otálora & Wedin (2013)
- Species: C. multipartita

Binomial name
- Callome multipartita (Sm.) Otálora, P.M.Jørg. & Wedin (2013)

Synonyms
- List: Collema multipartitum Sm. (1814); Synechoblastus multipartitus (Sm.) Körb. (1855); Lathagrium multipartitum (Sm.) Kremp. (1861); Gabura multipartita (Sm.) Kuntze (1891); Lathagrium muelleri Arnold (1858); Synechoblastus muelleri Hepp ex Anzi (1860); Physma muelleri Hepp ex Müll.Arg. (1862); Lathagrium muelleri (Hepp ex Müll.Arg.) Arnold (1867); Collema muelleri (Hepp ex Müll.Arg.) Stizenb. (1882); Lempholemma muelleri (Hepp ex Müll.Arg.) Zahlbr. (1924)

= Callome =

Single-species lichen genus

Callome is a fungal genus in the family Collemataceae. It consists of the single species Callome multipartita, a saxicolous (rock-dwelling), crustose lichen found in Northern Africa, Europe, and North America.

== Taxonomy ==
This species was originally described by James Edward Smith in 1814 as a member of the genus Collema. It went through several genus changes in its taxonomic history, until Mónica Andrea García Otálora and Mats Wedin circumscribed Callome in 2013 to contain it. The genus name is an anagram of the original genus name Collema. The genus is equivalent to the Collema multipartitum group described by Gunnar Degelius in his 1954 work on European Collema species.

== Description ==
The lichen genus Callome is characterised by its small, foliose (leaf-like) thallus, typically ranging from 1 to 3 cm in diameter, though it can sometimes reach up to 5 cm. The thallus is rounded or irregular in shape, with deep lobes and extensive branching. It is loosely attached to its substrate and partly ascends, giving it a delicate and fragile appearance. When wet, the thallus does not swell, and the central part may degrade over time, leading to very irregular shapes. The lobes are narrow, about 1 to 1.5 mm wide, and are often fan-shaped, twisted, and nodular. These lobes are convex and can become almost cylindrical, with repeated branching.

Unlike many other lichens, Callome lacks a cortex (a protective outer layer), and its thallus is composed of a uniform layer of hyphal cells mixed with chains of photobiont cells, which are responsible for photosynthesis. The upper surface is a dark olive-green to brown-black colour and has a matt finish. It is smooth or may have fine, longitudinal striations but does not have a fuzzy or hairy texture. When moist, the surface can appear slightly swollen and semi-transparent.

Reproductive structures called conidiomata are commonly found within the thallus and are typically immersed in the surface. The conidia (asexual spores) produced are small, measuring 5 to 7 μm in length and 1 to 1.5 μm in width, and are rod-shaped, slightly swollen at the tip, and colourless.

The lichen also produces apothecia, which are the sexual reproductive structures. These are scattered across the surface and are typically 1 to 2 mm in diameter. The apothecia have a dark brown disc that is flat to slightly convex, surrounded by a thick, often crenulated or lobed margin. The asci (spore-producing sacs within the apothecia) measure 70 to 100 μm in length and 15 to 20 μm in width, each containing eight spores. The ascospores are ellipsoidal to spindle-shaped, sometimes curved, and measure 25 to 45 μm in length and 4.5 to 6.5 μm in width. They are divided into 3 to 4 segments (septate) and are colourless.

Species of Lathagrium are somewhat similar in appearance, but their lobes are concave rather than convex and they have differently shaped ascospores.

== Species interactions ==
Endococcus pseudocarpus is a lichenicolous fungus that is known to use Calloma as a host lichen.

== Habitat and distribution ==
Callome multipartita is known to occur in Northern Africa, Europe, and North America, where it grows on rocks.
