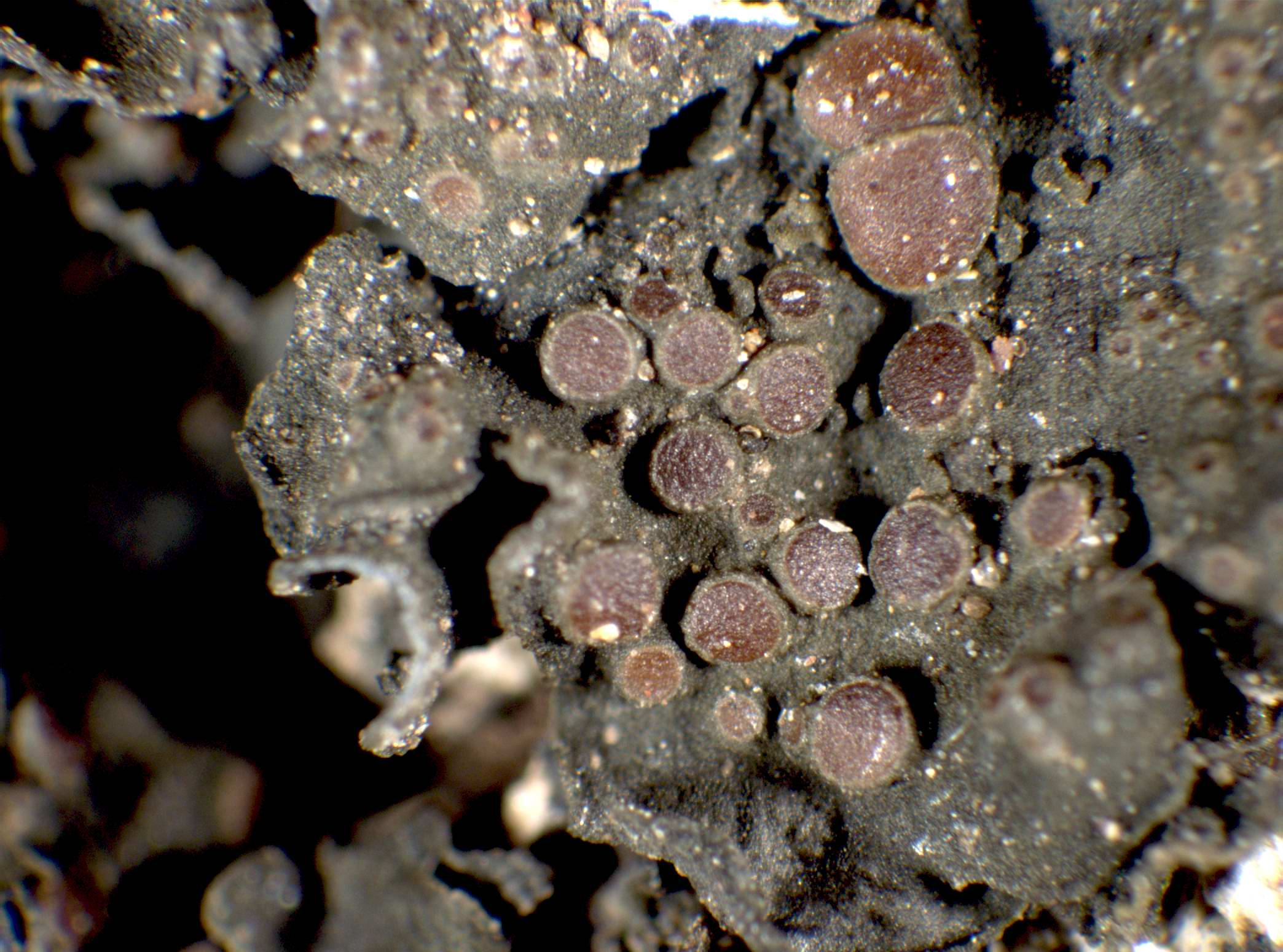
- Paracollema italicum

Scientific classification
- Domain: Eukaryota
- Kingdom: Fungi
- Division: Ascomycota
- Class: Lecanoromycetes
- Order: Peltigerales
- Family: Collemataceae
- Genus: Paracollema; Otálora & Wedin (2013)

Type species
- Paracollema italicum (B.de Lesd.) Otálora, P.M.Jørg. & Wedin (2013)

Species
- P. almbornii P. italicum

= Paracollema =

Genus of lichens

Paracollema is a small genus of lichen-forming fungi in the family Collemataceae. It comprises two species of jelly lichens, characterised by their small size, gelatinous nature when wet, and distinctive reproductive structures. The genus was proposed in 2013 and later validated in 2017. Paracollema lichens form small, leafy thalli up to 1 cm in diameter, with dark olive green to brownish colouration. They are distinguished from related genera by their very small asci and spores. Both known species are primarily epiphytic and have a limited distribution in southern Europe and northern Africa, typically found in Mediterranean or semi-arid climates.

== Taxonomy ==
The genus Paracollema was circumscribed by Mónica Otálora and Mats Wedin in 2013, but this initial publication was not considered valid due to a misprint of the required identifier number. The genus was later validated by Wedin, Otálora and Per Magnus Jørgensen in 2017, officially establishing Paracollema as a recognised taxonomic entity.

Paracollema is placed within the family Collemataceae, order Peltigerales, class Lecanoromycetes. It is distinguished from other genera in the Collemataceae by its very small asci and spores. The genus corresponds to the Collema Italicum-group defined by Gunnar Degelius in 1974.

Phylogenetic studies have shown that Paracollema forms a distinct clade within the Collemataceae, separate from Collema and other related genera. This molecular evidence, combined with the distinctive morphological features, supported the recognition of Paracollema as a separate genus.

== Description ==
Paracollema comprises small, leafy lichens known as jelly lichens due to their gelatinous nature when wet. These lichens form small thalli, reaching up to 1 cm in diameter, which are dark olive green to brownish in colour. The thallus is homoiomerous, meaning that the fungal hyphae and photobiont cells are evenly distributed throughout, without distinct layers.

The lobes of Paracollema lichens are small, entire, and rounded, typically measuring up to 3 mm in width. Their surface can be smooth or slightly wrinkled. Unlike some related genera, Paracollema lacks a cortex, which is a protective outer layer of tightly packed fungal cells. Some species may develop isidia, which are small, cylindrical outgrowths that serve for vegetative reproduction.

Apothecia (fruiting bodies) are often present and numerous in Paracollema species. These disc-shaped structures are sessile (attached directly to the thallus without a stalk) and appear on the upper surface of the lobes. The discs are flat to slightly convex and dark red in colour. The apothecia have a thin, entire thalline margin (an extension of the thallus tissue) and a proper exciple (an inner layer of fungal tissue) that is euthyplectenchymatous, composed of interwoven hyphae.

A distinctive feature of Paracollema is its remarkably small reproductive structures. The asci, sac-like structures that produce spores, are very small, measuring only 30–45 μm long and 8–9 μm wide. Each ascus typically contains eight spores. The spores themselves are also diminutive, ranging from 10 to 13 μm in length and 3–4.5 μm in width. They are narrowly ellipsoid or somewhat oblong in shape and have two cells separated by a single septum. Paracollema lichens also produce pycnidia, which are small, flask-shaped structures that produce asexual spores called conidia. These are often present on the thallus surface.

== Habitat and distribution ==
Paracollema comprises two known species, both of which have a relatively limited distribution in southern Europe and northern Africa. These lichens are primarily epiphytic, meaning they grow on the bark of trees.

Paracollema italicum, the type species of the genus, was originally described from Italy, as its name suggests. It has since been reported from other Mediterranean countries, including Spain and Morocco. This species tends to favour areas with a Mediterranean climate, characterised by warm, dry summers and mild, wet winters.

Paracollema almbornii has a similarly restricted distribution. It was first described from Morocco and has subsequently been found in other parts of North Africa and southern Spain. Like its congener, it is typically found in regions with a Mediterranean or semi-arid climate.

Both species show a preference for bark substrates, particularly those of deciduous trees. They are often found in open woodland habitats or on isolated trees in agricultural landscapes where they receive adequate light exposure. The restricted distribution of Paracollema species suggests they may have specific environmental requirements or limited dispersal capabilities.
