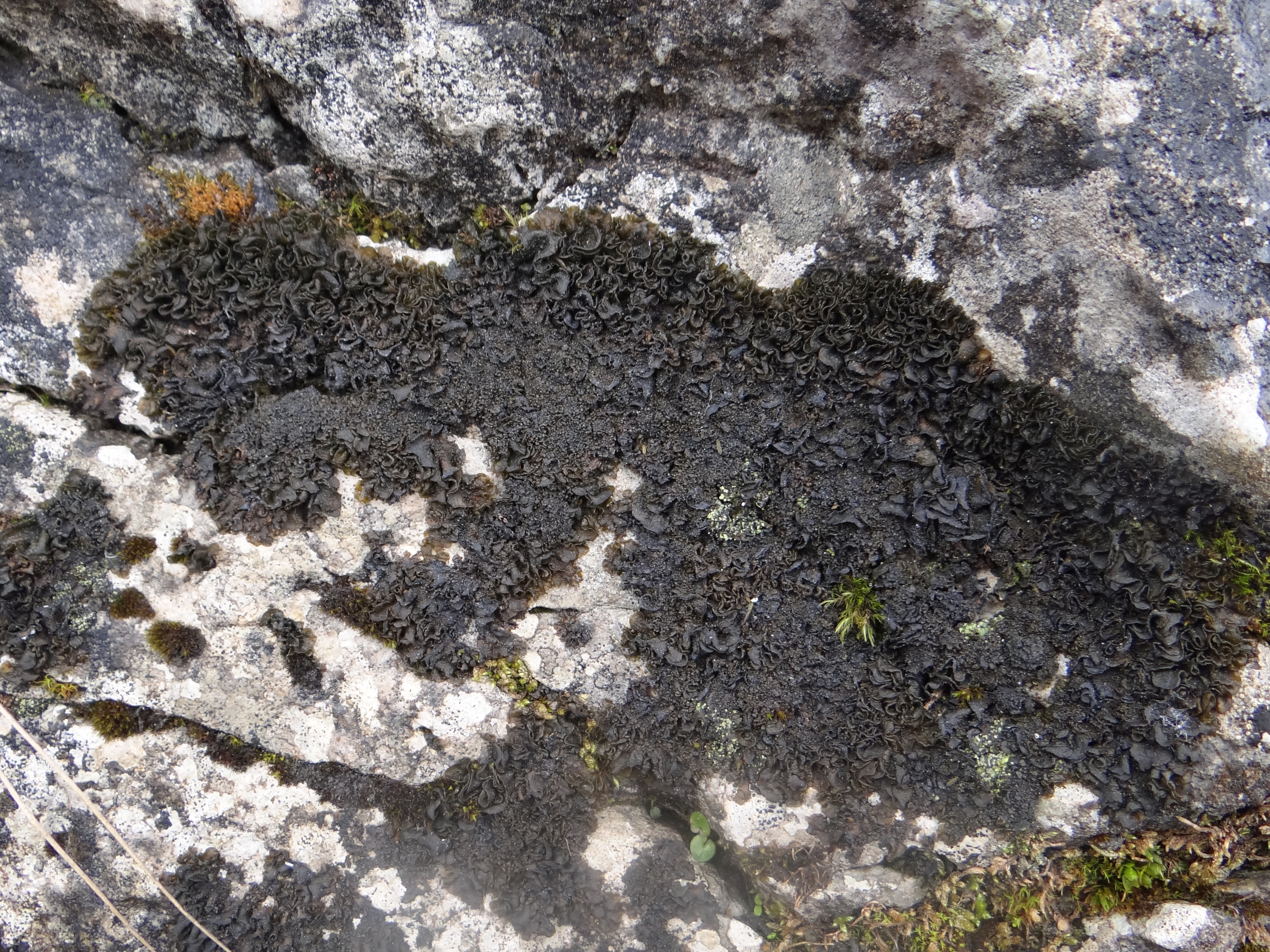
- Blennothallia crispa

Scientific classification
- Kingdom: Fungi
- Division: Ascomycota
- Class: Lecanoromycetes
- Order: Peltigerales
- Family: Collemataceae
- Genus: Blennothallia; Trevis. (1853)

Type species
- Blennothallia crispa (Weber ex F.H.Wigg.) Otálora, P.M.Jørg. & Wedin (2013)

Species
- B. crispa B. fecunda B. furfureola B. novozelandica

= Blennothallia =

Genus of lichen

Blennothallia is a genus of jelly lichens in the family Collemataceae. It has four species, which collectively have a cosmopolitan distribution.

== Taxonomy ==
The genus was circumscribed in 1853 by Italian botanist Vittore Trevisan de Saint-Léon. Although Trevisan did not select a type species for the genus, Lichen crispus was selected as lectotype in 2013. The genus corresponds to the Colema crispum species group recognized in 1954 by Gunnar Degelius. Molecular phylogenetic analysis shows that Blennothallia forms a well-supported lineage together with Scytinium and Lethagrium in the family Collemataceae.

== Description ==
Blennothallia species have a dark olive-green to black thallus that typically measures 2–5 cm (0.8–2.0 in) in diameter, comprising rounded lobes that are 0.5 mm (0.02 in) wide. The thallus lacks a cortex, and the medulla is paraplectenchymatous (fungal tissue with a cellular structure superficially like the parenchyma of vascular plants). The photobiont partner is a member of the cyanobacteriaa genus Nostoc, which occurs in clusters. Ascospores, which number eight per ascus, are either in the size range 15–20 by 7–9 μm or 26–40 by 10–18 μm.

== Habitat and distribution ==
Blennothallia lichens grow on the ground and on rocks, but rarely on bark. The genus has a cosmopolitan distribution, but is most frequently encountered in temperate regions.

== Species ==
- Blennothallia crispa (Weber ex F.H.Wigg.) Otálora, P.M.Jørg. & Wedin (2013)
- Blennothallia fecunda (Degel.) Otálora, P.M.Jørg. & Wedin (2013)
- Blennothallia furfureola (Müll.Arg.) Otálora, P.M.Jørg. & Wedin (2013)
- Blennothallia novozelandica (Degel.) Otálora, P.M.Jørg. & Wedin (2013)
