= Pseudoleptogium =

Scientific classification
- Domain: Eukaryota
- Kingdom: Fungi
- Division: Ascomycota
- Class: Lecanoromycetes
- Order: Peltigerales
- Family: Collemataceae
- Genus: Pseudoleptogium; Müll.Arg. (1885)
- Species: P. diffractum

Binomial name
- Pseudoleptogium diffractum (Kremp. ex Körb.) Müll.Arg. (1885)

Synonyms
- List: Genus; *Collema sect. Pseudoleptogium (Müll.Arg.) M.Choisy (1952); Species; *Leptogium diffractum Kremp. ex Körb. (1865); *Pterygium diffractum (Kremp. ex Körb.) Couderc (1910); *Leptogium diffractum Kremp. ex Arnold (1861); *Leptogium placodiellum Nyl. (1876); *Psorotichia diffracta var. placodiella (Nyl.) Boistel (1903)

Genus of lichens

Pseudoleptogium is a fungal genus in the family Collemataceae. It comprises the single species Pseudoleptogium diffractum, a saxicolous (rock-dwelling) crustose lichen that grows on calcareous rocks.

== Taxonomy ==
The genus was originally proposed by the Swiss lichenologist Johannes Müller Argoviensis in 1885 as a section of the genus Collema. The genus was resurrected and redescribed in 2014 as part of a molecular phylogenetics-informed reorganisation of the family Collemataceae, the jelly lichens.

== Description ==
The thallus of Pseudoleptogium is made up of tiny to small squamules (scale-like structures) that range from 0.5 to 1.0 cm in diameter. These squamules create a patchy appearance, with two different types present. Along the edges, the squamules are tightly pressed to the surface, elongated like fingers, and range from 0.4 to 1.0 mm in length and 0.2 to 0.5 mm in width. In the centre of the thallus, the squamules are much smaller, resembling tiny, convex lumps (areoles) that are 0.1 to 0.3 mm across. Over time, the central squamules may wear away, leaving behind only the radiating marginal squamules.

The overall colour of the thallus is brownish-olive to black, and the surface of the squamules has a wrinkled and glossy texture, particularly at the tips. The thallus has a protective outer layer (cortex), but it lacks other common lichen structures like isidia (vegetative reproductive structures) or tomentum (a layer of fine hairs). The medulla has a paraplectenchymatous hyphal structure, in which the cyanobiont, Nostoc, occurs in clusters.

Apothecia, the structures that produce spores for sexual reproduction, are very rare in this genus. When present, they are located on the surface of the thallus (laminal) and have a convex, olive-brown disc. Each apothecium produces eight spores per ascus (the spore-producing cell), and the spores are ellipsoid in shape, with multiple internal divisions (muriform). The spores measure 22–25 μm in length and 8–10 μm in width.

Asexual reproductive structures (pycnidia) are not known to occur in this genus.
