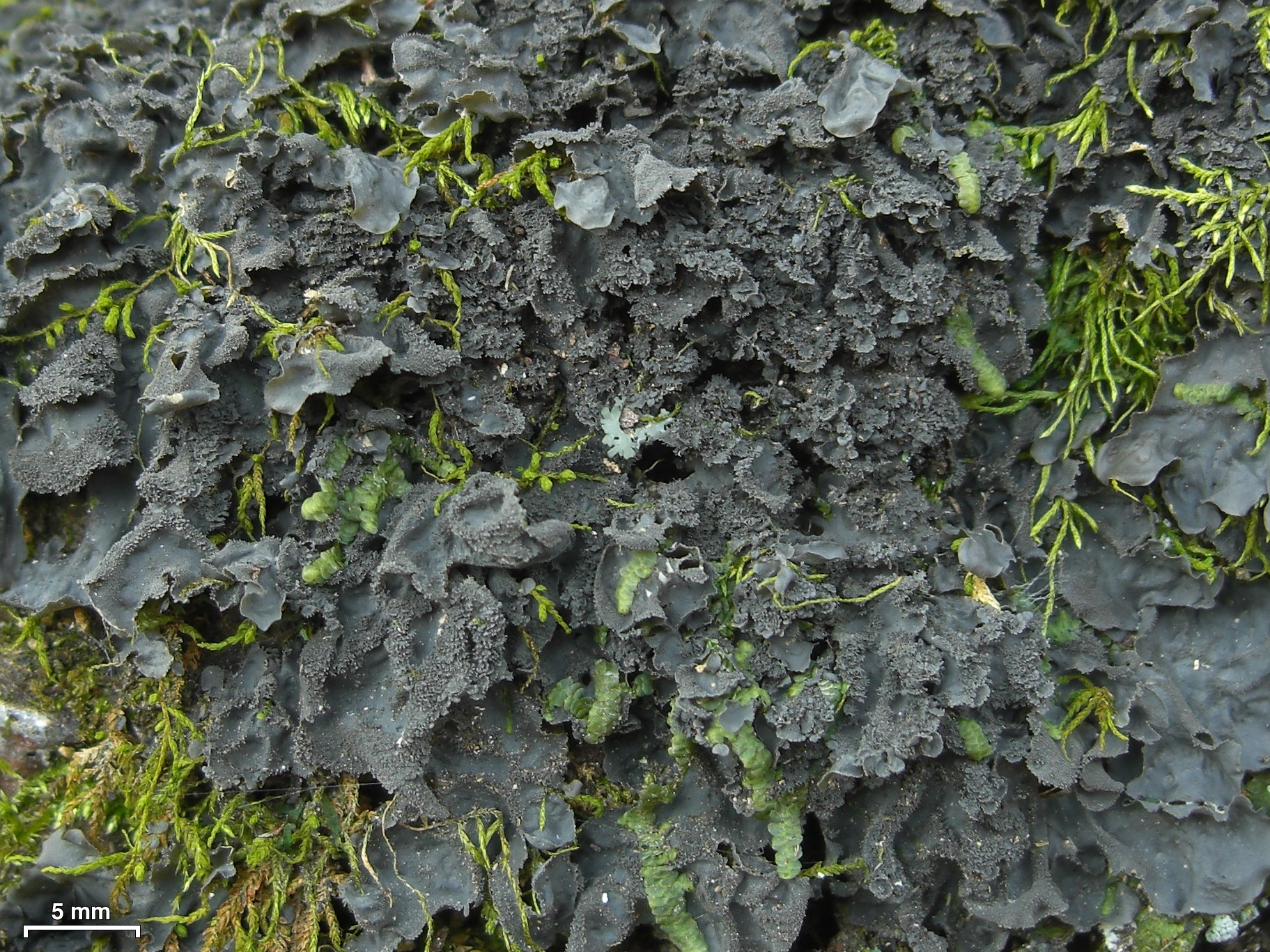
- Thallus showing abundant cylindrical isidia; photographed in North Carolina, US

Conservation status
- Secure (NatureServe)

Scientific classification
- Kingdom: Fungi
- Division: Ascomycota
- Class: Lecanoromycetes
- Order: Peltigerales
- Family: Collemataceae
- Genus: Leptogium
- Species: L. cyanescens

Binomial name
- Leptogium cyanescens (Ach.) Körb. (1855)

Synonyms
- Collema tremelloides var. cyanescens Ach. (1814); Collema cyanescens (Ach.) Rabenh. (1845); Leptogium tremelloides var. cyanescens (Ach.) Hepp (1854); Leptogium cyanizum Nyl. (1877); Stephanophorus cyanizum (Nyl.) Nyl. (1900)

= Leptogium cyanescens =

Species of lichen

Leptogium cyanescens, commonly called the blue jellyskin, is a foliose, gelatinous lichen in the family Collemataceae. It is one of the most widespread members of its genus, recorded throughout temperate and subtropical regions on at least four continents.

== Taxonomy ==
The basionym Collema tremelloides var. cyanescens was proposed by Erik Acharius in 1814. The combination under Leptogium was published by Gustav Körber in 1855, yielding the currently accepted name Leptogium cyanescens (Ach.) Körb. Older literature also lists the species under Collema cyanescens (Ach.) Rabenh, and Leptogium tremelloides var. cyanescens (Ach.) Hepp (1854), but both are now treated as synonyms.

Modern molecular sampling confirms placement in Leptogium section Leptogium in the sense of Otálora and co-workers, together with other smooth-thalloid, isidiate taxa such as L. azureum and L. denticulatum. The blue jellyskin is distinguished from those congeners by its uniformly cylindrical isidia, bluish thallus that lacks phyllidia, and the absence of cortex perforations.

== Description ==
The lichen forms soft, sheet-like thalli that become jelly-like when wet and crisp when dry. Individual rosettes usually measure 1–5 cm (0.4–2 in) across (occasionally to 10 cm (4 in)) and consist of flat, irregular lobes 4–5 mm wide. The upper surface is smooth to slightly wrinkled and characteristically blue-grey; the lower surface is similar in colour but may carry scattered tufts of white attachment hairs (haptera).

Minute, finger-shaped outgrowths called isidia cover the lobes, beginning as simple cylinders and often branching or flattening with age. These structures break off easily and serve as the main means of reproduction. Sexual fruit-bodies are rare. When present, the disc-shaped apothecia are 0.5–2 mm in diameter with a brown centre and an isidiate thalline margin. Ascospores are translucent (hyaline), usually three-septate (occasionally with an extra longitudinal septum) and measure 18–23 μm by 7–10 μm.

Like all members of the genus, L. cyanescens houses chains of the cyanobacterium Nostoc throughout its interior; no secondary lichen substances have been detected in spot tests.

== Habitat and distribution ==
NatureServe rates the species G5 ("secure") because of its virtually worldwide range and frequency. In North America it is frequent on the bark of deciduous trees from southern Canada through the eastern United States, extending westward into humid forests of British Columbia where populations are considered vulnerable to intensive logging. European records span from the British Isles and Fennoscandia to the Mediterranean; the species is also documented in Chile, the Galápagos, Madeira and South-East Asia.

Across its range L. cyanescens prefers shaded, persistently humid microsites—stream-side hardwoods, old orchards, coastal fog belts and rainforest mangroves are typical substrates. Although most collections are corticolous, the thallus can occasionally colonise shaded siliceous rock or mossy soil in spray zones beside waterfalls. Field observations from Brazil show colonies on mangrove trunks and restinga shrubs only a few metres above sea-level, demonstrating the species' tolerance for salt‐laden air.
