= Leptogium crispatellum =

Scientific classification
- Kingdom: Fungi
- Division: Ascomycota
- Class: Lecanoromycetes
- Order: Peltigerales
- Family: Collemataceae
- Genus: Leptogium
- Species: L. crispatellum

Binomial name
- Leptogium crispatellum Nyl. (1888)

Species of lichen

Leptogium crispatellum is a thin, bluish-grey gelatinous lichen in the family Collemataceae. It is characterised by narrow, crisped lobes and abundant tiny outgrowths (isidia) and small flap-like lobules used for vegetative spread. It lacks visible hairs on either surface and anchors to its substrate with short peg-like structures (hapters). The species was described from New Zealand; records also exist from Australia, Tasmania, and the subantarctic Marion and Heard Island, while older reports from maritime Antarctica require confirmation.

== Taxonomy ==
The species was originally described by William Nylander in 1888 as Leptogium crispatellum, based on corticolous material from Greymouth, New Zealand (collector R. Helms 214; holotype H-NYL 41462). In his protologue, Nylander characterised the species by its thallus structure, noting it as almost like that of Leptogium scotinum (now Scytinium gelatinosum), but distinguished by its lobes being complexly arranged and very crisp/curled, with finely crenulate margins. Nylander noted that while sterile when observed, the species might possibly represent a form of L. tremelloides that had grown together or become confluent. A modern re-examination of the type confirms that the thallus lacks hairs and is attached by short hapters. In a 2018 revision of Antarctic Leptogium, L. crispatellum was retained as a distinct, non-hairy species and used as a comparison point for the newly described Antarctic species; in mitochondrial small-subunit (mtSSU) analyses it falls within the genus' "clade B". An earlier molecular analysis resolved L. crispatellum and L. biloculare in a clade with a sister group relationship to Leptogium byssinum and L. terrenum.

The same revision cautions that earlier Antarctic identifications labelled as L. crispatellum included specimens with a hairy lower surface, anatomy that does not match the hairless type. The authors therefore treat those Antarctic records as doubtful and recommend further collections to verify whether L. crispatellum actually occurs on the continent.

== Description ==
The thallus is foliose (leaf-like), typically to about 2.5 cm across and 55–70 micrometres (μm) thick, grey to bluish grey and opaque. Lobes are about 2 mm wide, tightly crowded and often rolled back or ascending at the edges, giving a slightly "crisped" appearance. The margins are thin, and smooth to finely crenulate (scalloped); pale maculae (faint spots) may be present. The upper and lower cortices each comprise a single layer of small, isodiametric cells. No hairs occur on either surface; instead the lichen attaches by short hapters, which are minute pegs that act as anchors.

Vegetative propagation is by abundant isidia (tiny, detachable outgrowths that contain both partners of the lichen) and by small, round to oval lobules. The isidia begin granular and may flatten with age (c. 0.05–0.15 × 0.04–0.10 mm), while lobules are usually marginal to laminal and densely aggregated (c. 0.05–0.10 × 0.10–0.20 mm). Internally, the medulla contains cyanobacteria (the photosynthetic partner) embedded in a gelatinous matrix, with the fungal threads locally organised as short "columns" inclined 70–80° to the surface—a micro-feature useful to separate lookalikes. Sexual structures (apothecia) and pycnidia were not observed in the material examined for the revision.

== Habitat and distribution ==
The type specimen was corticolous at Greymouth, New Zealand, and the species is otherwise recorded from New Zealand, Australia, Tasmania, and the subantarctic Marion and Heard Islands. Older literature also listed the South Shetland Islands (maritime Antarctica), but the 2018 study found that the Antarctic material cited as L. crispatellum had hairs on the lower side and did not match the hairless type; those collections may represent different species. Until new, matching collections are made, the authors suggest that occurrence in Antarctica should be treated as unconfirmed. Within New Zealand, it has been recorded on Great Island in the Three Kings Islands, where it occurs on bark and soil at exposed cliff-tops, on soil in coastal forest, and on bark in Leptospermum forest.
