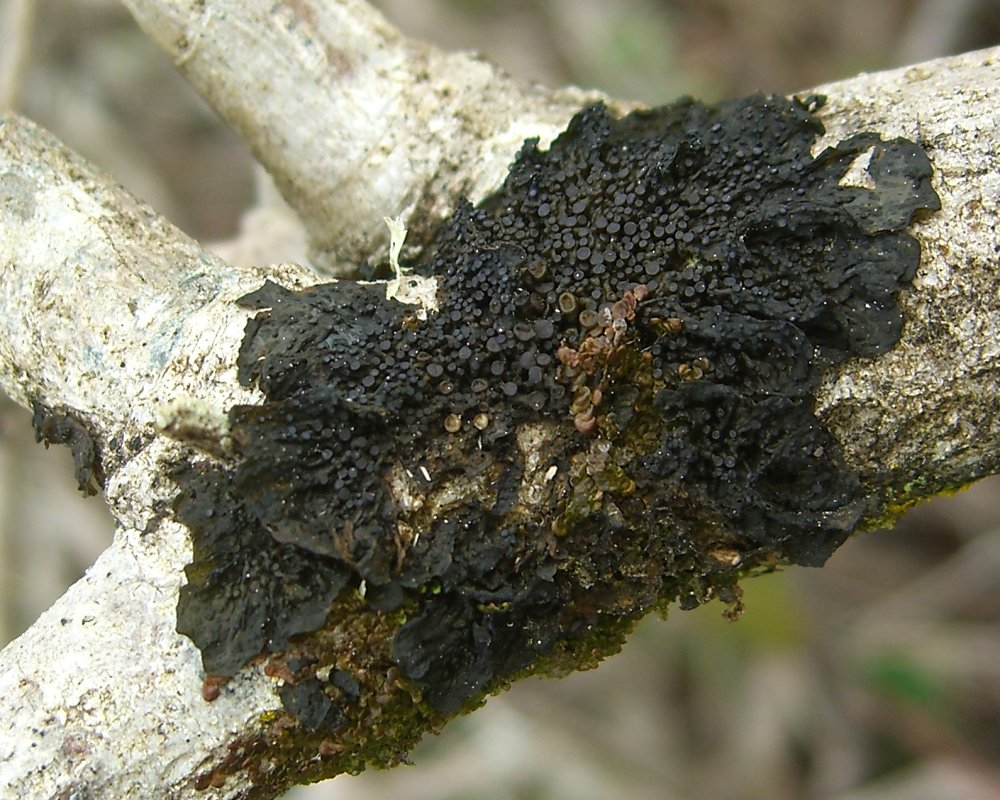
- Collema nigrescens

Scientific classification
- Kingdom: Fungi
- Division: Ascomycota
- Class: Lecanoromycetes
- Order: Peltigerales
- Family: Collemataceae; Zenker (1827)

Type genus
- Collema F.H.Wigg. (1780)

Genera
- See text

= Collemataceae =

Family of lichen-forming fungi

The Collemataceae are a family of mostly lichen-forming fungi in the order Peltigerales. The family contains twelve genera and about 325 species. The family has a widespread distribution.

== Taxonomy ==
The family was circumscribed by Jonathan Carl Zenker in 1827; Collema is the type genus.

== Description ==
Collemataceae members have a thallus that is either foliose, crustose, squamulose or minutely shrubby. The thallus is gelatinous, sometimes swelling when wet, with a colour ranging from dark olive-green to brown-black, reddish brown or rarely grey-blue. The upper and lower cortex is either absent or composed of angular brick-like cells, more rarely of flattened compressed cells. The medulla contains loosely interwoven narrow hyphae or is compact with broad-short-celled hyphae; these hyphae are intermixed with the photobiont. The texture of the upper cortex surface ranges from smooth to wrinkled or ridged, and is often glossy, but rarely arachnoid. The underside of the cortex is smooth, arachnoid or hairy, sometimes with scattered hapters or groups of white rhizines. Isidia are often present, while soredia are absent. The photobiont partner is Nostoc (rarely Stigonema), with their cells often arranged in distinct chains.

== Genera ==
This is a list of the genera in the Collemataceae, based on a 2020 review and summary of fungal classification by Wijayawardene and colleagues, and including a new genus, Hondaria, circumscribed in 2020. Following the genus name is the taxonomic authority (those who first circumscribed the genus; standardized author abbreviations are used), year of publication, and the number of species:

- Blennothallia Trevis. (1853) – 4 spp.
- Callome Otálora & Wedin (2013) – 1 sp.
- Collema Weber ex F.H.Wigg. (1780) – ca. 35 spp.
- Enchylium (Ach.) Gray (1821) – 11 spp.
- Epiphloea Trevis. (1880) – 2 spp.
- Hondaria Kitaura & A.P.Lorenz (2020) – 1 sp.
- Lathagrium (Ach.) Gray (1821) – 10 spp.
- Leptogium (Ach.) Gray (1821) – ca. 110 spp.
- Paracollema Otálora & Wedin (2013) – 2 spp.
- Pseudoleptogium Müll.Arg. (1885) – 1 sp.
- Rostania Trevis. (1880) – 3 + 4 orphaned spp.
- Scytinium (Ach.) Gray (1821) – 49 spp.
