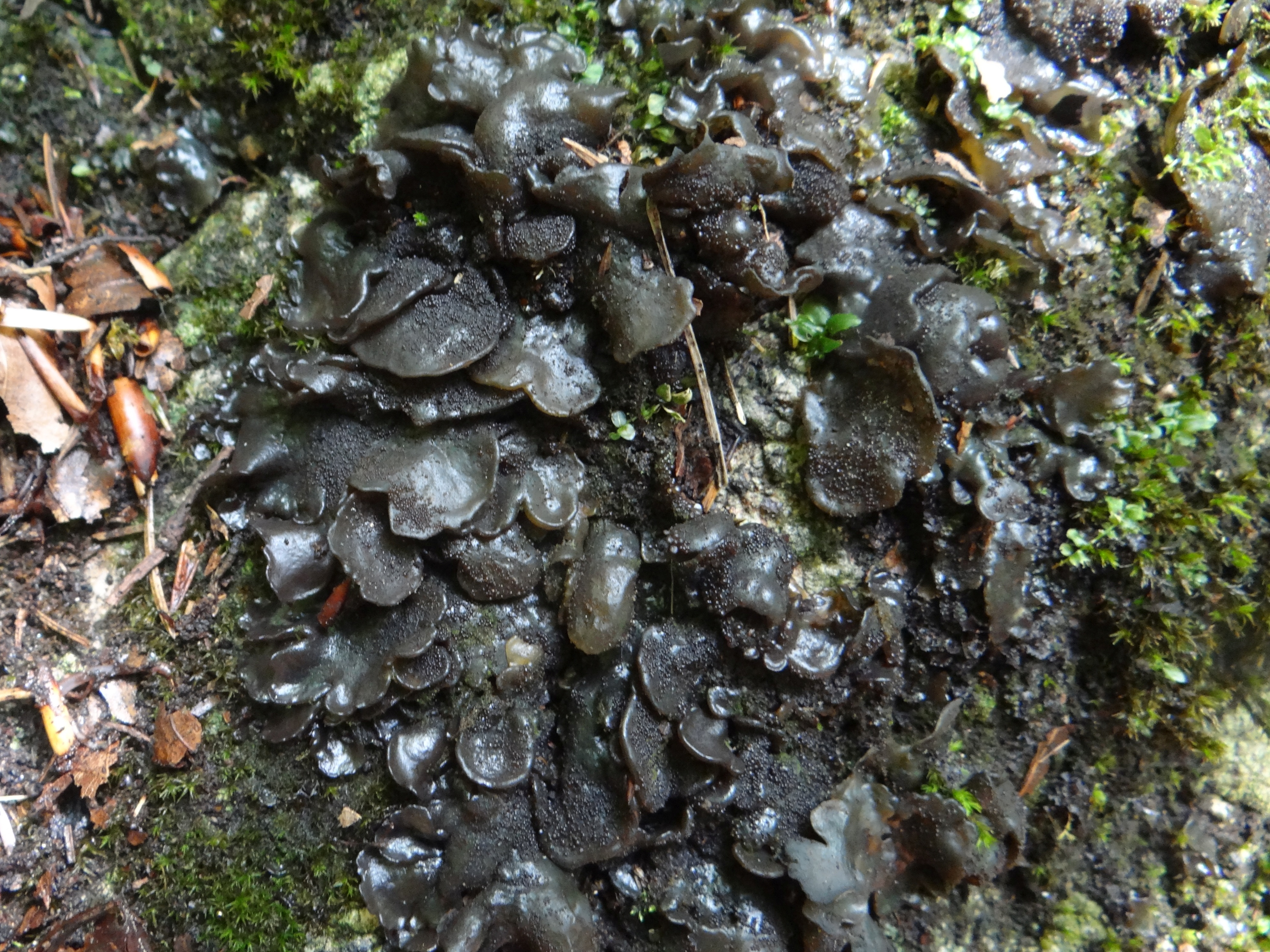
- Lathagrium auriforme

Scientific classification
- Kingdom: Fungi
- Division: Ascomycota
- Class: Lecanoromycetes
- Order: Peltigerales
- Family: Collemataceae
- Genus: Lathagrium (Ach.) Gray (1821)

Type species
- Lathagrium undulatum (Laurer ex Flot.) Poetsch (1872)

Synonyms
- Collema subgen. Lathagrium Ach. (1810)

= Lathagrium =

Genus of lichen

Lathagrium is a genus of lichen-forming fungi in the family Collemataceae. It has 10 species of gelatinous lichens. Species in this genus typically grow on calcareous rocks, often amidst mosses, but can also be found on siliceous or serpentine rocks, mortar, or soil.

== Taxonomy ==
Lathagrium was introduced by Erik Acharius in 1810 as a section of Collema, and raised to generic rank by Samuel Gray in 1821. In their modern re-appraisal of the jelly-lichens (Collemataceae), Otálora and colleagues fixed the name by designating Lathagrium furvum (≡ Lichen fuscovirens With.) as lectotype. They also note that Massalongo's later spelling "Lethagrium" refers to the same name and is merely an orthographic variant that fell out of use; both Acharius and Gray had originally included several unrelated species under the heading.

The molecular classification places Lathagrium as the well-supported sister lineage to Scytinium. In delimiting the genus, the authors emphasise features that separate it from its near relatives: Lathagrium species are medium- to large-foliose jelly lichens lacking a true cortex and bearing mainly submuriform spores—i.e., spores divided by cross-walls and a few lengthwise walls so they appear brick-like under the microscope—and they are chiefly rock- or soil-dwelling (saxicolous/terricolous), whereas Collema is mostly bark-dwelling (corticolous). They also distinguish Lathagrium from Enchylium by lobe and apothecial rim (proper exciple) morphology: Lathagrium has swollen, pleated (plicate) lobes, while Enchylium has concave, undulate lobes that are never pleated.

In practical taxonomy, Lathagrium is treated as comprising the Cristatum and Durietzii groups as previously described by Gunnar Degelius; the latter were not sampled in the phylogeny but are judged to belong here based on habit and habitat. To bring names into line with this circumscription, the authors effected ten new combinations transferring species from Collema into Lathagrium.

== Description ==
Lathagrium is characterized by a foliose, medium to large-sized thallus that can appear gelatinous and may swell when wet. The color of the upper surface ranges from dark olive-green to brown-black and occasionally exhibits a grey-blue hue. The lobes of the thallus can be narrow or broad, often elongated and intricately branched, with a flat or concave surface that can be smooth or distinctly ridged or folded.

The thallus is composed of intertwined hyphae intermingled with chains of photobiont cells, and it lacks both upper and lower cortex. While isidia can be absent or frequently present, soredia are not found in Lathagrium. The reproductive structures, called apothecia, display a pale brown, red-brown, or brown-black disc surrounded by a thalline margin that is typically long-lasting.

The internal structure of the apothecia consists of colourless or pigmented epithecium, a colorless hymenium that turns blue when treated with iodine, and a nearly colorless hypothecium. The hamathecium contains paraphyses that separate in a solution of potassium hydroxide and may be unbranched or branched, often connecting near the apices. The tips of the paraphyses can be club-shaped or round and display a yellowish to reddish-brown colour.

The asci, or spore-producing structures, are club-shaped (clavate) with a significantly thickened apex that reacts blue with iodine, as does the downwardly projecting annulus and apical cap. Lathagrium produces eight spores per ascus, which are septate and primarily submuriform, but can also be spindle-shaped or cylindrical with only transverse septa.

Conidiomata, or pycnidia, are generally embedded within the thallus and can be found on the margins or lamina with a pale ostiole. The conidia are rod-shaped and may be slightly enlarged at the apex. Chemical analysis using thin-layer chromatography has not detected any lichen products in Lathagrium.

== Species ==
- Lathagrium auriforme (With.) Otálora, P.M.Jørg. & Wedin (2013)
- Lathagrium cristatum (L.) Otálora, P.M.Jørg. & Wedin (2013)
- Lathagrium dichotomum (With.) Otálora, P.M.Jørg. & Wedin (2013)
- Lathagrium durietzii (Degel.) Otálora, P.M.Jørg. & Wedin (2013)
- Lathagrium fuscovirens (With.) Otálora, P.M.Jørg. & Wedin (2013)
- Lathagrium latzelii (Zahlbr.) Otálora, P.M.Jørg. & Wedin (2013)
- Lathagrium neglectum (Degel.) Otálora, P.M.Jørg. & Wedin (2013)
- Lathagrium poeltii (Degel.) Otálora, P.M.Jørg. & Wedin (2013)
- Lathagrium subundulatum (Degel.) Otálora, P.M.Jørg. & Wedin (2013)
- Lathagrium undulatum (Laurer ex Flot.) Poetsch (1872)
