= Collema coniophilum =

Conservation status
- Imperiled (NatureServe)

Scientific classification
- Kingdom: Fungi
- Division: Ascomycota
- Class: Lecanoromycetes
- Order: Peltigerales
- Family: Collemataceae
- Genus: Collema
- Species: C. coniophilum

Binomial name
- Collema coniophilum Goward (2009)

Species of lichen

Collema coniophilum, the crumpled tarpaper lichen, is a species of foliose lichen in the family Collemataceae, first found in inland rainforests of British Columbia. This small, leaf-like lichen forms dark olive-green to black lobes that become thicker at the tips and develop a wrinkled appearance with age. The species gets its name from its preference for growing on tree branches that are coated with calcareous road dust. It is known to occur in several locations in British Columbia's humid inland temperate rainforest belt, and in Alaska.

== Taxonomy ==
The species was described as new to science in 2009 by the Canadian lichenologist Trevor Goward. The type specimen was collected along Bowron Lake Road in the Fraser River drainage of east-central British Columbia. The epithet coniophilum derives from the Greek konis ('dust') and philos ('loving'), referring to the lichen's regular occurrence on tree branches coated with calcareous road dust. It has been given the vernacular name "crumpled tarpaper lichen".

Because the lichen has never produced apothecia (fruiting bodies), its exact relationships must be inferred from external characters alone. Morphologically it fits best within the Collema cristatum group—a cluster of otherwise rock-dwelling species limited to the Northern Hemisphere—on account of its thickened lobe tips, abundant coarse isidia, and the distinctive pustules that become ridged and folded towards the margins. If that placement is confirmed by future DNA work, C. coniophilum would be the first truly bark-dwelling member of the group; earlier collections had been misidentified as an arboreal form of C. auriforme, which lacks pustules and shows a different pattern of isidia.

== Description ==
Collema coniophilum is a small, loosely attached, leaf-like lichen whose individual thalli seldom exceed about 2–3 cm in diameter. The body is made up of several broad, rounded lobes 2–4 mm wide; each lobe becomes markedly thicker towards the tip, where the margin forms a smooth rim roughly a third of a millimetre deep when the thallus is moist. The upper surface is dark olive-green to almost black, at first smooth but soon dotted with low pustules that lengthen into ridges and ultimately form a network of narrow folds, giving the lobe tips a wrinkled look. Throughout the upper surface, coarse, blackish isidia—minute, crumb-like outgrowths 50–200 μm across—develop and often extend right to the growing edge, providing most day-to-day reproduction.

The underside is the same dark olive tint, fading toward beige near the centre; true root-like rhizines are absent, though tiny white hairs may appear in patches. No sexual fruit-bodies (apothecia) have ever been observed, but pale yellow, flask-shaped pycnidia up to 0.2 mm wide are occasional and release rod-shaped conidia about 4.5 × 1.5 μm. Standard chemical spot tests detect no lichen products, and thin-layer chromatography is likewise negative, a feature that helps separate the species from chemically active look-alikes.

== Habitat and distribution ==
The species was originally considered endemic to British Columbia, with seven documented localities scattered between the humid Rocky Mountain Trench, about 65 km east of Prince George, and the upper Adams River valley in the Columbia Mountains. All sites lie in the wettest, coolest parts of the inland temperate rainforest belt and occur in stands at least a century old. C. coniophilum grows on the bark of a range of conifers—subalpine fir (Abies lasiocarpa), white spruce (Picea glauca), western redcedar (Thuja plicata), western hemlock (Tsuga heterophylla)—as well as black cottonwood (Populus trichocarpa). The branches it colonises are typically dusted with wind-borne limestone particles from nearby roads or riverbanks. In 2010, it was recorded from Klondike Gold Rush National Historical Park in Alaska. Collema coniophilum is of national conservation concern in Canada.
