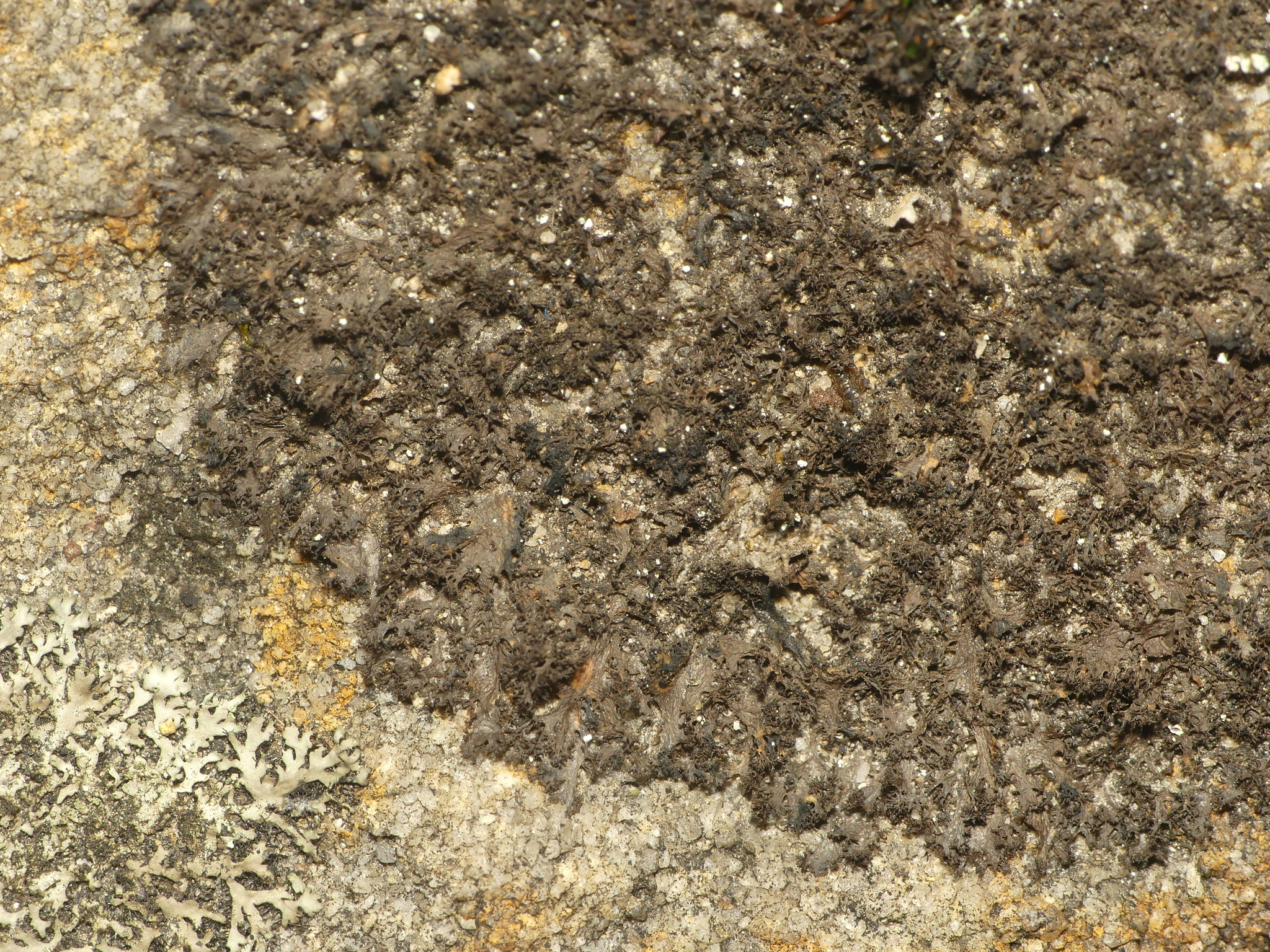

Conservation status
- Secure (NatureServe)

Scientific classification
- Kingdom: Fungi
- Division: Ascomycota
- Class: Lecanoromycetes
- Order: Peltigerales
- Family: Collemataceae
- Genus: Scytinium
- Species: S. lichenoides

Binomial name
- Scytinium lichenoides (L.) Otálora, P.M.Jørg. & Wedin (2013)

Synonyms
- Tremella lichenoides L. (1753); Lichen lichenoides (L.) Wulfen (1791); Fucus lichenoides (L.) J.F.Gmel. (1792); Leptogium lichenoides (L.) Zahlbr. (1924); Collema lichenoides (L.) M.Choisy (1952); Lichen tremelloides Weiss (1770); Lemniscium tremelloides (Weiss) Wallr. (1827)

= Scytinium lichenoides =

Species of lichen-forming fungus

Scytinium lichenoides, the tattered jellyskin, is a species of lichen in the family Collemataceae. Originally described by Carl Linnaeus in 1753 as Tremella lichenoides, the species has undergone several taxonomic revisions and was transferred to the genus Scytinium in 2013 following molecular phylogenetics studies. It is characterised by its distinctive fringed appearance, with lobe margins bearing numerous small cylindrical outgrowths that give the lichen a tattered look. The species shows a preference for base-rich substrates and typically grows among moss cushions on rock or thin soil over rock in moist conditions.

== Taxonomy ==
Carl Linnaeus first described the species as Tremella lichenoides in his 1753 Species Plantarum. His short Latin diagnosis characterises it as having upright, flat fronds with margins that are crisped and lacinulate, and he noted its habitat as "among mosses, in shady places, towards the mountains". Linnaeus cross-referenced earlier accounts and figures by Dillenius, Micheli, Morison, and to his own Flora Svecica.

After it was pointed out that Linnaeus's genus Tremella (as typified) applies to cyanobacterial Nostoc rather than a lichen, meaning Tremella lichenoides is not a validly published lichen name, Per Magnus Jørgensen (2009) proposed conserving Wulfen's Lichen lichenoides (1791) to preserve long-standing usage. He fixed the application of the name by designating a conserved type (the lower specimen of Herb. Linnaeus 1276.9, LINN), and at the same time proposed rejecting earlier competing names for this taxon—Lichen tremelloides Weiss (1770; lectotypified with Dillenius, Hist. Musc. t. 19 f. 31, epitype at the herbarium of the University of Oxford) and Lichen tremella Roth (1788; neotypified with the same Linnaean specimen)—so that a disruptive change to Leptogium tremelloides would be avoided.

In 2013, Otálora, Jørgensen and Wedin overhauled the generic boundaries in Collemataceae using a four-gene phylogeny and formalised ten genera. They explained that Gray (1821) raised Leptogium to generic rank and that Clements and Shear (1931) later typified the genus with L. lichenoides—a choice that, in light of current knowledge, would destabilise many names. To maintain stability they proposed conserving Leptogium with a different type, L. azureum. They resurrected Scytinium and transferred a suite of small- to medium-sized jelly lichens there from Leptogium and Collema, publishing the new combination Scytinium lichenoides. In their scheme, Scytinium accommodates taxa with muriform spores and generally smaller thalli that are often bryophilous, terricolous or saxicolous and that may have a true cortex or a pseudocortex, whereas Leptogium is retained for the larger, chiefly corticolous, eucorticate species.

== Description ==
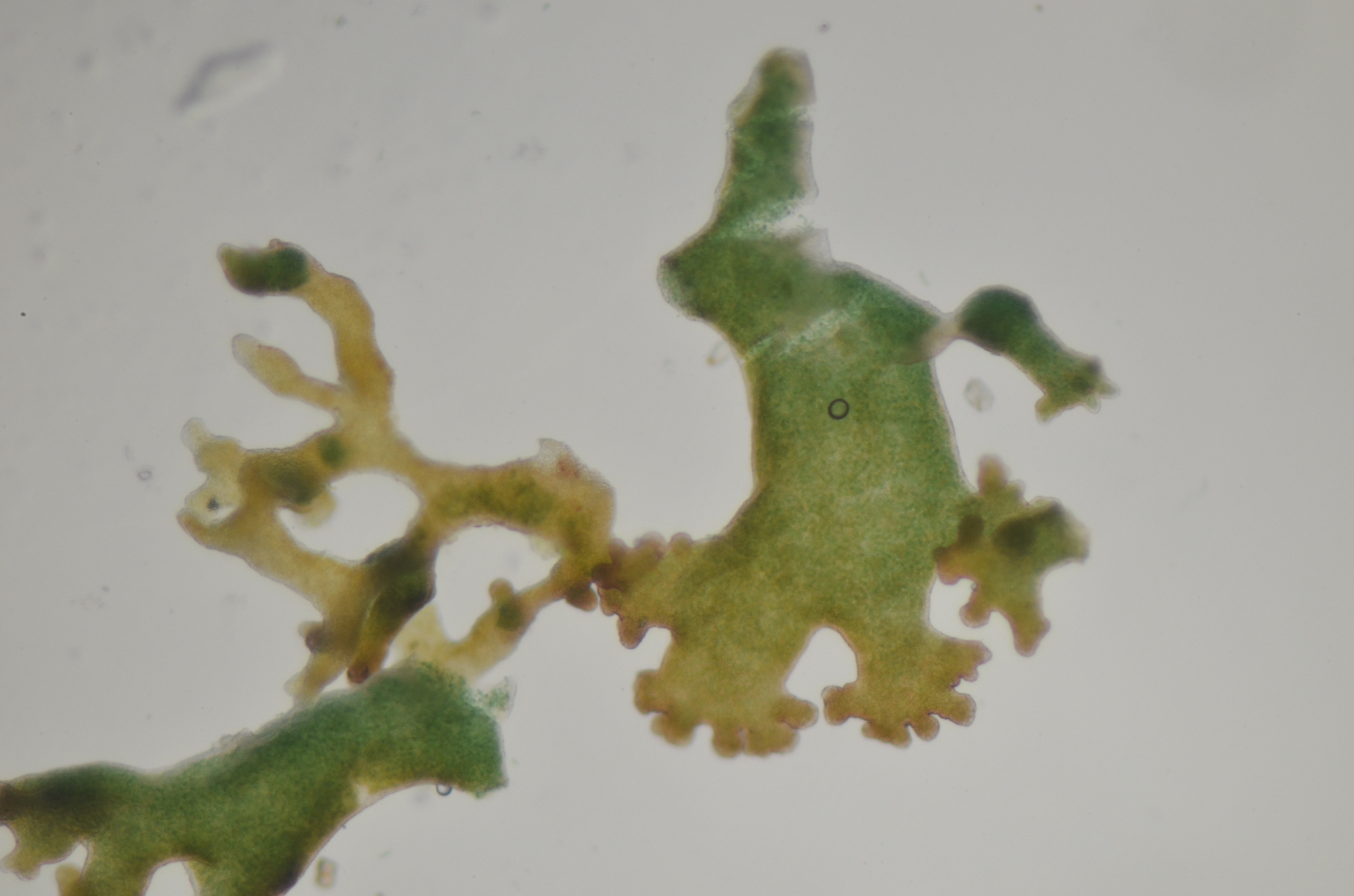
Closeup of lobes showing the characteristic fringed margins with numerous small cylindrical outgrowths

Scytinium lichenoides is a jelly lichen with lobes that often look fringed: the lobe margins, and sometimes their surfaces, bear many small cylindrical outgrowths that resemble isidia (minute, finger-like vegetative propagules). These may be simple or branched and can be so dense that the edges appear fibrillose. The upper surface is smooth to wrinkled, sometimes with a few ridges, and typically shiny. The lower surface is usually conspicuously ridged, often with vertically oriented ribs, and may become slightly cobwebby near the base. In section, the thallus shows a distinct cortex of angular cells over a medulla of intertwined fungal hyphae.

Fruiting bodies (apothecia) are uncommon and tiny, about 0.3–1 mm across, with a thalline margin that also bears isidia. The ascospores are muriform (divided by internal septa into a brick-like pattern) and typically measure 33–45 μm long (occasionally 26–50 μm) by 12–15 μm wide, usually with around seven transverse septa (range five to nine).

== Habitat and distribution ==
Scytinium lichenoides typically grows among moss cushions on rock or thin soil over rock, and will also occur on the lower parts of tree trunks in persistently moist climates. Field floras consistently note a preference for base-rich substrates: it is commonly found on mossy calcareous rock in northern Canada, intermixed with moss on outcrops and scree in the Pacific Northwest, and among mosses over rocks in montane forests of the Sonoran Desert region.

The species is widespread across the Holarctic, from Arctic and boreal regions of North America through temperate zones extending south to Arizona and Baja California, and is well documented throughout Europe. It occurs from montane to subalpine elevations and is well recorded within the British Isles.

== See also ==
- List of lichens named by Carl Linnaeus
