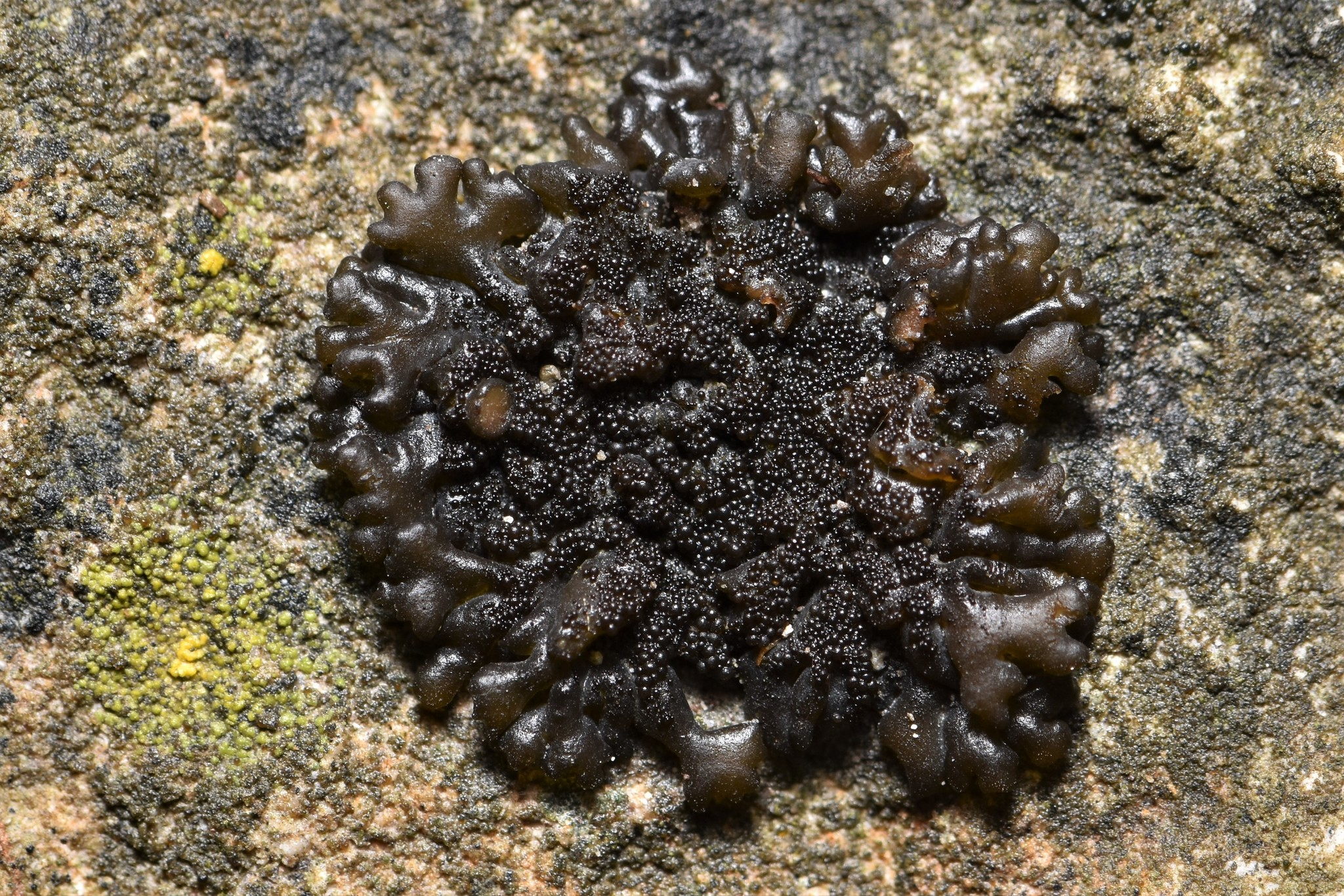

Scientific classification
- Kingdom: Fungi
- Division: Ascomycota
- Class: Lecanoromycetes
- Order: Peltigerales
- Family: Collemataceae
- Genus: Lathagrium
- Species: L. fuscovirens

Binomial name
- Lathagrium fuscovirens (With.) Otálora, P.M.Jørg. & Wedin (2013)

Synonyms
- Lichen fuscovirens With. (1776); Collema fuscovirens (With.) J.R.Laundon (1984)

= Lathagrium fuscovirens =

Species of lichen-forming fungus

Lathagrium fuscovirens, the crumpled rock jelly, is a species of lichen-forming fungus in the family Collemataceae. It forms dark olive-green to blackish, leaf-like growths up to 5 cm across that have a jelly-like texture when wet. Small bead-like propagules called isidia are often abundant on its surface. The species grows on hard limestone and similar calcareous rock, and is found across much of Europe, parts of North America including eastern Canada and the western and eastern United States, and in Africa and western Asia. It was first described in 1776 from material collected near Oxford.

== Taxonomy ==
The species was first scientifically described by William Withering in 1776 as Lichen fuscovirens. In his brief protologue, Withering described it as a leafy, flattened lichen with a jelly-like consistency, brownish to green-brown in colour, divided into lobes thicker than the rest of the thallus, and with tubercles scattered near the margins. He reported it from rocks near Marston, in the neighbourhood of Oxford, and cited an earlier illustration by Johann Jacob Dillenius.

In 2012, Linda in Arcadia proposed conserving Lichen fuscovirens against the earlier Lichen pulcher, which technically had priority. She noted that both names were based on the same Dillenius illustration, since the original herbarium material for Leers's Lichen pulcher had been destroyed. She also observed that when Jack Laundon introduced the combination Collema fuscovirens in 1984, he appears to have been unaware of the older competing name, and that fuscovirens was subsequently taken up widely in checklists and floras, largely replacing Collema tunaeforme. In 2023, the Nomenclature Committee for Fungi declined to recommend conservation, concluding that both names shared the same Dillenius illustration as type, and that since the epithet fuscovirens had been in use for only a few decades—having replaced Lichen tuniformis when Laundon revived it in 1984—the resulting instability did not justify formal conservation.

Although this species was not the main subject of the study, it was included in a 2015 molecular phylogeny of the Collemataceae based on mitochondrial SSU rDNA and the nuclear gene MCM7. In that analysis, Lathagrium fuscovirens grouped with other species of Lathagrium, including L. undulatum, L. auriforme, and L. cristatum.

Lathagrium fuscovirens is commonly known as the "crumpled rock jelly".

== Description ==
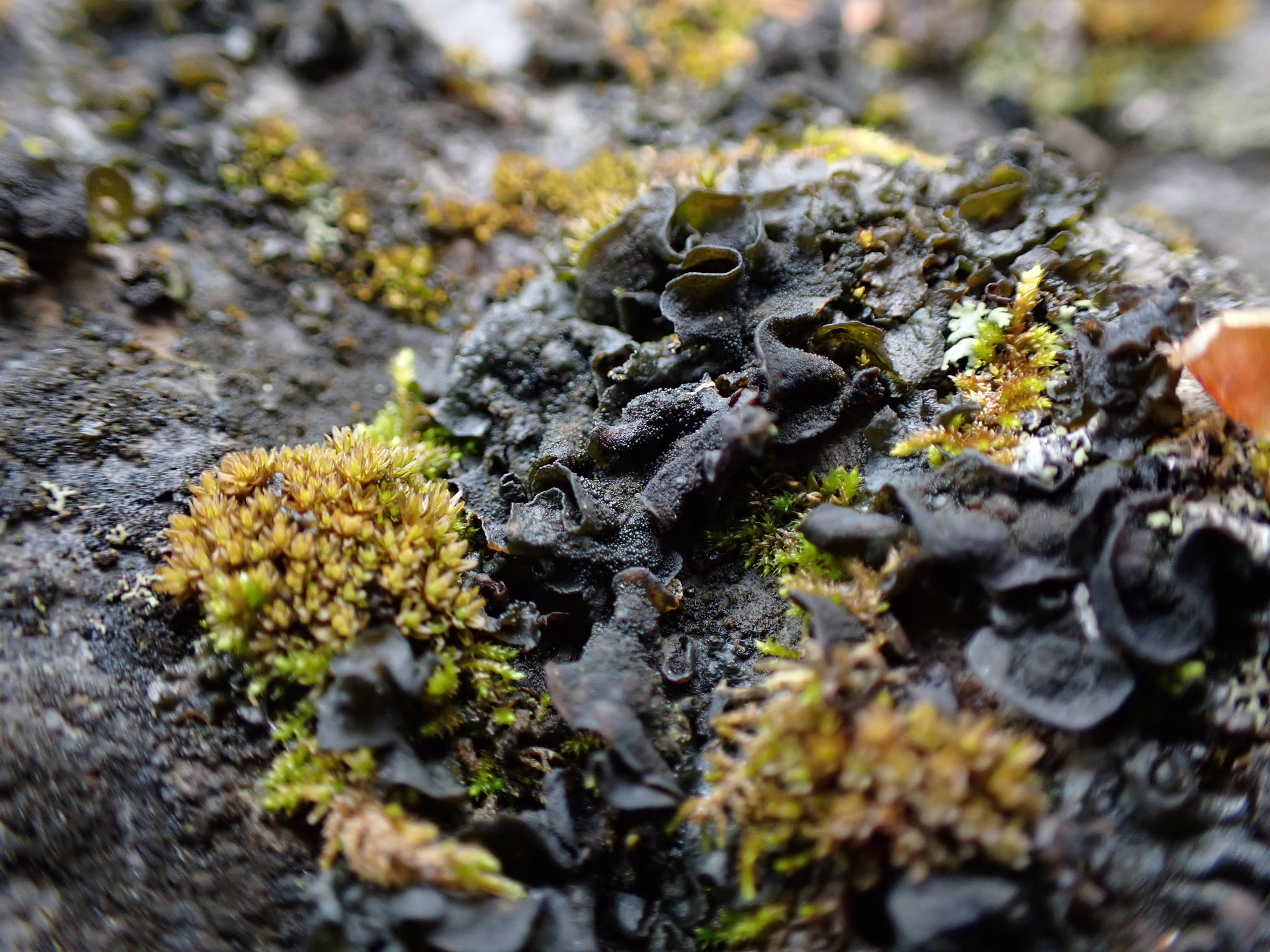
Lathagrium fuscovirens growing among moss on a rock in British Columbia, Canada

Lathagrium fuscovirens has a foliose thallus 3–5 cm across that is more or less rounded or irregular in outline and lies closely attached to the substrate. It is deeply lobed, with relatively few extended lobes 2–6 mm wide that are often repeatedly branched. The lobe margins are somewhat rounded, wavy, and slightly ascending, but they are never swollen. The upper surface is dark olive-green to nearly black, becoming paler and somewhat translucent when wet. It usually bears conspicuous blister-like bumps, and may sometimes have a greyish or bluish tinge. Small rounded isidia occur on both the upper surface and the lobe margins. These are often numerous and may partly cover the thallus, giving it a scurfy appearance.

Apothecia may be numerous or sparse. Their discs are 0.5–1.5 mm wide and are flat, sometimes with a somewhat thick thalline margin; the surface may be smooth or bear isidia. The ascospores measure 15–24 by 6.5–13 μm and are ovoid to ellipsoid and somewhat muriform, usually with three transverse septa and one longitudinal septum.

All standard chemical spot tests (K, KC, C, P) are negative, and the lichen is not known to contain any lichen products.

== Habitat and distribution ==
Lathagrium fuscovirens grows on hard calcareous rock and on walls, in habitats ranging from exposed sites to moister situations. It is only occasionally recorded from asbestos roofs. In Great Britain and Ireland, it is frequent overall, although it is rare across most of Scotland. It has also been recorded from Austria, Finland, Sweden, Turkey, Russia (northwest Caucasus), and Ukraine. In North America, it occurs in Eastern Canada, and is widespread in the United States, including Alaska, the Pacific Northwest, the Rocky Mountains, and in eastern temperate, Midwest, and northeast regions. It is also found in Africa.

A 2018 microbiome study sampled Lathagrium fuscovirens on exposed dry rocks at Kesselfallklamm in Austria. In that study, the lichen's cyanobacterial photobiont was identified as a Nostoc lineage, and its associated bacterial community resembled that of Lathagrium cristatum from the same dry, exposed rocky habitat.
