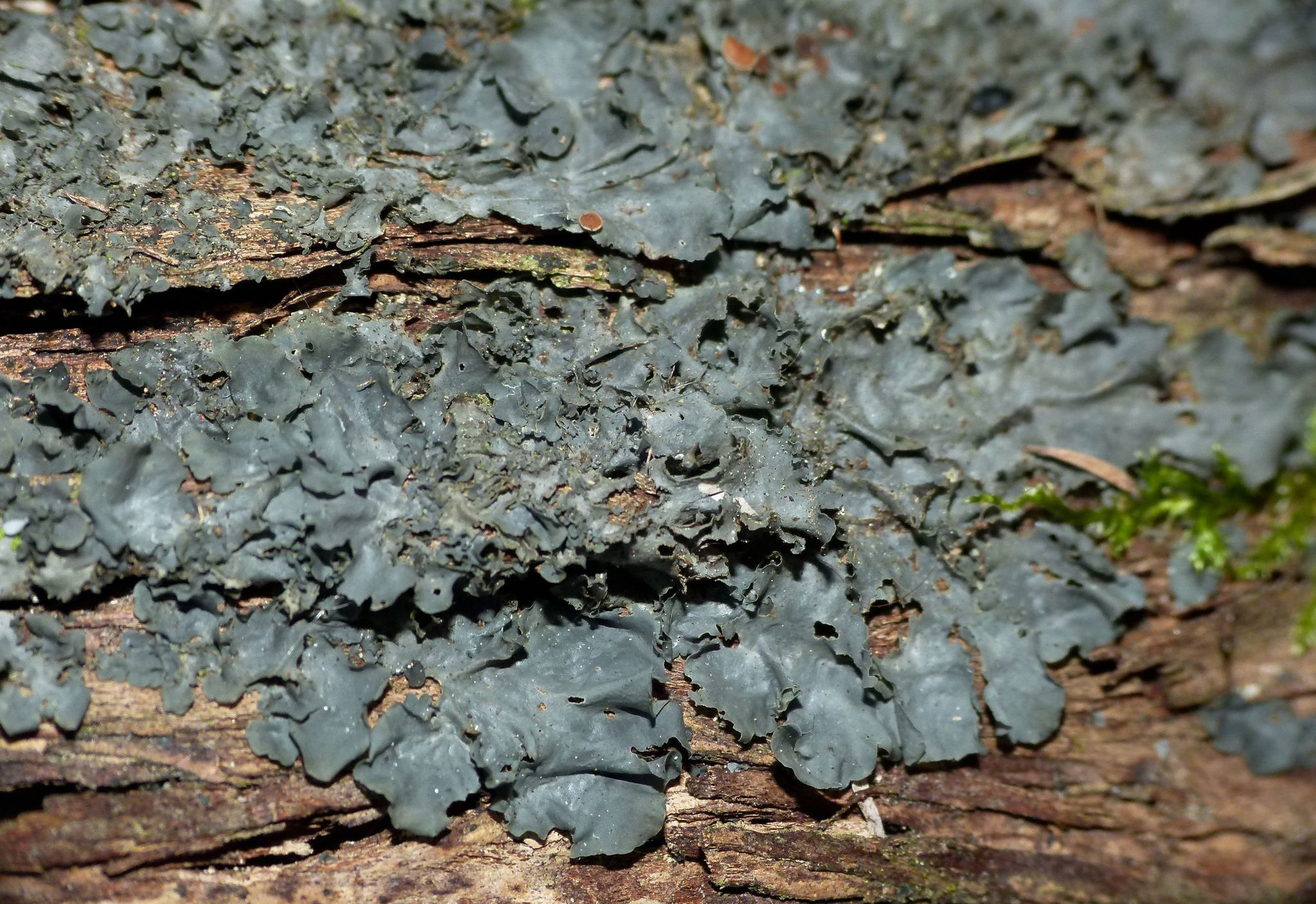

Scientific classification
- Kingdom: Fungi
- Division: Ascomycota
- Class: Lecanoromycetes
- Order: Peltigerales
- Family: Collemataceae
- Genus: Collema
- Species: C. subconveniens

Binomial name
- Collema subconveniens Nyl. (1888)

Synonyms
- Leptogium olivaceum F.Wilson (1889); Leptogium olivaceum var. isidiosum F.Wilson (1889); Collema laeve f. isidiosum (F.Wilson) F.Wilson (1893); Leptogium tremelloides var. muscitegens F.Wilson (1893)

= Collema subconveniens =

Species of lichen-forming fungus

Collema subconveniens is a species of jelly lichen in the family Collemataceae. It forms a soft, leafy thallus on tree bark and is characterised by its firm texture and distinctive ascospores that have multiple cross-walls. Originally described in 1888 from New Zealand, the species is now known from scattered locations across the Southern Hemisphere including Australia, South America, Japan, and India.

== Taxonomy ==
Collema subconveniens was formally described as a new species by the Finnish lichenologist William Nylander in 1888, in his treatment of New Zealand lichens. In the Latin protologue he characterised it as closely resembling Collema flaccidum but with a firmer, smoother thallus lacking any farinose covering, and with turgid, fusiform ascospores that are three-septate with one or more additional longitudinal septa, measuring 0.023–0.027 mm long and 0.009–0.010 mm wide. Nylander also noted that the thin, non-reactive thallus lamina was about 0.1 mm thick when dry and 0.125 mm when moist, and that the species was corticolous, based on material sent to him as "C. flaccidum".

Several names introduced a few years later by the Australian lichenologist Frances Wilson are now regarded as synonyms of Collema subconveniens. These include Leptogium olivaceum and Leptogium olivaceum var. isidiosum, both described in 1889 from Victoria, as well as Collema laeve f. isidiosum and Leptogium tremelloides var. muscitegens, which Wilson published in 1893.

== Description ==
Collema subconveniens forms a soft, leafy (foliose) thallus up to 8 cm across. The thallus is membranous and closely attached to the substrate, though parts may lift and become slightly ascending. Its surface is smooth or only faintly ridged, and it bears sparse, scale-like isidia. The lobes are up to 8 mm wide, overlapping and often somewhat undulate, with a flat, matt to slightly glossy surface. When moist they are light grey-green to light olive-green, turning brown on drying.

The species is usually richly fertile, with numerous laminal apothecia up to 1.5 mm in diameter. These are sessile with a slightly constricted base, and have a thin, entire thalline margin that may become inconspicuous with age. The apothecial disc is initially flat but often becomes convex, matt or occasionally shiny, and lacks any whitish frost (epruinose), varying in colour from pale red through dark red to brown. The asci measure 52–110 μm by 15–24 μm and contain ascospores 20–40 μm by 8–10.5 μm, which are fusiform to ellipsoidal, straight with pointed ends, and muriform with 3–5 transverse and 1–3 longitudinal septa, sometimes with strong constrictions. Asexual reproduction occurs through numerous laminal pycnidia up to 200 μm wide with a pale yellow pycnidial gel; they produce straight conidia 4–5 μm by 1–1.5 μm that are slightly swollen towards the ends.

== Distribution ==
Collema subconveniens is a corticolous lichen, growing on the bark of shrubs and trees. Beyond New Zealand and Australia, the lichen has been recorded in South America, Japan, and India. In Nepal, Collema subconveniens has been reported at 1,260 m elevation in a compilation of published records.
