= Scytinium tetrasporum =

Scientific classification
- Kingdom: Fungi
- Division: Ascomycota
- Class: Lecanoromycetes
- Order: Peltigerales
- Family: Collemataceae
- Genus: Scytinium
- Species: S. tetrasporum

Binomial name
- Scytinium tetrasporum (Th.Fr.) Otálora, P.M.Jørg. & Wedin (2014)

Synonyms
- Leptogium tetrasporum Th.Fr. (1865)

Species of lichen-forming fungus

Scytinium tetrasporum is a species of lichen-forming fungus in the family Collemataceae. Found in Europe, it was described as a new species in 1865.

== Taxonomy ==
Leptogium tetrasporum was introduced as a new species in 1865 by the Swedish lichenlogist Theodor Magnus Fries. The type specimen is from Hälsingland, Sweden (Bjuråker parish, Stråsjö), based on material collected by J.A. Hartman. The species epithet refers to the unusual spore count: each ascus bears four ascospores rather than the eight typical of Leptogium. In the protologue the author compared it with Nylander's L. humosum (now Scytinium tenuissimum) but treated it as distinct on several points, including a strongly cellular cortex, a colourless hypothecium, hyaline (colourless and translucent) paraphyses with tawny tips, somewhat cylindrical to slightly club-shaped asci, and a hymenial gel that stains deep blue in iodine.

Mónica Otálora, Per Magnus Jørgensen, and Mats Wedin reclassified the species in genus Scytinium in 2014.

== Description ==
The thallus is closely attached to the substrate (adnate) and built of small, warty to lobulate granular patches (areoles) that are dark brown to almost black. Apothecia (fruiting bodies) are rather small, the same colour as the thallus, and remain distinctly concave. The algal partner (photobiont) occurs in bead-like chains, and the tissue beneath the hymenium (the hypothecium) is colourless. Sterile filaments interspersed between the spore sacs (paraphyses) are clear with tawny tips. Asci are somewhat cylindrical and inflated, producing four large, oblong ascospores that are muriform—divided by several transverse and longitudinal septa—with three more strongly marked cross-walls. The spores are constricted at the septa and blunt at both ends, measuring 22–34 × 10–16 μm. The hymenial gel stains an intense blue with iodine. Asexual propagules (conidia) are linear, straight or very slightly curved, about 3–4 μm long and roughly four times longer than wide.
