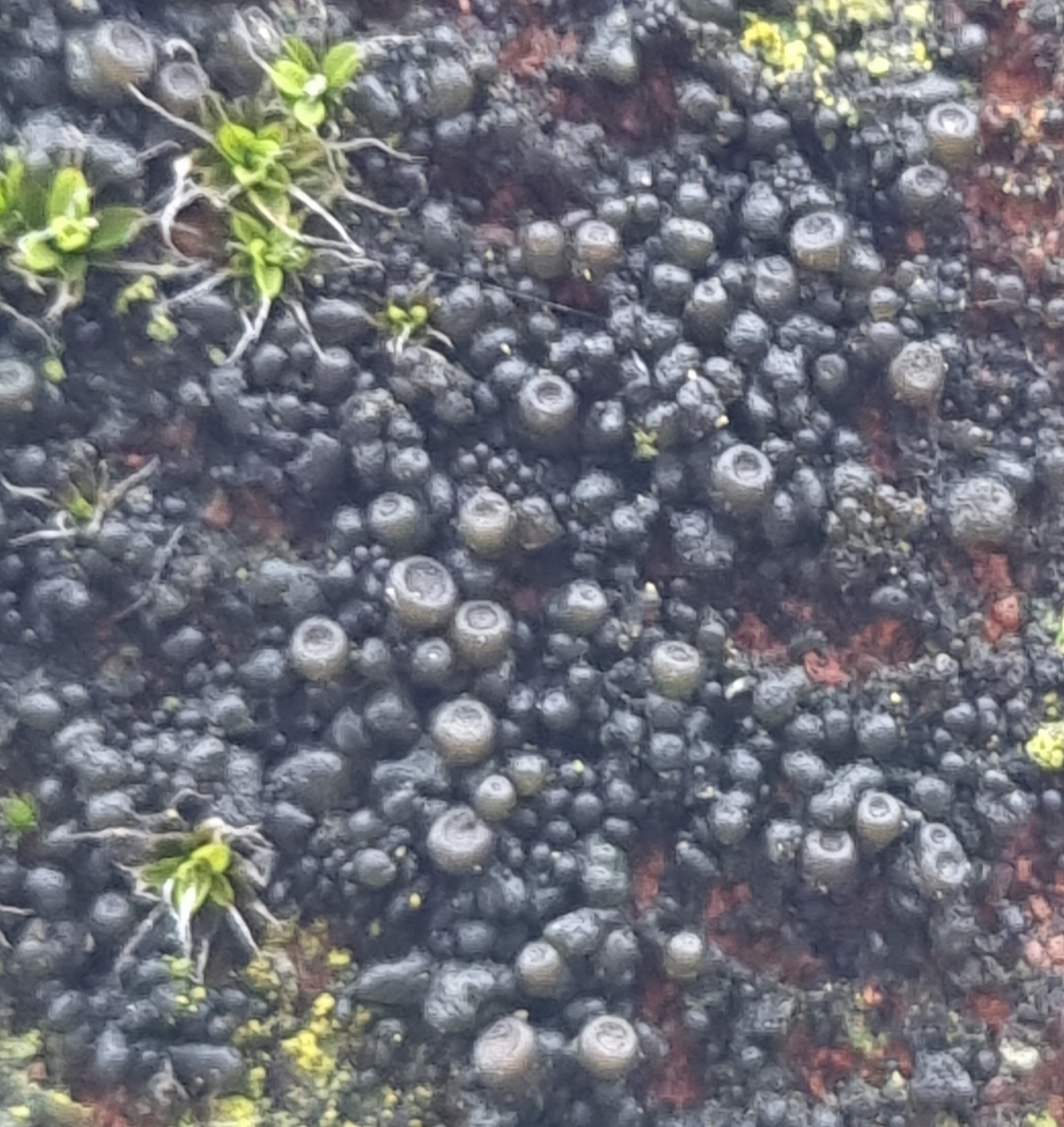

Scientific classification
- Kingdom: Fungi
- Division: Ascomycota
- Class: Lecanoromycetes
- Order: Peltigerales
- Family: Collemataceae
- Genus: Scytinium
- Species: S. turgidum

Binomial name
- Scytinium turgidum (Ach.) Otálora, P.M.Jørg. & Wedin (2013)

Synonyms
- List: Collema turgidum Ach. (1810); Collema pulposum var. turgidum (Ach.) Linds. (1859); Collemodium turgidum (Ach.) Nyl. (1880); Collemodium turgidum var. turgidum (Ach.) Nyl. (1880); Enchylium turgidum (Ach.) Gray (1821); Leptogium plicatile var. turgidum (Ach.) H.Olivier (1903); Leptogium turgidum (Ach.) Cromb. (1871); Leptogium turgidum f. turgidum (Ach.) Cromb. (1871); Leptogium turgidum var. turgidum (Ach.) Cromb. (1871); Lichen furvus (Ach.) Lam. (1813); Parmelia turgida (Ach.) Schaer. (1842)

= Scytinium turgidum =

Species of lichen-forming fungus

Scytinium turgidum is a species of lichen-forming fungus in the family Collemataceae.

== Taxonomy ==
The lichen was first formally described in 1810 by Erik Acharius as Collema turgidum, based on material from England sent to him by Dawson Turner; in the protologue, he described it as a thick, gelatinous species with an irregularly spreading, folded thallus studded with small wart-like lobules and bearing urn-shaped fruiting bodies (apothecia) with a swollen, slightly inturned margin. Acharius distinguished it from C. pulposum, C. fluviatile, and C. plicatile by its distinctive overall form and the shape of its apothecia. James Mascall Morrison Crombie transferred it to Leptogium in 1871, and it was largely known as a member of this genus for more than a century. In 2013, it was reclassified to Scytinium as part of a molecular phylogenetics-informed structural reorganization of the family Collemataceae.

== Description ==
The thallus of Scytinium turgidum is fairly thick and lobed, with small lobes usually 0.2–1 mm wide and up to 2.5 mm long. These lobes are swollen, and may sometimes rise above the substrate surface, giving parts of the thallus a somewhat shrubby appearance. The upper surface is dark olive-black to reddish black, with a wrinkled to folded texture, and is concave around the margins. It is often densely covered with granular isidia measuring 60–100 μm in diameter. The thallus has a distinct cortex made of angular cells, while the medulla is compact and composed throughout of broad, short-celled hyphae. Apothecia, when present, range from 0.5 to 3 mm in diameter. Their disc is at first concave, later becoming more or less flat, and the thalline margin is swollen, entire, or sometimes slightly granular.

== Habitat ==
Scytinium turgidum grows on calcareous (calcium-rich) walls, particularly on friable mortar, as well as on calcareous soils.
