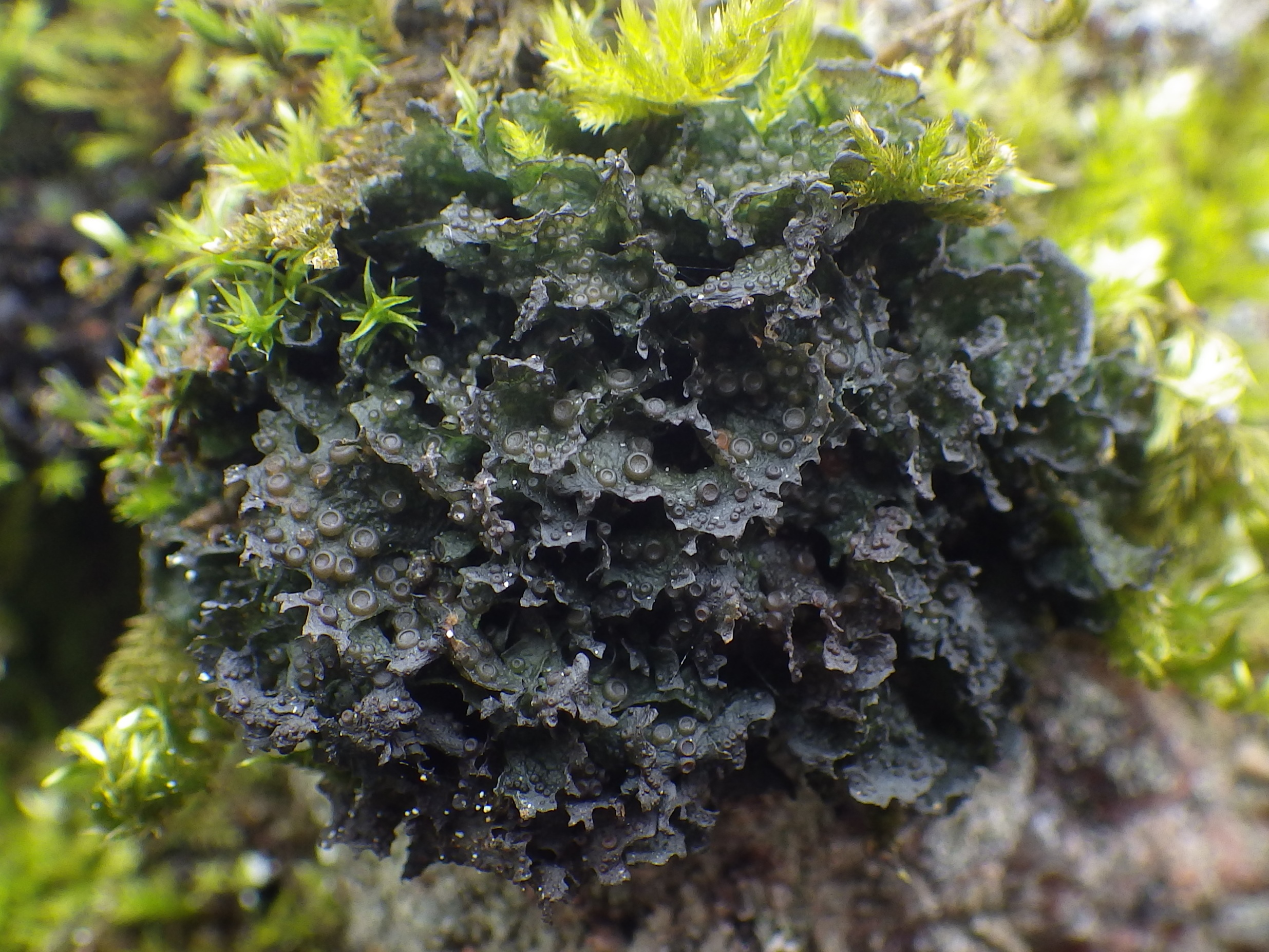
- Scytinium gelatinosum

Scientific classification
- Kingdom: Fungi
- Division: Ascomycota
- Class: Lecanoromycetes
- Order: Peltigerales
- Family: Collemataceae
- Genus: Scytinium (Ach.) Gray (1821)

Type species
- Scytenium palmatum (Huds.) Gray (1821)

Synonyms
- Collema ††† Scytinium Ach. (1810); Collema sect. Scytenium (Ach.) Bory (1823); Collema sect. Scytinium (Ach.) W.Mann (1825)

= Scytinium =

Genus of lichen-forming fungi

Scytinium is a genus of lichen-forming fungi in the family Collemataceae. It has 49 species. These lichens are typically found on basic rocks, soil, and trees, occasionally in association with mosses. In its revised sense, Scytinium includes crustose, squamulose or small foliose jelly-lichens with thalli (lichen bodies) usually only a few millimetres to a few centimetres across. Despite the morphological and ecological diversity within Scytinium, its species share similar ascospore features, such as shape and septation, as well as a small to medium-sized thallus with at least a partial cortex.

== Taxonomy ==
Scytinium was first treated by Erik Acharius (1810) as a section within Collema, and was raised to generic rank by Samuel Gray (1821). The name was later stabilised by designating Scytinium palmatum (≡ Lichen palmatus Huds.) as lectotype; Gray's alternative spelling "Scytenium" is an orthographic variant to be corrected. Two 19th–20th-century segregate names, Collemodium and Homodium, have been lectotypified and brought into synonymy with Scytinium in this modern sense.

A broad molecular reassessment of the jelly-lichens (Collemataceae) showed that the long-used genera Collema and Leptogium are not each monophyletic. Using four DNA markers, the authors recovered ten well-supported lineages and converted them into genera. In practical terms, they re-circumscribed Leptogium for the large, strongly corticate species, kept Collema for the non-corticate large foliose species, and resurrected Scytinium for a mainly small- to medium-sized assemblage that had been split between Leptogium and Collema. The key character "eucortex" (a true upper or lower cortical layer) was shown to have evolved several times, so it cannot by itself define genera. The resulting taxonomy moved a large number of names: the authors explicitly transferred 44 species into Scytinium from Leptogium and Collema, and listed an additional resurrected name.

In its revised sense, Scytinium includes crustose, squamulose or small foliose jelly-lichens with thalli (lichen bodies) usually only a few millimetres to a few centimetres across. Many species have a cortex or a thin pseudocortex (an irregular surface layer), and all share relatively small, muriform spores—i.e., spores divided by both cross-walls and lengthwise walls so they look brick-like under the microscope. As emphasised by the authors, eucorticate Scytinium species can resemble Leptogium, but Leptogium tends to have much larger thalli and lobes and is chiefly epiphytic in wet regions, whereas Scytinium is often bryophilous, terricolous or saxicolous and centred in temperate zones.

== Description ==
Scytinium encompasses lichen species that exhibit a variety of thallus forms, such as crustose, squamulose, minutely foliose, or minutely shrubby. These lichens have a gelatinous texture, and their colour ranges from dark brown and bluish-grey to olive-green. The lobes of Scytinium can be spreading, elongate, or somewhat cylindrical in shape. The upper and lower cortex, when present, is composed of either cuboid cells or flattened, degraded tissue. The medulla contains loosely interwoven or compact hyphae, along with the photobiont Nostoc–a common genus of cyanobacteria.

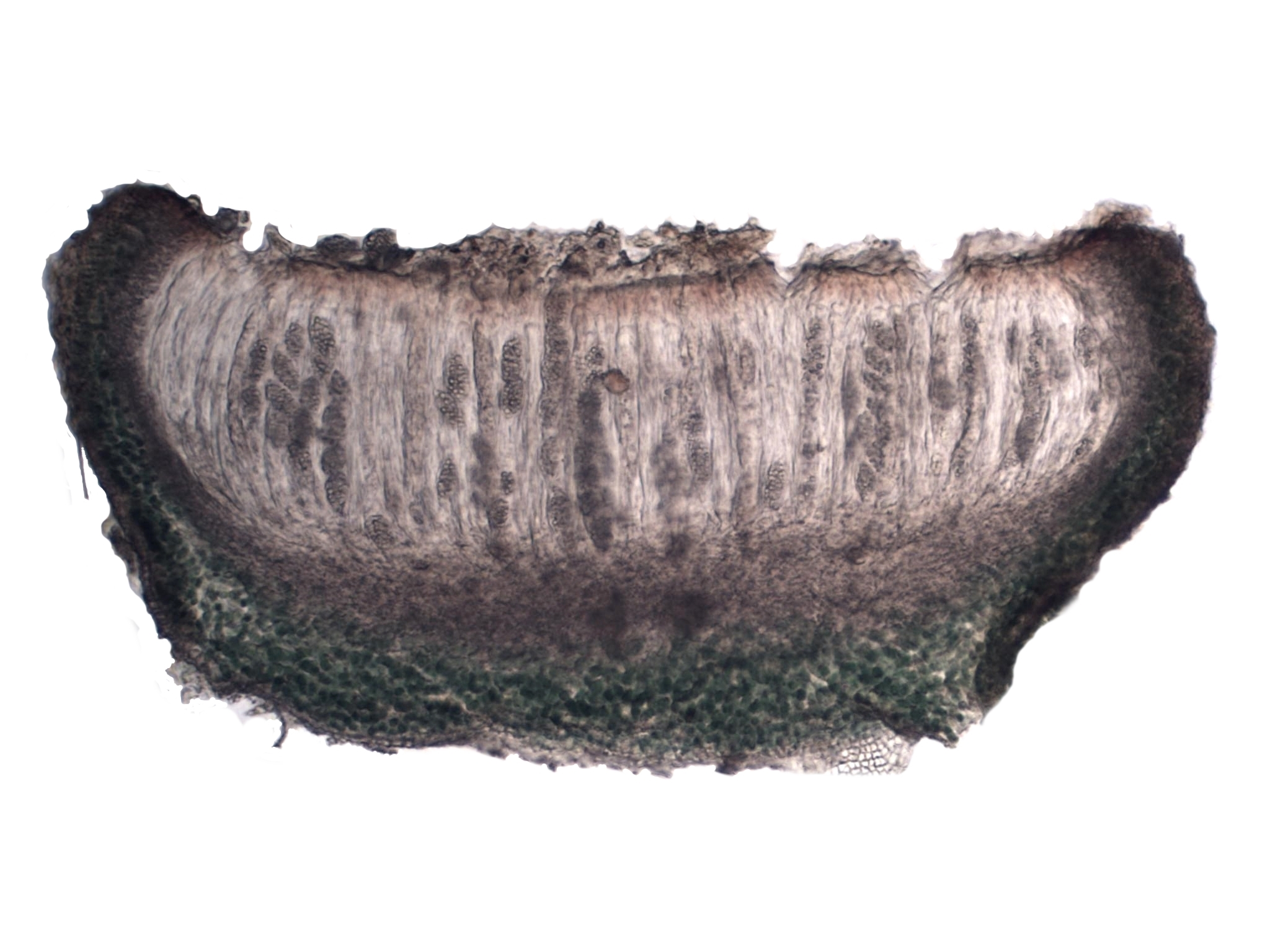
An apothecial section of Scytinium gelatinosum shows some characteristics of the genus: a raised, red-brown, cup-shaped true exciple; a red-brown, concave disc; and ellipsoid, muriform ascospores

Both the upper and lower surfaces of Scytinium lichens can vary from smooth to wrinkled or ridged and typically exhibit a matte appearance. While isidia may or may not be present, soredia are absent in this genus. The photobiont cells are generally arranged in distinct chains. The ascomata are in the form of apothecia with a red-brown disc, which can be sessile, laminal, or marginal. The thalline margin is smooth to granulose, isidiate to lobulate, and often persistent. The true exciple is raised, cup-shaped, and predominantly composed of isodiametric cells, ranging in colour from colourless to reddish-brown. The disc is either concave or flat.

The epithecium is colourless to reddish-brown and does not react with a solution of potassium hydroxide or ammonia. The hymenium is colourless, turning blue when exposed to iodine. The hypothecium is shallow, and its colour varies from colourless to pale yellowish. The hamathecium consists of numerous, conglutinate paraphyses that separate in potassium hydroxide and sometimes have branched apices that are somewhat swollen. The asci contain eight spores and are club-shaped (clavate), with a strongly thickened apex that reacts to potassium hydroxide and iodine, turning blue. Ascospores are primarily ellipsoidal, muriform, and colourless, lacking any distinct surface ornamentation or perispore. Conidiomata, or pycnidia, are infrequent in Scytinium species. No lichen products have been detected in Scytinium species using thin-layer chromatography.

== Species ==
As of December 2024, Species Fungorum (in the Catalogue of Life) accepts 48 species of Scytinium.

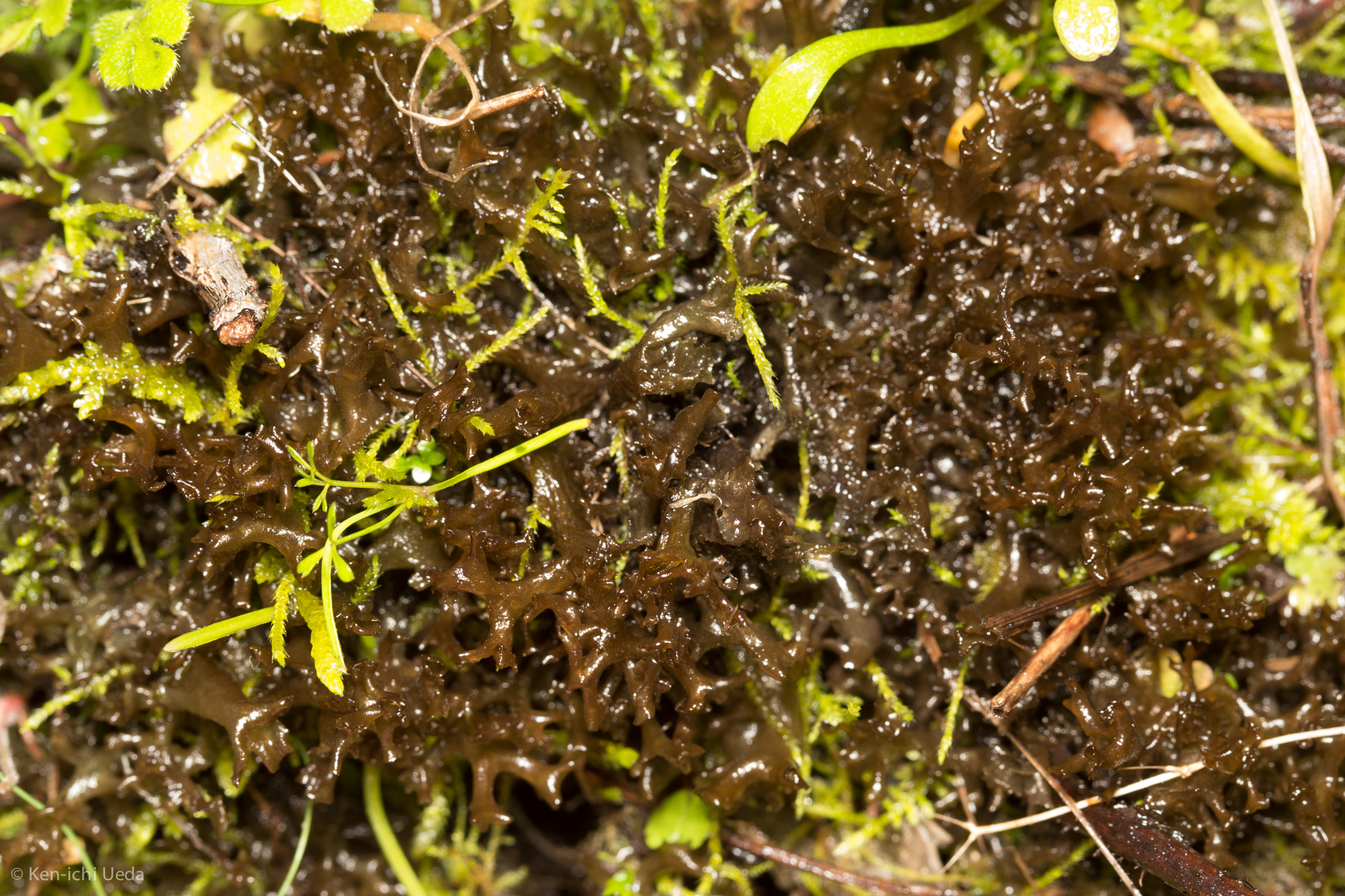
Scytinium palmatum

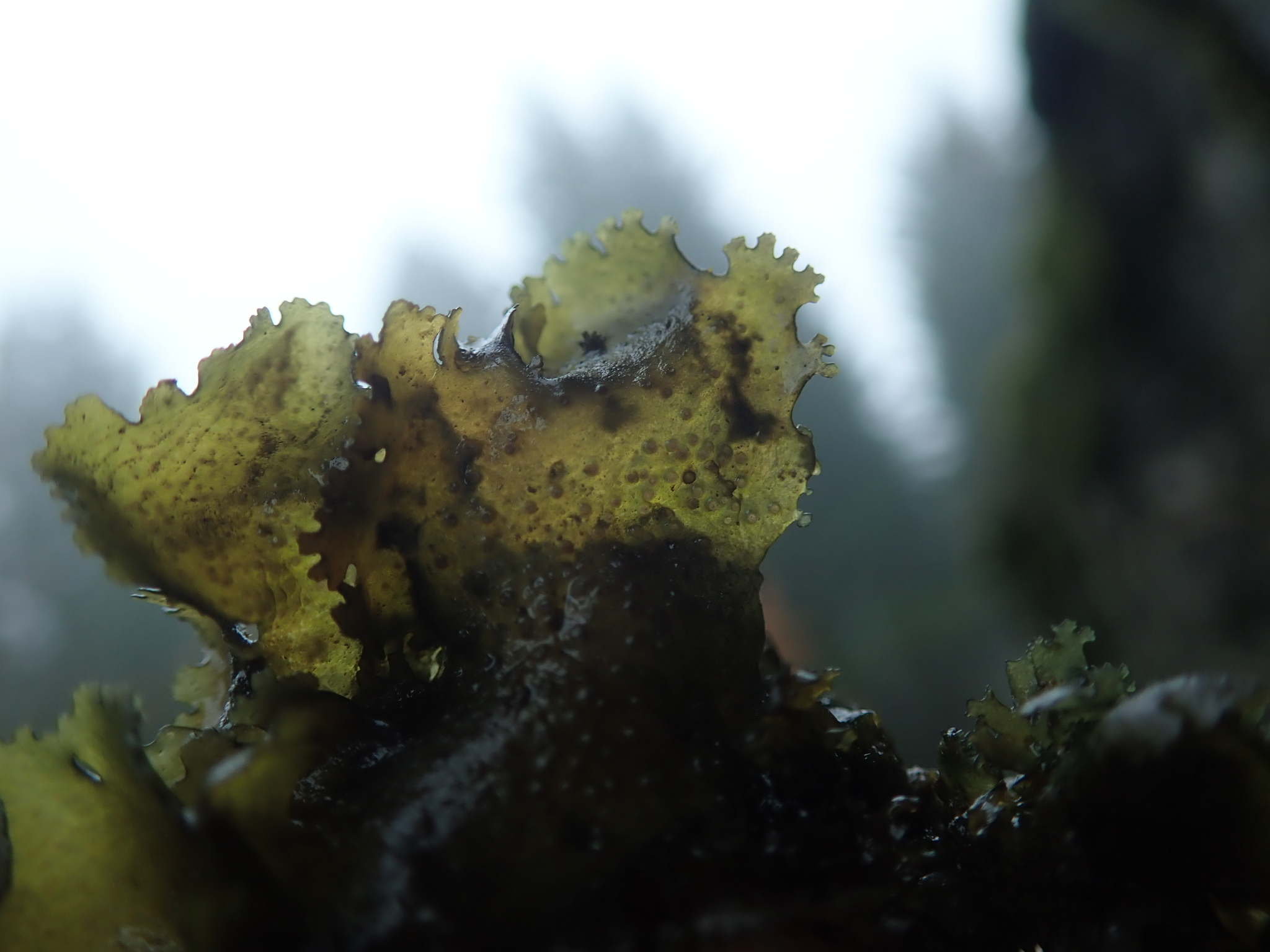
Scytinium platynum

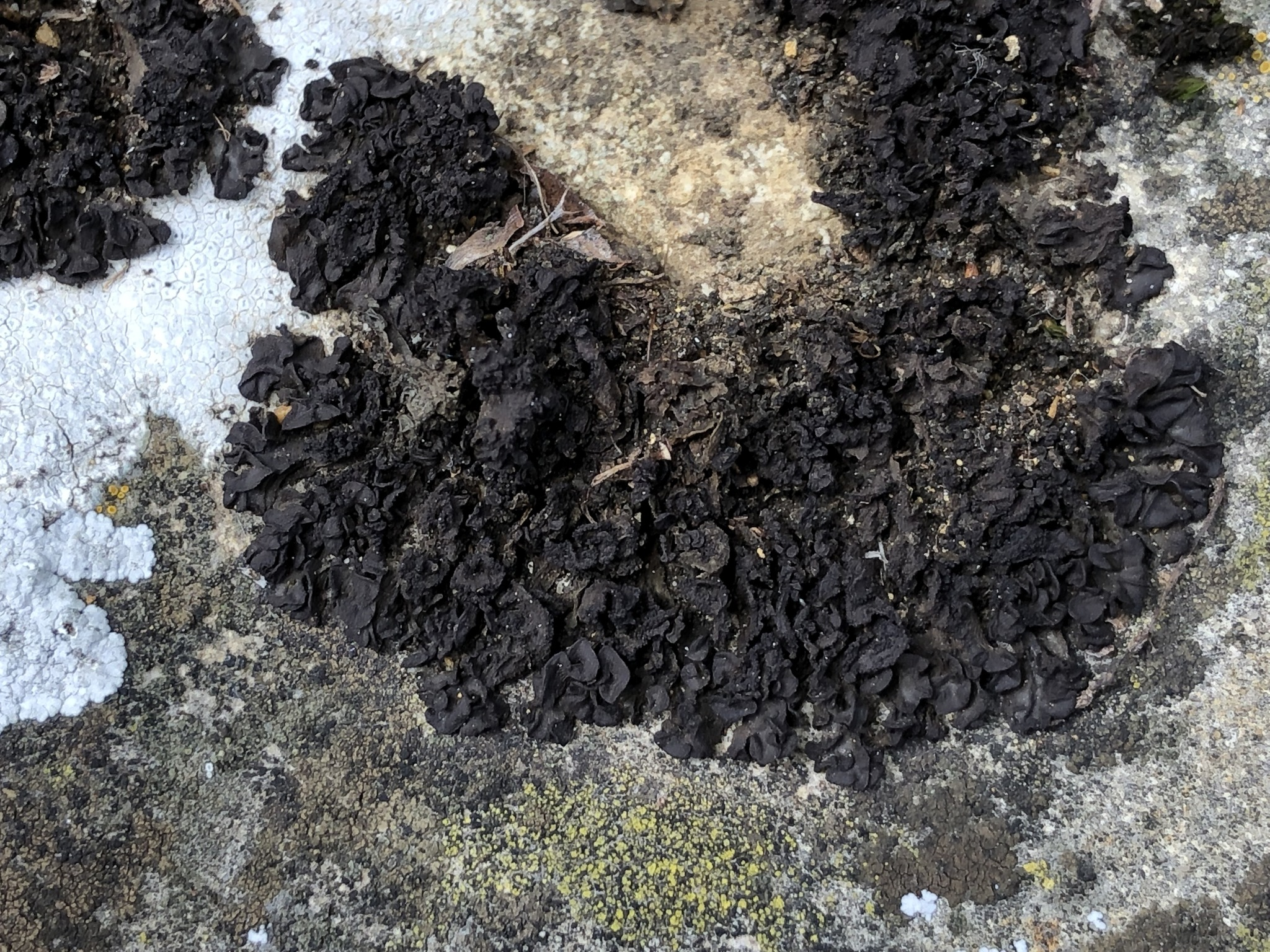
Scytinium plicatile

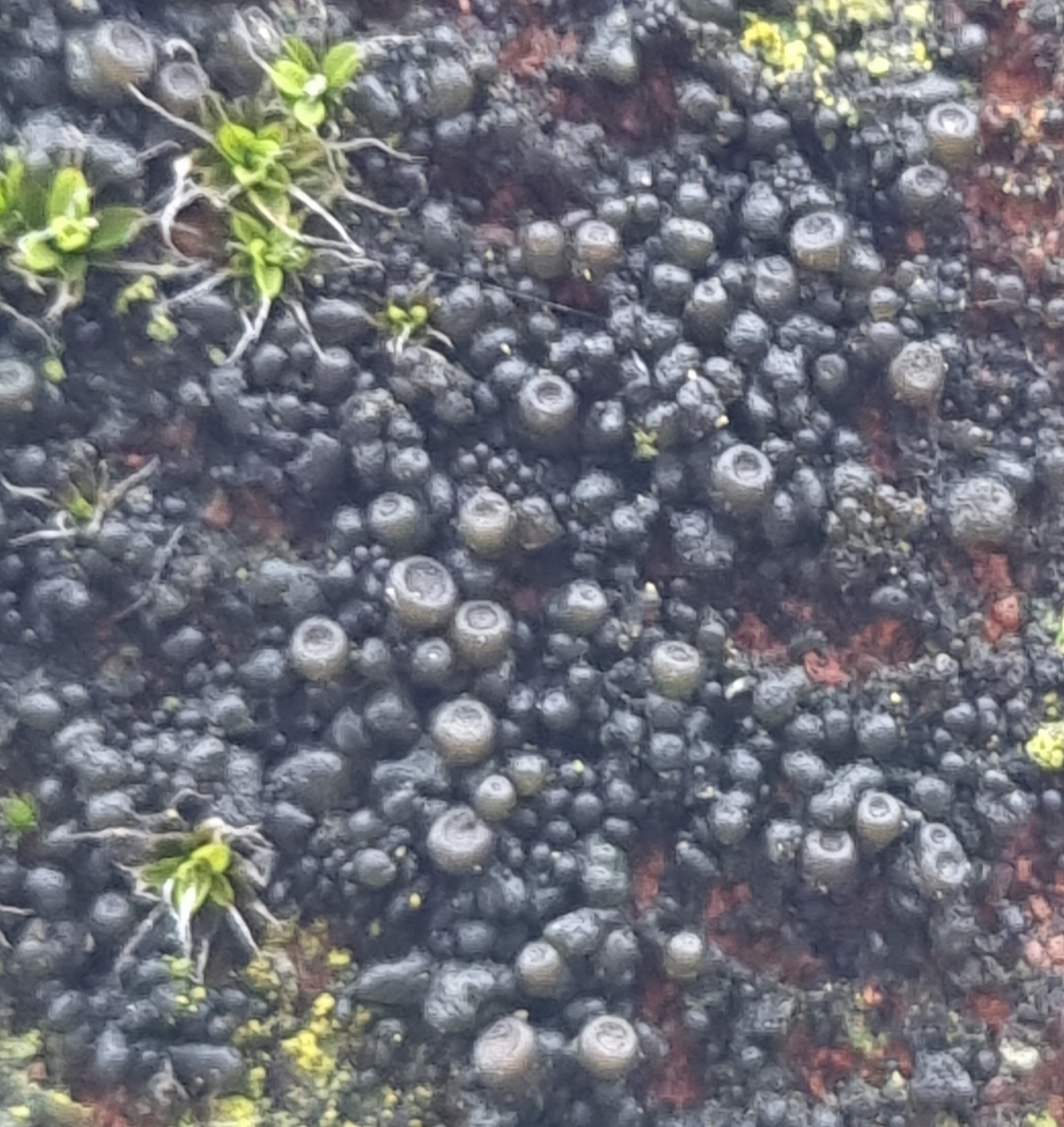
Scytinium turgidum

- Scytinium apalachense (Tuck.) Otálora, P.M.Jørg. & Wedin (2013)
- Scytinium aquale (Arnold) Otálora, P.M.Jørg. & Wedin (2013)
- Scytinium aragonii (Otálora) Otálora, P.M.Jørg. & Wedin (2013)
- Scytinium biatorinum (Nyl.) Otálora, P.M.Jørg. & Wedin (2013)
- Scytinium bosoense (H.Harada) Otálora, P.M.Jørg. & Wedin (2013)
- Scytinium californicum (Tuck.) Otálora, P.M.Jørg. & Wedin (2013)
- Scytinium callopismum (A.Massal.) Otálora, P.M.Jørg. & Wedin (2013)
- Scytinium cellulosum (P.M.Jørg. & Tønsberg) Otálora, P.M.Jørg. & Wedin (2013)
- Scytinium chibaense (H.Harada) Otálora, P.M.Jørg. & Wedin (2013)
- Scytinium contortum (Sierk) Otálora, P.M.Jørg. & Wedin (2013)
- Scytinium dactylinum (Tuck.) Otálora, P.M.Jørg. & Wedin (2013)
- Scytinium erectum (Sierk) Otálora, P.M.Jørg. & Wedin (2013)
- Scytinium euthallinum (Zahlbr.) Otálora, P.M.Jørg. & Wedin (2013)
- Scytinium ferax (Durieu & Mont.) Otálora, P.M.Jørg. & Wedin (2013)
- Scytinium fragile (Taylor) Otálora, P.M.Jørg. & Wedin (2013)
- Scytinium fragrans (Sm.) Otálora, P.M.Jørg. & Wedin (2013)
- Scytinium gelatinosum (With.) Otálora, P.M.Jørg. & Wedin (2013)
- Scytinium imbricatum (P.M.Jørg.) Otálora, P.M.Jørg. & Wedin (2013)
- Scytinium intermedium (Arnold) Otálora, P.M.Jørg. & Wedin (2013)
- Scytinium juniperinum (Tuck.) Otálora, P.M.Jørg. & Wedin (2013)
- Scytinium kauaiense (H.Magn.) Otálora, P.M.Jørg. & Wedin (2013)
- Scytinium leptogioides (Anzi) Otálora, P.M.Jørg. & Wedin (2013)
- Scytinium lichenoides (L.) Otálora, P.M.Jørg. & Wedin (2013)
- Scytinium magnussonii (Degel. & P.M.Jørg.) Otálora, P.M.Jørg. & Wedin (2013)
- Scytinium massiliense (Nyl.) Otálora, P.M.Jørg. & Wedin (2013)
- Scytinium nanum (Herre) D.F.Stone & McCune (2022)
- Scytinium palmatum (Huds.) Gray (1821)
- Scytinium palustre (P.M.Jørg.) Otálora, P.M.Jørg. & Wedin (2013)
- Scytinium parculum (Nyl.) Otálora, P.M.Jørg. & Wedin (2013)
- Scytinium parvum (Tuck.) Otálora, P.M.Jørg. & Wedin (2013)
- Scytinium plicatile (Ach.) Otálora, P.M.Jørg. & Wedin (2013)
- Scytinium polycarpum (P.M.Jørg. & Goward) Otálora, P.M.Jørg. & Wedin (2013)
- Scytinium pulvinatum (Hoffm.) P.M.Jørg. & Wedin (2014)
- Scytinium quadrifidum (D.F.Stone & McCune) A. Košuth. & Wedin (2019)
- Scytinium rivale (Tuck.) Otálora, P.M.Jørg. & Wedin (2013)
- Scytinium rogersii (Verdon) Otálora, P.M.Jørg. & Wedin (2013)
- Scytinium schraderi (Ach.) Otálora, P.M.Jørg. & Wedin (2013)
- Scytinium singulare Carlberg & P.M.Jørg. (2016)
- Scytinium siskiyouense (D.F.Stone & Ruchty) Otálora, P.M.Jørg. & Wedin (2013)
- Scytinium subaridum (P.M.Jørg. & Goward) Otálora, P.M.Jørg. & Wedin (2013)
- Scytinium subfragrans (Degel.) Otálora, P.M.Jørg. & Wedin (2013)
- Scytinium subtile (Schrad.) Otálora, P.M.Jørg. & Wedin (2013)
- Scytinium subtorulosum (Nyl. ex Stizenb.) Otálora, P.M.Jørg. & Wedin (2013)
- Scytinium tacomae (P.M.Jørg. & Tønsberg) McCune (2014)
- Scytinium tenuilobum P.M.McCarthy (2017) – Australia
- Scytinium tenuissimum (Hoffm.) Otálora, P.M.Jørg. & Wedin (2013)
- Scytinium tetrasporum (Th.Fr.) Otálora, P.M.Jørg. & Wedin (2013)
- Scytinium turgidum (Ach.) Otálora, P.M.Jørg. & Wedin (2013)
