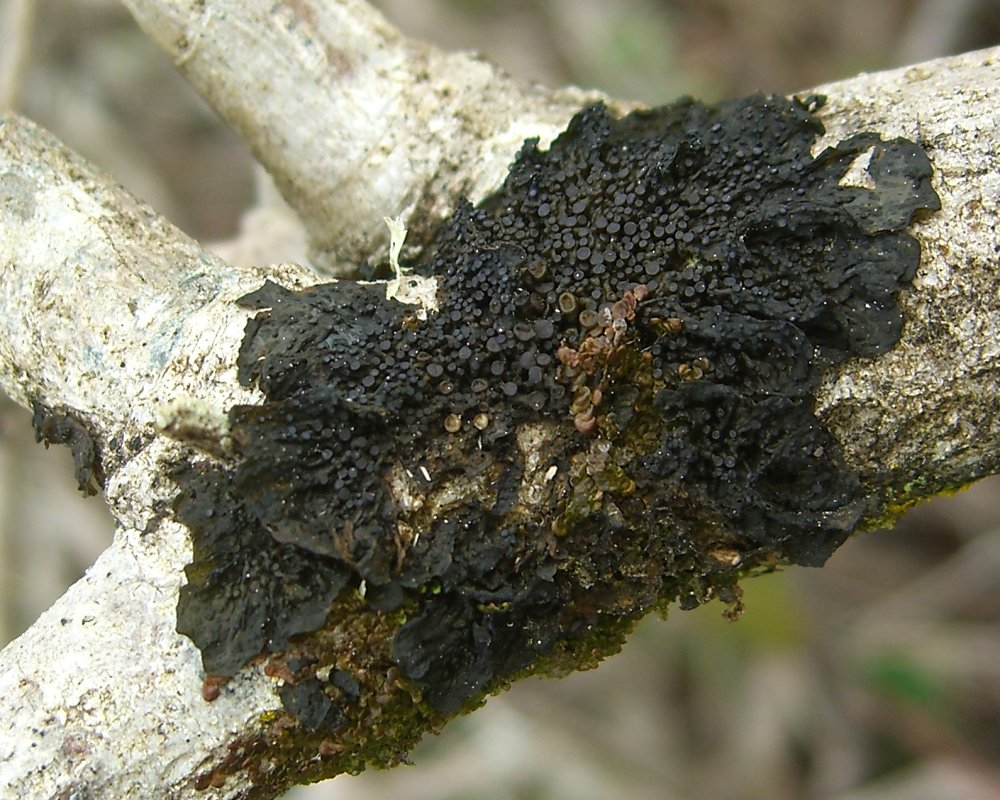
- in Northwestern California

Conservation status
- Secure (NatureServe)

Scientific classification
- Kingdom: Fungi
- Division: Ascomycota
- Class: Lecanoromycetes
- Order: Peltigerales
- Family: Collemataceae
- Genus: Collema
- Species: C. nigrescens

Binomial name
- Collema nigrescens (Huds.) DC. (1805)

Synonyms
- Lichen nigrescens Huds. (1762)

= Collema nigrescens =

Species of lichen

Collema nigrescens is a leafy (foliose) jelly lichen (Collema genus) found growing on the bark of trees such as bigleaf maples, in wetter coastal parts of California. It is commonly called button jelly lichen or bat's wing lichen. It is blackish-green when wet, and dark brownish-green to dark olive when dry. The photosynthetic partner is the Nostoc cyanobacterium that is spread throughout the thallus (main body part). Although foliose in form, like all jelly lichens, the thallus is not differentiated, lacking layers or an upper or lower cortex (lichen) and the cyanobacteria is spread throughout the thallus. It has dark purple-brown apothecia all over. It produces no reaction to lichen spot tests.
