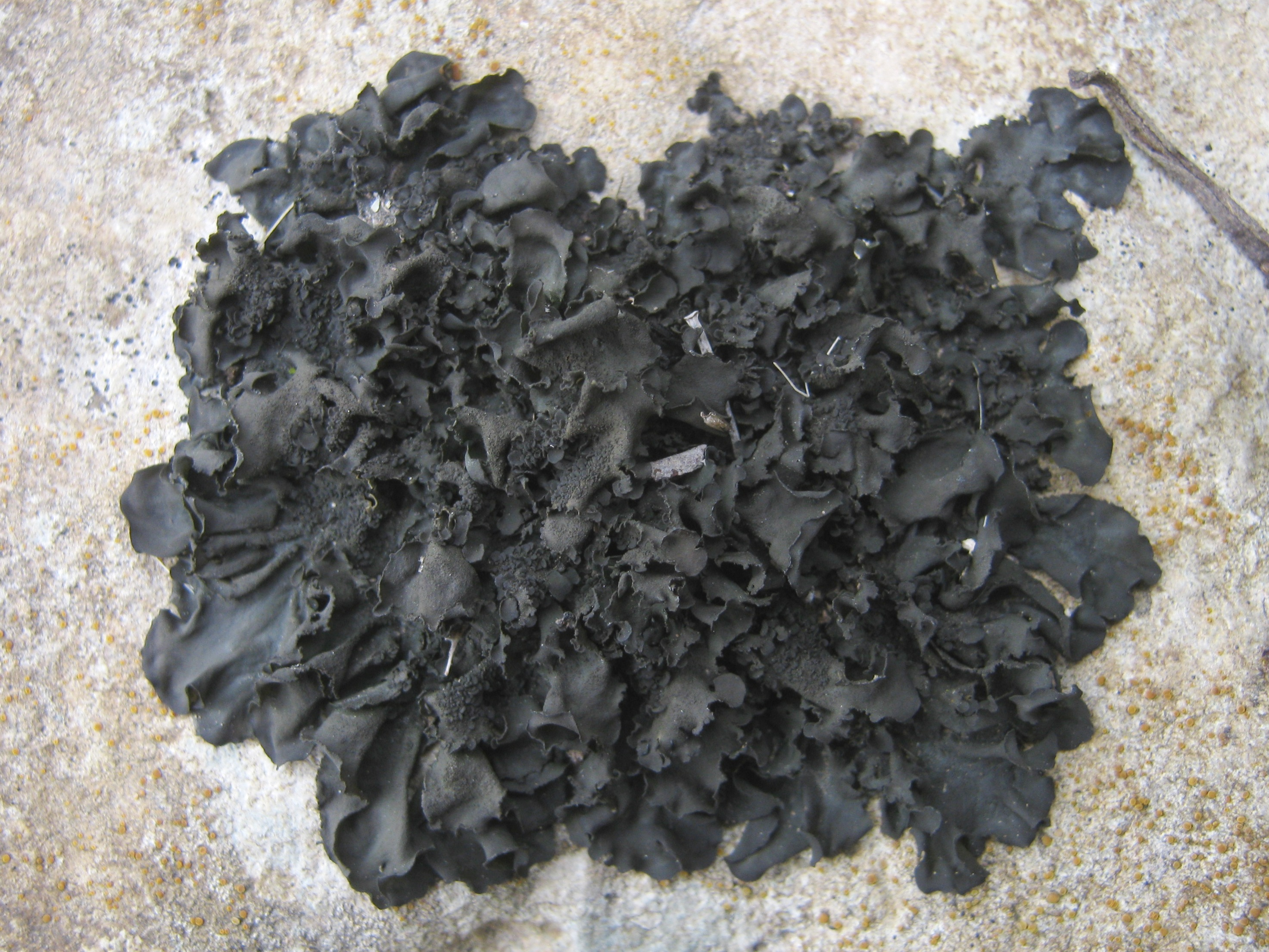

Conservation status
- Apparently Secure (NatureServe)

Scientific classification
- Kingdom: Fungi
- Division: Ascomycota
- Class: Lecanoromycetes
- Order: Peltigerales
- Family: Collemataceae
- Genus: Collema
- Species: C. flaccidum

Binomial name
- Collema flaccidum (Ach.) Ach. (1810)

Synonyms
- Lichen flaccidus Ach. (1795)

= Collema flaccidum =

Species of lichen

Collema flaccidum is a species of lichen belonging to the family Collemataceae.
