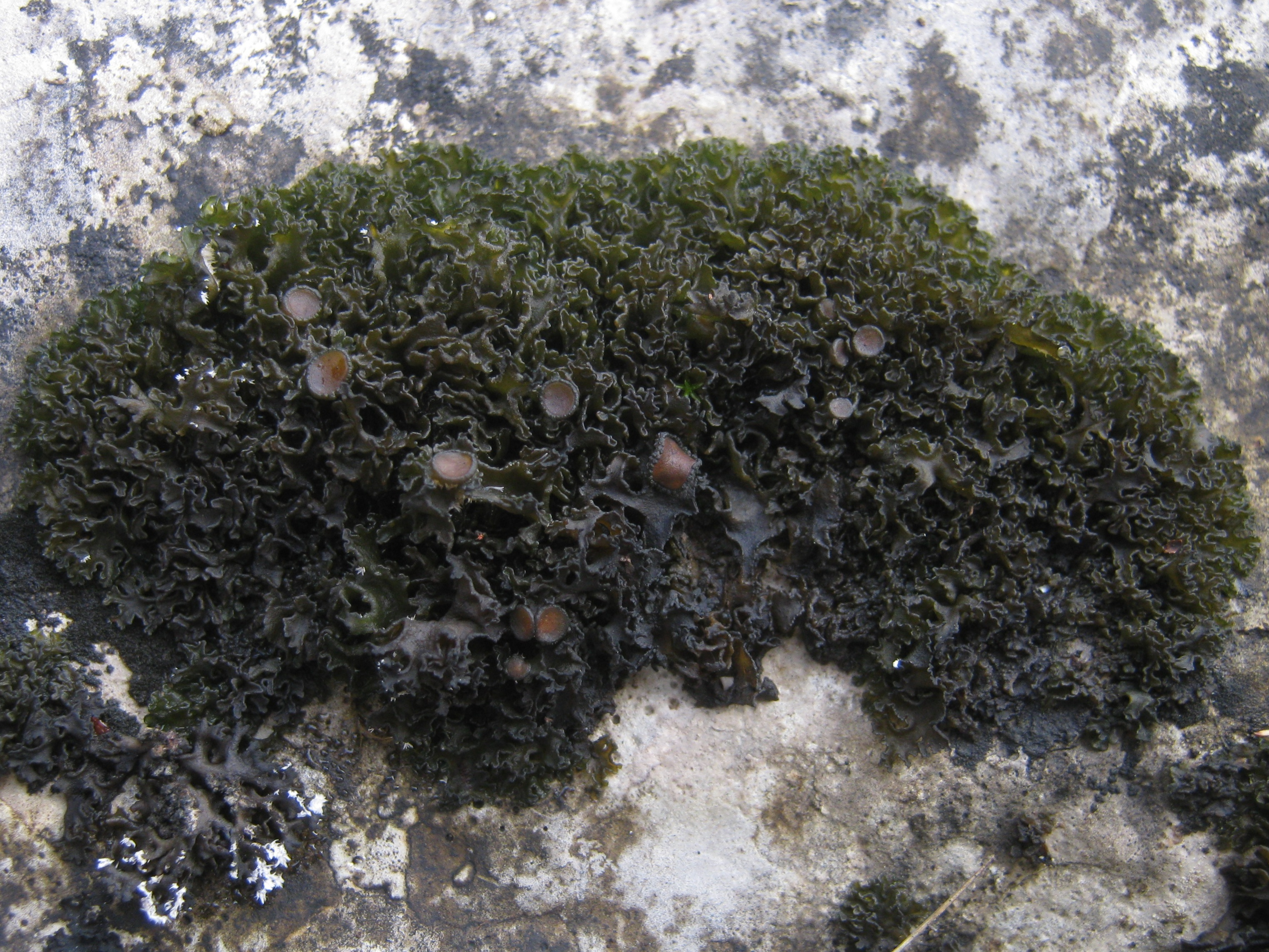
- In Serra de Montejunto, Portugal

Scientific classification
- Kingdom: Fungi
- Division: Ascomycota
- Class: Lecanoromycetes
- Order: Peltigerales
- Family: Collemataceae
- Genus: Lathagrium
- Species: L. cristatum

Binomial name
- Lathagrium cristatum (L.) Otálora, P.M.Jørg. & Wedin (2013)

Synonyms
- List: Lichen cristatus L. (1753); Collema cristatum (L.) F.H.Wigg. (1780); Parmelia crispa var. cristata (L.) Ach. (1803); Collema pulposum var. cristatum (L.) Ach. (1810); Collema crispum f. cristatum (L.) Ach. (1814); Collema crispum var. cristatum (L.) Ach. (1814); Collema crispum C cristatus (L.) Mérat (1821); Parmelia multifida var. cristata (L.) Schaer. (1842); Collema multifidum var. cristatum (L.) Rabenh. (1845); Collema auriculatum var. cristatum (L.) Flot. (1850); Collema melaenum var. cristatum (L.) Linds. (1859); Collema melaenum f. cristatum (L.) Nyl. (1859); Eucollema cristatum (L.) Horw. (1912); Lichen gyrosus Oeder (1769); Lichen gyrosus Gunnerus (1772); Parmelia melaena var. gyrosa (Gunnerus) Ach. (1803); Collema melaenum var. gyrosum (Gunnerus) Ach. (1810); Lichen jacobaeifolius * gyrosum (Gunnerus) Lam. (1813); Collema gyrosum (Gunnerus) Röhl. (1813); Collema melaenum f. gyrosum (Gunnerus) Ach. (1814); Eucollema melaenum f. gyrosum (Gunnerus) Horw. (1912); Collema multifidum var. gyrosum (Gunnerus) A.L.Sm. (1918); Collema multifidum f. gyrosum (Gunnerus) A.L.Sm. (1924); Collema pulposum P.Gaertn. (1802); Collema complicatum Fr. (1825); Parmelia multifida var. complicata (Fr.) Schaer. (1842); Synechoblastus complicatus (Fr.) Mudd (1861); Collema melaenum var. complicatum (Fr.) Leight. (1871); Collema granuliferum Nyl. (1875); Collema cristatum var. granuliferum (Nyl.) Harm. (1895); Collema cristatum f. granuliferum (Nyl.) Harm. (1895); Collema multifidum var. granuliferum (Nyl.) Boistel (1903); Eucollema granuliferum (Nyl.) Horw. (1912); Collema hypergenum Nyl. (1876); Collema melaenum subsp. hypergenum (Nyl.) Cromb. (1894); Collema multifidum f. hypergenum (Nyl.) Boistel (1903); Eucollema hypergenum (Nyl.) Horw. (1912); Collema granuliferum f. minus Cromb. ex Leight. (1879)

= Lathagrium cristatum =

Species of lichen-forming fungus

Lathagrium cristatum, the fingered jelly lichen or fingered rock-jelly, is a species of cyanolichen in the family Collemataceae. Originally described by Carl Linnaeus in 1753, the species has a complex taxonomic history involving numerous synonyms and nomenclatural challenges that were only resolved through formal conservation of the name in 1996. The lichen forms distinctive dark olive-green to blackish rosettes on calcareous rocks, with thin, narrow lobes that have characteristically wavy, toothed margins. It has a widespread distribution across the Northern Hemisphere, occurring in diverse climates from arid lowland deserts to arctic and alpine zones. Like other members of its family, it contains cyanobacteria as its photosynthetic partner, enabling it to fix atmospheric nitrogen. The species typically grows in undisturbed natural habitats on hard limestone or dolomite, often in exposed sites moistened by rain runoff.

== Taxonomy ==
Lathagrium cristatum was originally described by the Swedish taxonomist Carl Linnaeus as Lichen cristatus in his 1753 work Species Plantarum. His protologue provided a new diagnostic phrase-name based entirely on Johann Jacob Dillenius's Historia muscorum, the only work cited, because Linnaeus himself had never seen the species in Sweden. No original specimens exist in the Linnaean Herbarium, and the only original material traceable to the protologue is the Dillenian plate (tab. XIX, fig. 26) and the specimen in Dillenius's herbarium that it depicts.

Later authors interpreted Linnaeus's name for material corresponding to the common jelly lichen now known as Collema tenax. In 1954, Gunnar Degelius selected an Italian collection from Pocol, near Cortina d'Ampezzo, as a neotype, as it matched the prevailing application of the name. Subsequent study showed, however, that Dillenius's illustration constitutes original material under the nomenclatural Code and therefore has priority over any neotype. Because the Dillenian specimen represents Collema tenax, strict lectotypification using that illustration would have forced a disruptive name change.

To maintain the long-established usage of the name, Per Magnus Jørgensen and colleagues (1994) proposed that Lichen cristatus be conserved with Degelius's Pocol collection as the conserved type, rather than with the original Dillenian material. This proposal was accepted unanimously by the Nomenclature Committee for Fungi and later ratified (1996), alongside other Linnaean lichen names requiring stabilisation. Under the conserved type, the name applies to the species traditionally known as Collema cristatum and now placed in Lathagrium.

Over the following two centuries the name Lichen cristatus accumulated a large and complex synonymy. Early authors placed Linnaeus's species in a succession of broadly defined foliose or gelatinous lichen genera, producing combinations under Parmelia, Collema, Eucollema, and several short-lived segregate genera. Many of these were merely formal adjustments reflecting shifting generic concepts rather than attempts to describe distinct taxa; others represent minor forms and varieties later recognised as morphological expressions of a single, highly variable species. Parallel names such as Lichen gyrosus and Collema complicatum added further complication until they, too, were drawn into the synonymy. By the early twentieth century virtually all of this material had been united under Collema cristatum in an expanded circumscription of Collema. Using a four-locus molecular phylogeny of the Collemataceae, Otálora, Jørgensen and Wedin showed that the cristatum group forms a distinct, well-supported clade of rock-dwelling jelly lichens separate from Collema in the strict sense. In their resulting revised generic classification they resurrected the generic name Lathagrium for this lineage and made the new combination Lathagrium cristatum.

In North America, the species is commonly known as the "fingered jelly lichen" or the "fingered rock-jelly".

== Description ==
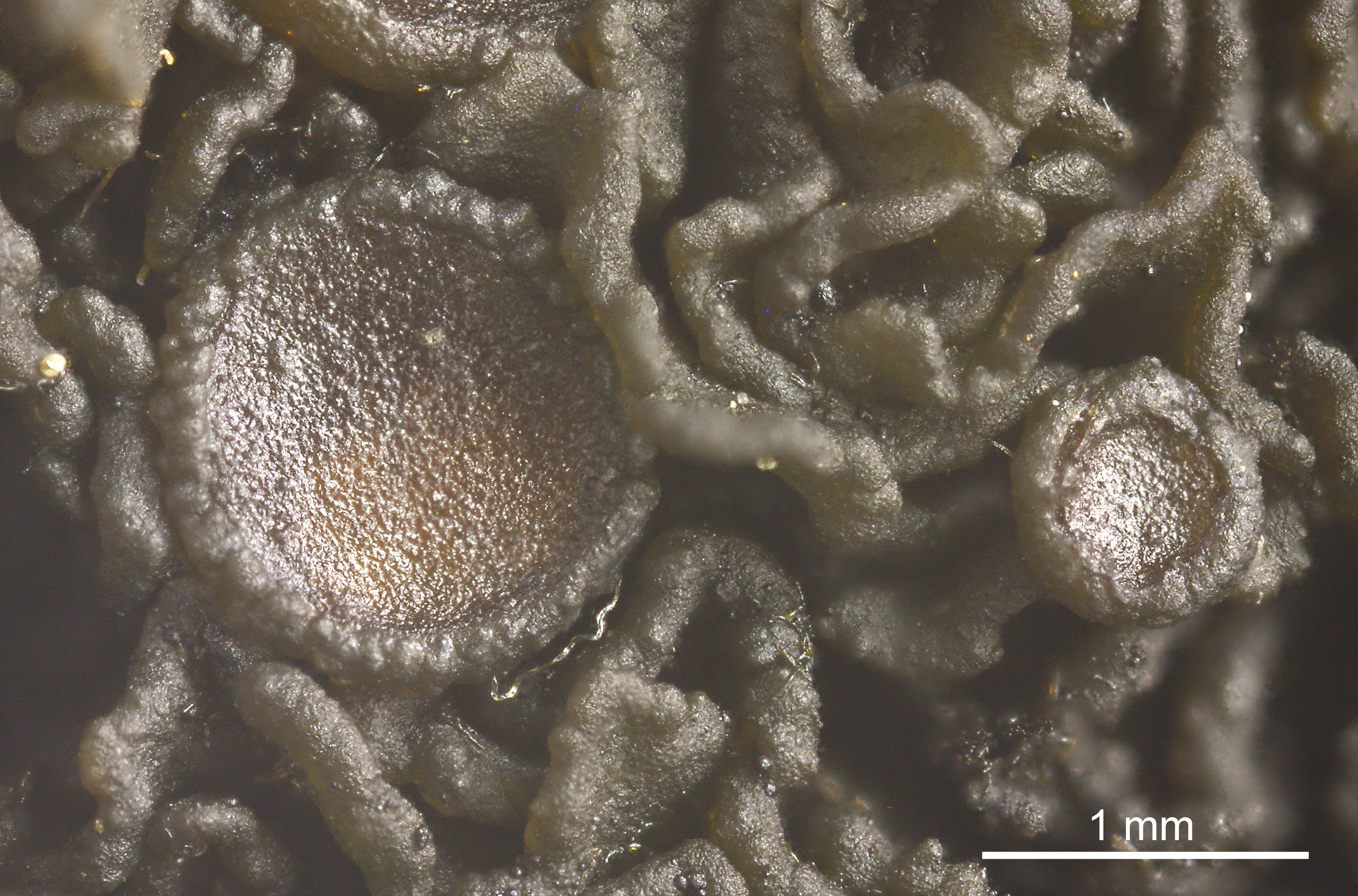
Close-up of apothecia clustered along the narrow, concave thallus lobes (scale bar: 1 mm)

The thallus of Lathagrium cristatum forms foliose rosettes usually 2–5 cm across, occasionally reaching 10 cm. It is rounded, semicircular or irregular in outline, and in older colonies the central parts often die away so that only a ring of live lobes remains. The lobes are rather thin and narrow, up to about 3 mm wide, radiating outwards and characteristically concave. They branch irregularly and may lie close together or remain more or less separate. The lobe margins are raised and wavy, ranging from nearly entire to distinctly cut or lobulate, and often show a sharply toothed outline. The upper surface is dark olive-green to brown, becoming almost black in older or drier thalli and is generally lacking vegetative propagules, with isidia reported only very rarely in some material. The underside bears rounded attachment structures (hapteres) that coalesce into conspicuous white tufts.

Fruiting bodies (apothecia) are frequently abundant but can be absent in some thalli. They are mainly confined to the lobe margins, where they form dense clusters of flat, disc-like structures up to 5 mm in diameter, either directly attached to the thallus or raised on short stalks; each disc has an even rim formed from the thallus tissue (a thalline margin). The asci typically contain four to six, rarely up to eight, spores. The ascospores are ellipsoidal with somewhat pointed ends, measuring about 18–32 × 8–13 micrometres (μm), and are somewhat muriform, with several internal cross-walls running in both transverse and longitudinal directions. In addition to apothecia, the species also produces asexual propagules. Conidiomata are common and tend to occur along the lobe margins in small, isidioid wart-like swellings. The conidia are colourless, cylindrical and slightly swollen towards the tip, measuring about 4–5 × 1–2 μm.

Some authors distinguish two morphotypes within the species, which are sometimes treated as the varieties cristatum and marginale. Var. cristatum tends to form larger foliose rosettes, often more than 5 cm across, with rather narrow (less than 2 mm), somewhat concave lobes that radiate outwards and branch irregularly. Var. marginale is similar in anatomy and spore characters, but differs in having more regularly furcate (forked) lobes; both varieties are saxicolous to terricolous and may occur together on the same calcareous substrates.

=== Chemistry ===
A mycosporine‑like compound isolated from Lathagrium cristatum was reported, in cell‑based assays, to reduce UVB‑associated DNA damage and cell injury, and a small pre-exposure trial on human skin found reduced erythema under the test conditions.

== Habitat, distribution, and ecology ==
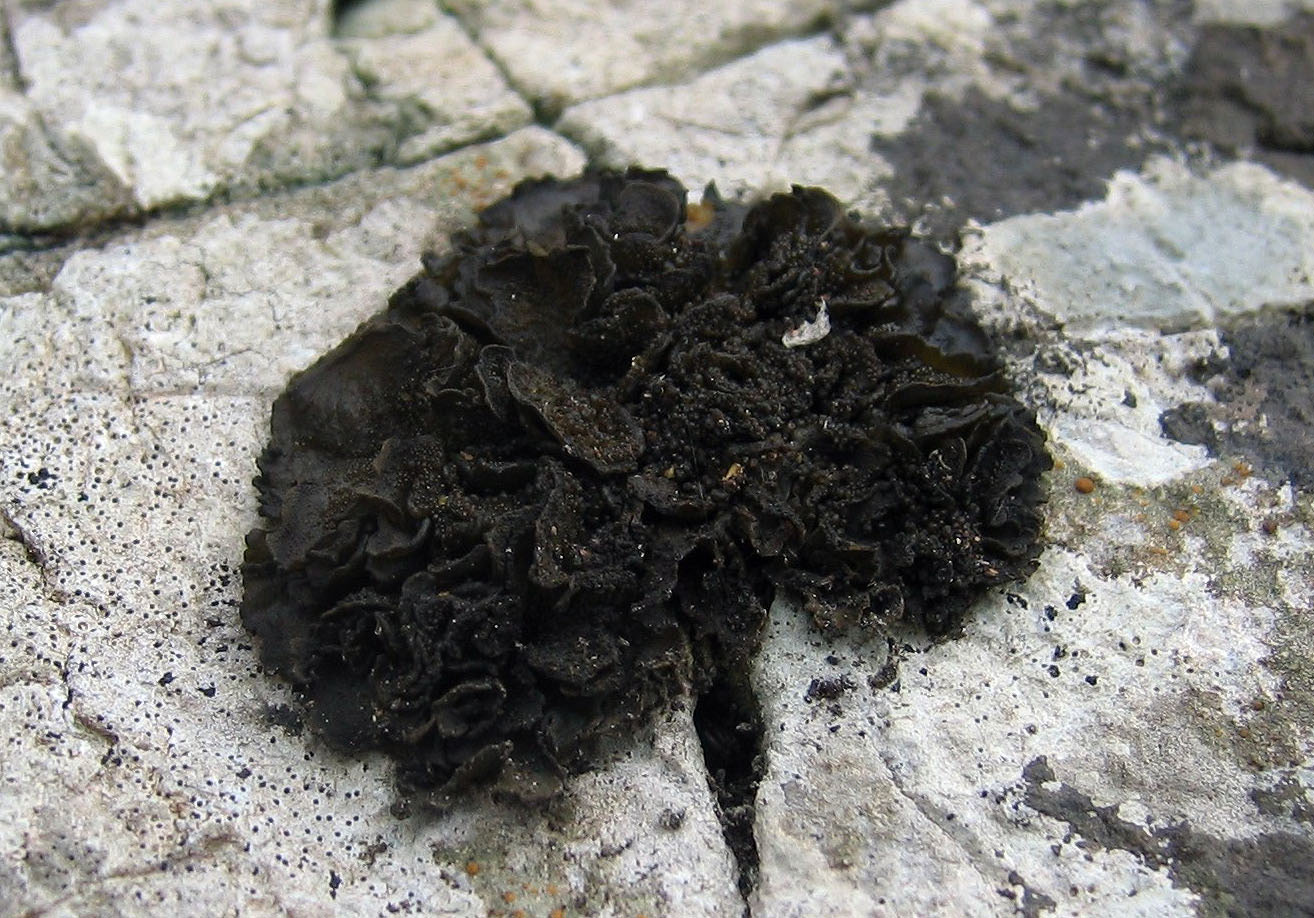
Lathagrium cristatum is a prominent member of the saxicolous lichen community growing on this rock near Traunsee, Austria

Lathagrium cristatum has an extensive geographic range and is considered a widespread Holarctic lichen. It is recorded across North America, Europe, northern Africa, and Asia (including Siberia and the Himalayas). Its occurrences span a wide climatic range, from arid lowland deserts to arctic and alpine zones, provided suitable substrate and moisture are present. For example, in the Sonoran region of southwestern North America it is found in scattered mountain localities (Arizona, Baja California and adjacent areas), even appearing on the Channel Islands of California. In contrast, it also reaches high latitudes and elevations, inhabiting alpine and subarctic environments in areas like Siberia and northern Europe. Within more temperate regions it is often common; in Great Britain and Ireland, for instance, this lichen occurs throughout the islands on suitable calcareous substrates. In Finland it is considered rare and is known mainly from the south-western, eastern and northern parts of the country.

This species is chiefly saxicolous, typically growing on hard calcareous rock such as limestone or dolomite. Colonies form foliose, rosette-like patches firmly attached to rock, often in exposed sites that receive intermittent water flow from rain. In dry Mediterranean climates L. cristatum may be confined to microsites where runoff water moistens the rock (for example, along rain-tracks on cliff faces). Although it is a calciphile, it can occasionally colonise other substrates – including siliceous rock or calcareous soil – especially in crevices filled with sand or detritus. The elevation range is broad: this lichen occurs from lowland areas up to montane and alpine zones, provided the habitats are relatively undisturbed. Two morphotypes (sometimes treated as varieties) have been distinguished based on habitat differences. The typical variety, L. cristatum var. cristatum, extends into cooler climates and can reach the alpine belt, whereas L. cristatum var. marginale is reported to have a more southerly, warmth-favored distribution.

Like other jelly lichens in the family Collemataceae, L. cristatum harbours a cyanobacterial photobiont (filamentous Nostoc cells) within its thallus. This symbiosis enables the lichen to fix atmospheric nitrogen. Lathagrium cristatum usually occupies natural, undisturbed habitats and is seldom found in areas subject to heavy pollution or physical disturbance.

== See also ==
- List of lichens named by Carl Linnaeus
