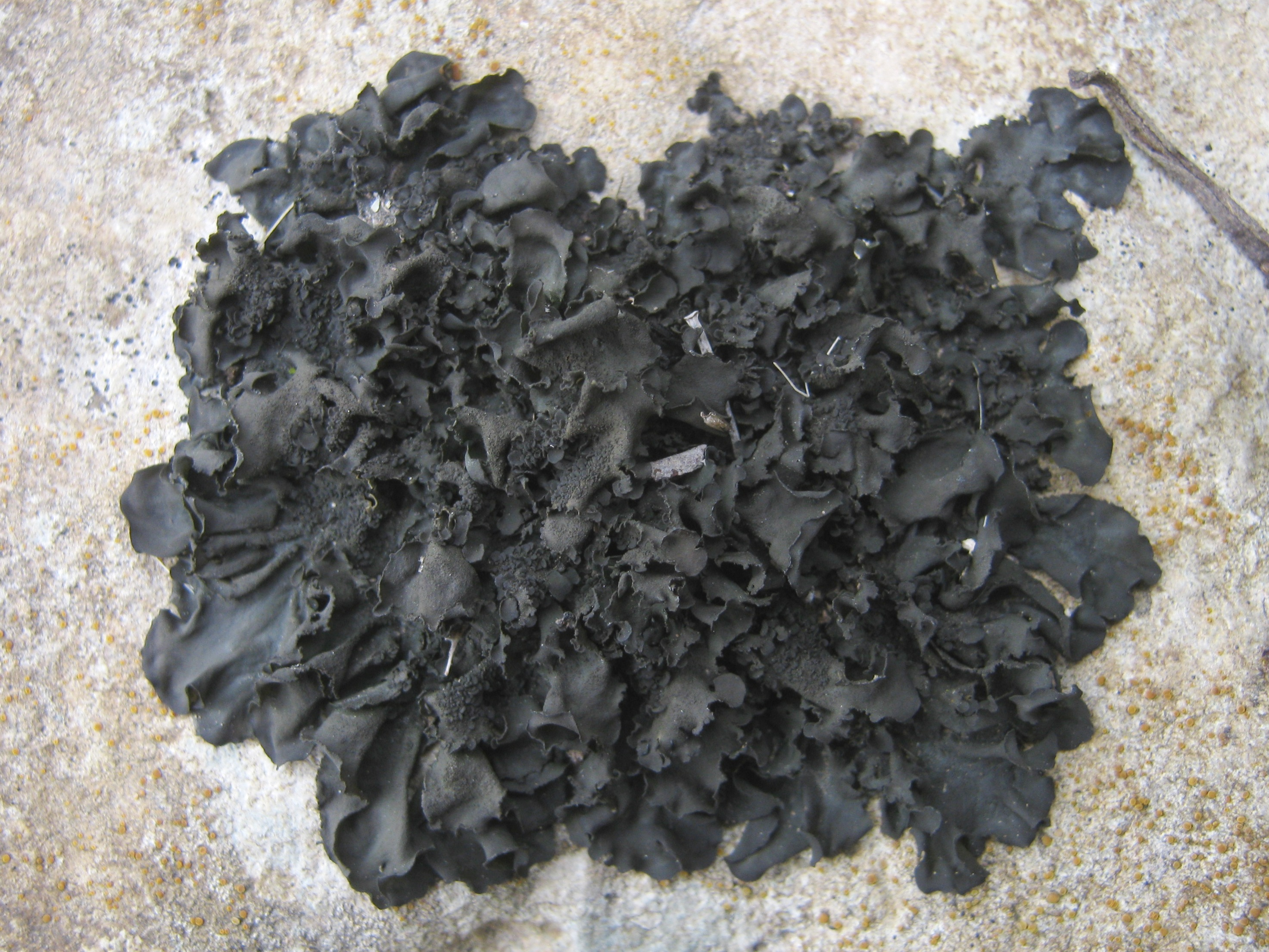
- Collema flaccidum

Scientific classification
- Kingdom: Fungi
- Division: Ascomycota
- Class: Lecanoromycetes
- Order: Peltigerales
- Family: Collemataceae
- Genus: Collema; Weber ex F.H.Wigg. (1780)

Type species
- Collema lactuca (Weber) Weber ex F.H.Wigg. (1780)

Synonyms
- List: Chiastosporum Dughi (1956); Collema P.Browne (1756); Collema sect. Collemodiopsis Vain. (1890); Collema sect. Eucollema Tuck. (1872); Collema subgen. Lathagrium Ach. (1810); Collematomyces E.A.Thomas ex Cif. & Tomas. (1953); Collemis Clem. (1931); Collemodiopsis (Vain.) B.de Lesd. (1910); Dicollema Clem. (1909); Eucollema (Tuck.) Horw. (1912); Kolman Adans. (1763); Synechoblastus Trevis. (1853); Tichodea Körb. (1848)

= Collema =

Genus of lichens

Collema (jelly lichen) is a genus of lichens in the family Collemataceae. The photobiont is the cyanobacterium genus Nostoc. Species in this genus typically grow on nutrient-rich bark or somewhat siliceous or calcareous rocks in humid environments.

== Description ==
Collema lichens are characterized by their medium to large size, with a diameter of 3 to 20 cm (1 to 8 in). They have a leaf-like, membranous structure that does not swell noticeably when wet. The upper surface of the thallus is dark olive-green to brown-black and is not hairy. The lobes are 2 to 15 mm broad, rounded, and usually flat or partially raised, with smooth or pustulate surfaces adorned with elongated ridges or folds.

Both upper and lower cortex are absent in Collema, and the photobiont Nostoc forms chains of cells throughout the thallus without creating a separate layer. Isidia can be present or absent, while soredia are not found in this genus. The reproductive structures, known as apothecia, have a pale brown to red-brown disc that can be flat or convex. The thalline margin is whole and sometimes displays isidia.

The true exciple consists of cells that can be either uniformly sized or elongated. The epithecium is indistinct and can be colourless or pigmented, while the hymenium is colorless and turns blue when treated with iodine. A more or less colourless hypothecium is also present. The hamathecium comprises paraphyses that separate in a solution of potassium hydroxide and may be unbranched or branched, often connecting near their tips, which can be club-shaped or round and exhibit a yellowish to reddish-brown hue.

The asci are club-shaped (clavate) with a strongly thickened apex, and both the apical dome and the downwardly projecting annulus and apical cap react blue to iodine. Each ascus produces eight spores that are narrowly ellipsoidal to spindle-shaped or nearly cylindrical with transverse septa. Conidiomata, or pycnidia, are immersed within the thallus and can be located on the margins or lamina with a pale ostiole. The conidia are rod-shaped with a slightly enlarged apex. No lichen products have been detected in Collema using thin-layer chromatography.

== Species ==
As of April 2023, Species Fungorum (in the Catalogue of Life) accepts 24 species of Collema.

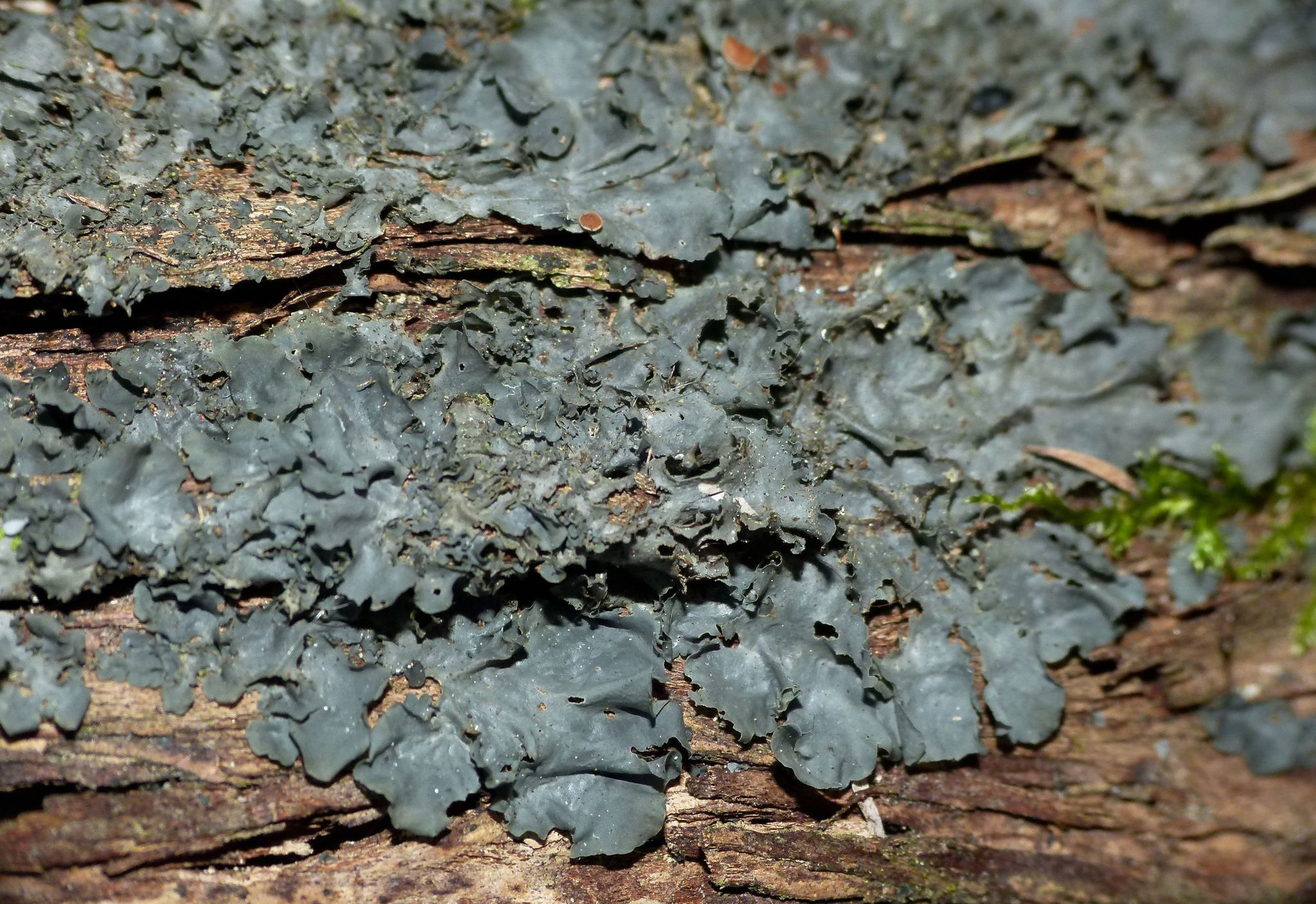
Collema subconveniens

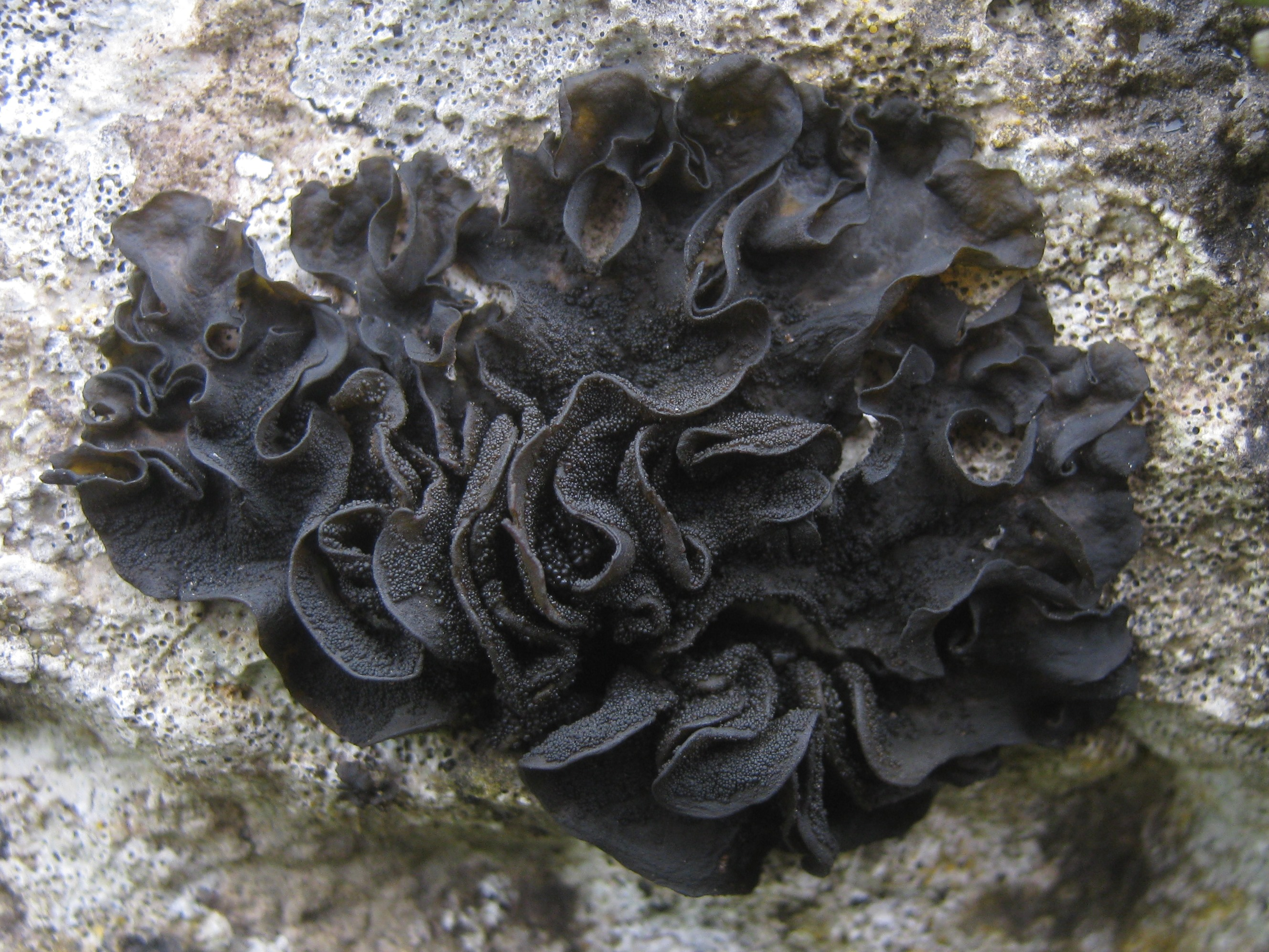
Collema subflaccidum

- Collema actinoptychum Nyl. (1868)
- Collema coniophilum Goward (2009) – Canada
- Collema flaccidum (Ach.) Ach. (1810)
- Collema furfuraceum (Schaer.) Du Rietz (1929)
- Collema glaucophthalmum Nyl. (1858)
- Collema glebulentum (Nyl. ex Cromb.) Degel. (1952)
- Collema implicatum Nyl. (1863)
- Collema insulare Degel. (1974)
- Collema japonicum (Müll.Arg.) Hue (1898)
- Collema laeve Hook.f. & Taylor (1844)
- Collema leptaleum Tuck. (1866)
- Collema leucocarpum Hook.f. & Taylor (1844)
- Collema marginale (Huds.) Hoffm. (1794)
- Collema nigrescens (Huds.) DC. (1805)
- Collema pulcellum Ach. (1814)
- Collema pustulatum Ach. (1814)
- Collema rugosum Kremp. (1870)
- Collema ryssoleum (Tuck.) A.Schneid. (1872)
- Collema sichuanense H.J.Liu & J.C.Wei (2003)) – China
- Collema subconveniens Nyl. (1888)
- Collema subflaccidum Degel. (1974)
- Collema subnigrescens Degel. (1954)
- Collema substipitatum Zahlbr. (1930)
