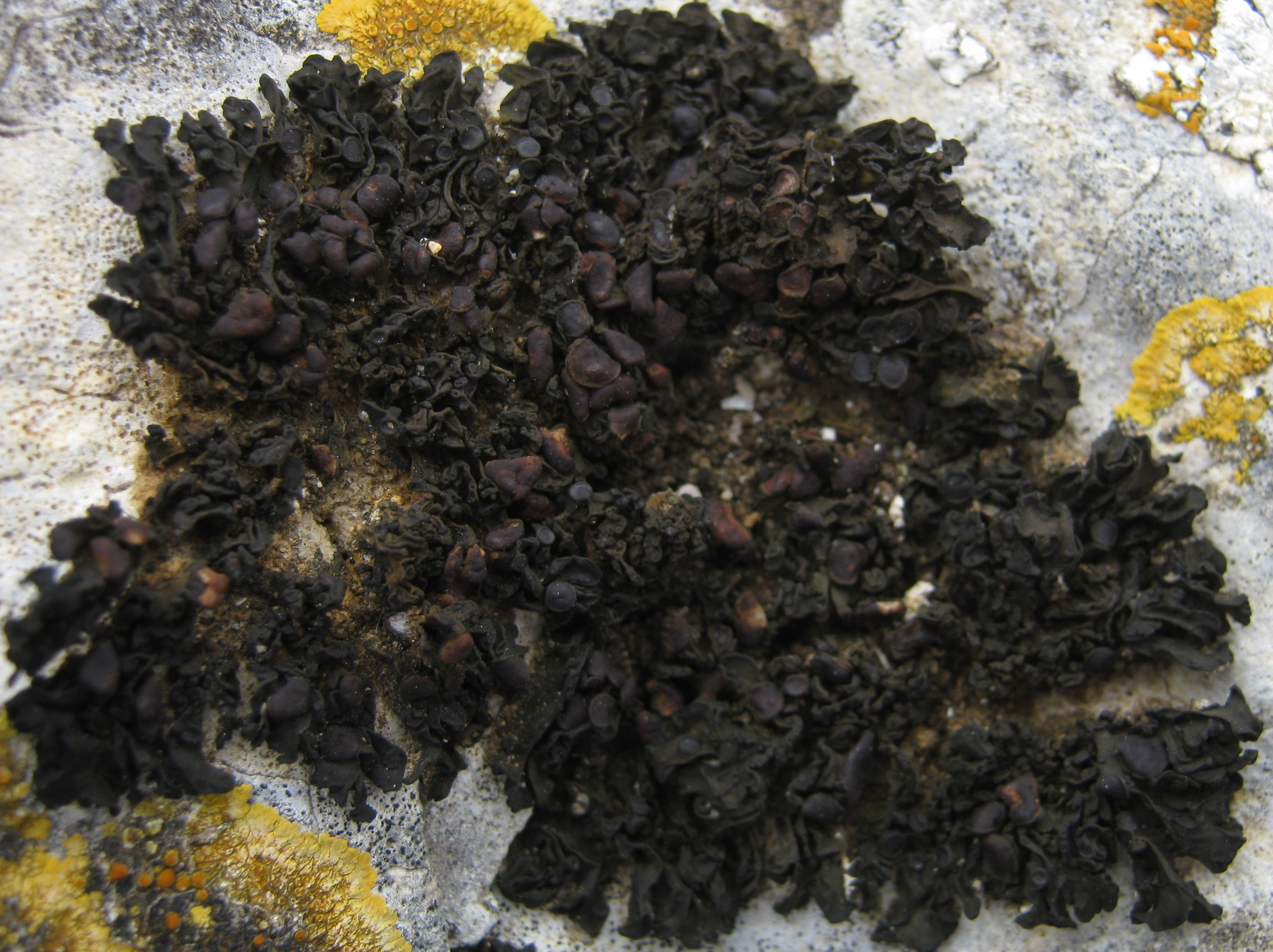
- Enchylium polycarpon

Scientific classification
- Domain: Eukaryota
- Kingdom: Fungi
- Division: Ascomycota
- Class: Lecanoromycetes
- Order: Peltigerales
- Family: Collemataceae
- Genus: Enchylium (Ach.) Gray (1821)

Synonyms
- Collema †† Enchylium Ach. (1810); Collema sect. Enchylium (Ach.) Bory (1823); Collemodes Fink (1918)

= Enchylium =

Genus of fungi

Enchylium is a genus of lichen-forming fungi in the family Collemataceae. The genus was originally established as a section of the related genus Collema in 1810, but molecular studies have since confirmed it forms a distinct evolutionary lineage. These lichens are characterised by their gelatinous, water-absorbing thalli that swell noticeably after rain and typically colonise bare soil or rock surfaces in well-lit environments. Most species are pioneers that help stabilise loose substrates before other plants and lichens become established.

== Taxonomy ==
Enchylium was introduced as a section of Collema by Erik Acharius in 1810. Acharius characterised this section by its distinctive thallus morphology: imbricate-plicate (overlapping and folded), suborbicular in outline, and composed of minute lobes that become markedly thickened and swollen when moist. This hydration response, where the small lobes dramatically expand when wet, appears to have been a key distinguishing feature that Acharius used to define the section within the broader genus Collema. The taxon was raised to generic rank by Samuel Frederick Gray in 1821. During that action Gray also selected Enchylium tenax (originally published as Lichen tenax) as the type species. A later name, Collemodes Fink (1918), is now regarded as a junior synonym of Enchylium.

Acharius used the name very broadly, and subsequent authors applied it to several unrelated jelly lichens. Modern work restricts the genus to cortex‑less cyanobacterial lichens with relatively small, broadly elliptic ascospore s that favour well‑lit, pioneer habitats on soil or rock. Species of Collema—also without a cortex—differ in having larger, narrower spores and a preference for shadier situations.

A multilocus phylogeny of the Collemataceae confirmed that the "Collema tenax group" forms an independent lineage. To reflect this, Otálora, Jørgensen and Wedin (2014) resurrected Enchylium for that clade and transferred nine formerly Collema species into the genus. This molecular reinterpretation underpins the current, much narrower circumscription of Enchylium used in checklists and floras.

== Description ==
Enchylium forms a gelatinous thallus that absorbs water readily and swells conspicuously after rain. Growth forms vary: some species spread as loosely attached crusts, others develop minute overlapping scales, and the more typical representatives produce foliose rosettes whose radiating or elongated lobes can lie flat or tilt upwards. The upper surface is usually dark olive‑green to black, ranging from smooth to ridged or pleated, but it is never covered by a woolly tomentum. The thallus lacks a differentiated upper or lower cortex; instead, intertwined fungal hyphae are threaded with chains of the cyanobacterium Nostoc. Vegetative propagules are confined to the presence or absence of tiny finger‑like isidia, as soredia do not form in the genus.

The lichen produces numerous, stalkless apothecia that punctuate the lobes or their margins. Each bears a red‑brown disc framed by a rim of thallus tissue that can be smooth, granular, or itself studded with isidia and usually persists as the apothecium ages. The proper exciple beneath this rim is made of vertically arranged hyphae, while the hymenium remains clear but turns blue in iodine tests (I+). Slender paraphyses may branch and fuse near their tips; these apices often broaden into club‑shaped or nearly spherical cells that can appear yellowish to reddish brown. Cylindrical asci contain two, four, or eight ascospores and show a strongly thickened apex that stains deep blue with iodine, including a downward‑projecting ring (annulus) and apical cap. The spores vary among species: some are divided by transverse septa, others develop a partly muriform pattern of cross‑walls, but all are colourless.

Asexual reproduction takes place in immersed pycnidia, either along the lobe edges or on the lamina, each opening through a pale ostiole to release rod‑shaped or needle‑like conidia. Thin-layer chromatography has not detected any characteristic secondary metabolites in the genus.

== Habitat and distribution ==
Most members of Enchylium are pioneers on bare soil (terricolous) or rock surfaces (saxicolous), especially in open, well‑lit sites where their gelatinous thalli can swell rapidly after rain and stabilise loose substrate. These species belong to the former Collema tenax group and typically initiate colonisation on nutrient‑poor ground or stone before other lichens and mosses arrive.

Although the genus as a whole is widespread, individual species show marked ecological preferences. E. expansum is almost restricted to moss‑covered calcareous rock kept constantly damp by seepage; it has a circumpolar Arctic‑alpine range and descends only to high‑mountain seepage sites (up to roughly 3300 m elevation in the southern Rocky Mountains), with an isolated outlier on the Kerguelen Islands. By contrast, E. substellatum favours dry, sandy or clay‑rich soils in cold‑continental climates and shows a disjunct distribution from the Rocky Mountains and north‑east Greenland to inner China, with a solitary European record in Spain's Sierra Nevada.

== Species ==
As of July 2025, Species Fungorum (in the Catalogue of Life) accept 12 species of Enchylium:

- Enchylium bachmanianum (Fink) Otálora, P.M.Jørg. & Wedin (2013)
- Enchylium coccophorum (Tuck.) Otálora, P.M.Jørg. & Wedin (2013)
- Enchylium confertum (Hepp ex Arnold) Otálora, P.M.Jørg. & Wedin (2013)
- Enchylium conglomeratum (Hoffm.) Otálora, P.M.Jørg. & Wedin (2013)
- Enchylium expansum (Degel.) P.M.Jørg. (2015)
- Enchylium flagellatum (Degel.) Otálora, P.M.Jørg. & Wedin (2013)
- Enchylium ligerinum (Hy) Otálora, P.M.Jørg. & Wedin (2013)
- Enchylium limosum (Ach.) Otálora, P.M.Jørg. & Wedin (2013)
- Enchylium nipponicum (Degel.) Otálora, P.M.Jørg. & Wedin (2013)
- Enchylium polycarpon (Hoffm.) Otálora, P.M.Jørg. & Wedin (2013)
- Enchylium substellatum (H.Magn.) P.M.Jørg. (2015)
- Enchylium tenax (Sw.) Gray (1821)
