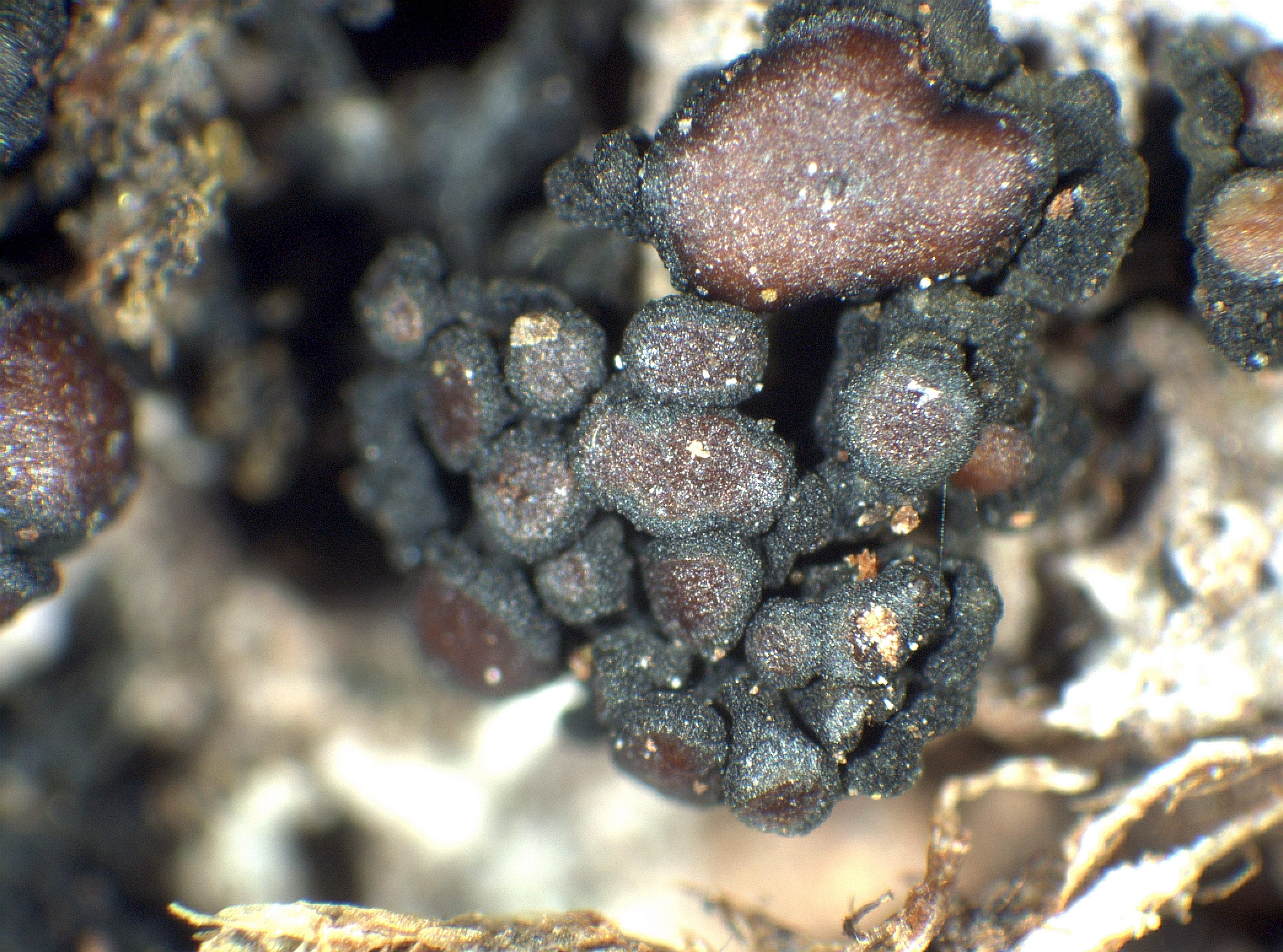

Conservation status
- Secure (NatureServe)

Scientific classification
- Kingdom: Fungi
- Division: Ascomycota
- Class: Lecanoromycetes
- Order: Peltigerales
- Family: Collemataceae
- Genus: Enchylium
- Species: E. conglomeratum

Binomial name
- Enchylium conglomeratum (Hoffm.) Otálora, P.M. Jørg. & Wedin (2013)

Synonyms
- Collema aggregatum var. conglomeratum (Hoffm.) H. Olivier, Flore analytique et dichotomique des Lichens de l'Orne et départements circonvoisins 1: 103 (1882); Collema conglomeratum Hoffm., Deutschl. Fl., Zweiter Theil (Erlangen): 102 (1796) [1795]; Collema fasciculare var. conglomeratum (Hoffm.) Ach., Lich. univ.: 640 (1810); Collema nigrescens var. conglomeratum (Hoffm.) Flot., Linnaea 23: 198 (1850); Gabura conglomerata (Hoffm.) Kuntze, Revis. gen. pl. (Leipzig) 2: 873 (1891); Lathagrium conglomeratum (Hoffm.) Rabenh., Flecht. Europ. 9: no. 254 (1857); Parmelia fascicularis var. conglomerata (Hoffm.) Ach., Methodus, Sectio prior: 240 (1803); Parmelia nigrescens var. conglomerata (Hoffm.) Schaer., Lich. helv. spicil. 11: 526 (1842); Synechoblastus conglomeratus (Hoffm.) Körb., Syst. lich. germ. (Breslau): 412 (1855)

= Enchylium conglomeratum =

Species of fungus

Enchylium conglomeratum, commonly known as dotted jelly lichen, is a species of foliose lichen in the family Collemataceae. Formerly known as Collema conglomeratum, it was renamed in 2013. (Note: Basionym: Collema conglomeratum Hoffm. - Deutschl. Fl., Zweiter Theil (Erlangen): 102 (1796) ['1795'].) This lichen has a fragmented distribution across the Holarctic region, occurring in both North America and Europe.

Enchylium conglomeratum thrives in relatively acidic conditions and moderate light levels, typically growing on the bark of hardwood trees such as oak and walnut, as well as occasionally on calcareous rocks. Its thallus structure is characterized by diminutive, cushion-like formations with flattened lobes, lacking a proper cortex.

Reproductively, Enchylium conglomeratum exhibits lecanorine apothecia and immersed, globose pycnidia, indicative of both sexual and asexual reproductive strategies. Despite its broad but disjunct distribution, the species faces varying conservation assessments. While globally assessed by NatureServe as G5 (secure) with some uncertainty, regional evaluations differ, with designations ranging from Extinct (Ex) by the British Lichen Society to Regionally Extinct (RE) in Switzerland. Taxonomically, Enchylium conglomeratum underwent a revision in 2013, leading to its transfer from the genus Collema to Enchylium. Synonyms include Collema pycnocarpum and Synechoblastus conglomeratus.

== Taxonomy ==
Enchylium conglomeratum was originally described as Collema conglomeratum by Hoffm. in 1795 and was subsequently published in the 1796 publication "Deutschl. Fl., Zweiter Theil," with the typification based on specimens collected anonymously and illustrated by Dillenius. C. conglomeratum underwent taxonomic revision becoming Enchylium conglomeratum, as it was formally transferred to the genus Enchylium by Otálora, P.M. Jørg. & Wedin in 2013. (Note: The taxonomic revision took place in 2013 and was subsequently published in Fungal Diversity 64(1): 286 in 2014.) Belonging to the family Collemataceae within the phylum Ascomycota, this species is classified under the class Lecanoromycetes and the order Peltigerales.

=== Synonymy ===
Enchylium conglomeratum, formerly identified under various synonyms, has undergone taxonomic revisions over time, resulting in a list of historical names used in scientific literature. These synonyms include Biatora vernalis f. conglomerata, Collema aggregatum var. conglomeratum, Collema fasciculare var. conglomeratum, among others.

== Description ==
=== Thallus ===
The thallus of Enchylium conglomeratum has a diminutive, foliose to subsquamulose (Note: The term "subsquamulose" refers to a lichen thallus structure that is partially, but not fully, squamulose.) appearance when hydrated, attaining a gelatinous thickness of up to 500 micrometers. It forms rounded, cushion-like formations measuring 2–10 millimeters wide, which are often anchored at a central point and can merge to cover larger areas. The thallus consists of a sparse arrangement of flattened, 0.5–1.5 mm wide lobes that are appressed to erect, typically branched, and distinctly swollen with margins ranging from entire to crenate or lobulate. The upper surface exhibits a dark olive-green to brown or black coloration, lacking any pruina and varying from smooth to rarely warty, without isidia present. The lower side is generally paler in hue and bears scattered white rhizines. Neither an upper nor lower cortex is typically developed. Examination of the lichen's thallus structure under a light microscope reveals, unlike the thallus of the closely related species Leptogium digitatum, the thallus of E. conglomeratum lacks a proper cortex.

Additionally, the thallus of E. conglomeratum is noted to not be paraplectenchymatous (a cell arrangement where the hyphae are oriented in all directions) throughout, in contrast to the fully paraplectenchymatous thallus structure seen in the micrograph of a related jelly lichen Blennothallia crispa.

=== Apothecia ===
The apothecia of Enchylium conglomeratum are common and lecanorine in structure, frequently clustered along the lobe margins or at lobe tips, often obscuring the underlying thallus. The apothecia are sessile and constricted at their base, ranging in size from 0.5 to 1.5 (-2) millimeters across. They possess a disc that varies from flat to convex in shape, exhibiting a dark reddish-brown coloration. Surrounding the disc is a rather thick, unbroken thalline margin with a smooth, even surface.

The thalline excipular layer of E. conglomeratum lacks a cortex, while the proper exciple exhibits a euthyplectenchymatous (elongated) construction, reaching up to 20 micrometers in lateral thickness. The epithecium (Note: The outer layer of the fruiting body in fungi and lichens, equivalent to the hymenium in fungi and forming a film over the hymenium in lichens.) is brownish, the hymenium colorless and 60–80 micrometers tall (iodine-positive blue), the paraphyses simple to sparsely branched, and the hypothecium (Note: The dense hyphal tissue beneath the hymenium.) yellowish. The asci are 8-spored, cylindrical-clavate, with a strongly thickened apex and a downward-projecting, deeply blue-staining tubular structure when treated with potassium iodide. The ascospores are 1(-3)-septate, hyaline, narrowly fusiform with acute apices, measuring (10-)15-24(-26) x 3–4.5(-5.5) micrometers.

=== Pycnidia ===
Pycnidia are common in Enchylium conglomeratum, they are immersed, and globose, paler than the surrounding thallus. The conidia are bacilliform, slightly swollen at both ends, 3-4 x 1 micrometers in size. The photobiont is a cyanobacterium, likely Nostoc with cells arranged in elongated chains.

== Chemistry ==
All spot tests performed on samples of Enchylium conglomeratum yielded negative results, indicating the lichen did not exhibit any characteristic color changes when exposed to standard chemical reagents used in lichen identification. Furthermore, no lichen substances or specialized compounds were detected through chemical analysis.

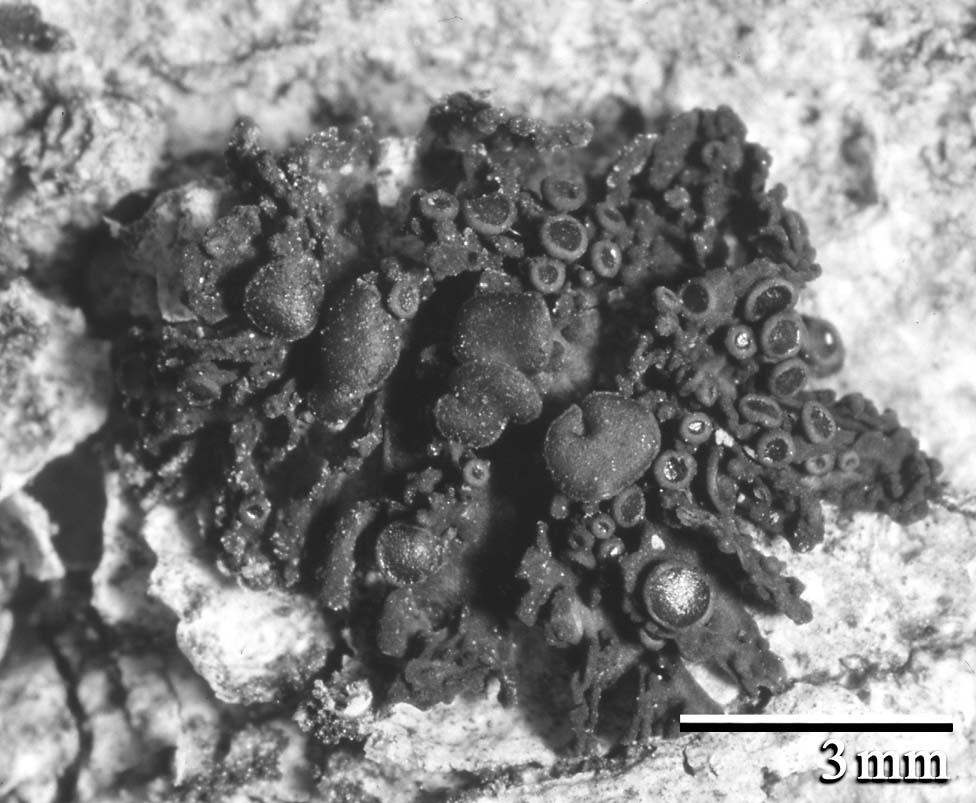
Collema conglomeratum var. conglomeratum Hoffm. sample collected in 2010 by ASU Lichen Herbarium

E. conglomeratum can grow on substrates with a pH range of 2–3, indicating it is adapted to relatively acidic conditions, such as those found on the bark of oak trees (Quercus) and non-eutrophicated bark. In terms of solar irradiation, the lichen is adapted to habitats with moderate to high light levels, with a tolerance range of 3–5 on the provided scale, avoiding extreme direct solar exposure.

Additionally, E. conglomeratum demonstrates a moderate level of tolerance to aridity, with a rating of 3 on the 5-point scale, suggesting it is a mesophytic species that can occur in areas with average moisture levels. Regarding eutrophication, the species can tolerate low to moderate levels of nutrient enrichment, with a tolerance range of 1–3.

E. conglomeratum also exhibits a poleotolerance rating of 1–2, indicating it typically occurs in natural or semi-natural habitats, and is not as tolerant of heavily disturbed areas. Its altitudinal distribution ranges from the eu-Mediterranean belt (evergreen Quercus ilex forest) to the submediterranean belt (deciduous Quercus-Carpinus forests), suggesting it can thrive in both lowland and mid-elevation environments.

== Distribution and ecology ==
=== Historical observations ===
Known as "conglomerate jelly lichen", it was initially documented growing on various substrates, including rotten wood, bark, and rocks in Germany. By the end of the 1800s, Collema conglomeratum had been documented by Harvard University's Farlow Herbarium throughout various regions of the United States, such as Missouri, Massachusetts, and Tennessee. Specimens collected in Missouri were observed in Johnson's Shut-Ins State Park, specifically near the main shut-in along the East Fork of Black River in Reynolds County. This lichen was found growing corticolously on Juniperus virginiana trees within an open stand consisting of oak (Quercus), pine (Pinus), and juniper (Juniperus) species. The habitat comprised rhyolite ledges and talus, with elevations ranging from 245 to 335 meters (804 to 1,099 ft) above sea level. C. conglomeratum is the first lichen species recorded from Iowa. The species was collected by Bruce Fink in 1880.

In the 20th century, C. conglomeratum was predominantly discovered in Central America, notably situated within the Neotropics. Specimens were observed at altitudes varying between 650 and 850 meters above sea level. Specimens collected from other parts of the United States were found growing on Quercus species, including evergreen oak (Q. hypoleucoides, Q. emoryi) and deciduous oak (Q. arizonica), as well as pine (P. latifolia) forest. C. conglomeratum was identified in other regions, such as Pakistan, where it was observed growing on the bark of Morus serrata.

=== Enchylium conglomeratum ===
Enchylium conglomeratum is known to inhabit the bark of trees, making it a corticolous species. It thrives in nutrient-rich sites within woodland and forest environments, frequently associating with hardwood trees such as walnut (Juglans), Quercus (oak), Platanus, Olea europaea (olive), and other broad-leaved trees. However, the lichen has also been found on calcareous rocks.

The overall distribution of E. conglomeratum is characterized as fragmented across the Holarctic region, spanning both North America and Europe.

Within the Sonoran biogeographic province of North America, E. conglomeratum has been documented in central and southern Arizona, as well as the Mexican states of Baja California, Baja California Sur, Sonora, and Chihuahua. In the United States, it has been reported from the Cumberland Plateau, Southern Blue Ridge, and Piedmont physiographic regions of the state of Georgia. It has been observed in several other states including Colorado, Iowa, Indiana, Kentucky, Minnesota, North Carolina, Ohio, Pennsylvania, and Wyoming. In Canada, it has been observed in New Brunswick, Newfoundland, Ontario, and Quebec.

Across the Atlantic, E. conglomeratum is known to occur in numerous regions of Italy, including Veneto, Trentino-Alto Adige, Lombardy, Piedmont, Emilia-Romagna, Liguria, Tuscany, Marche, Umbria, Lazio, Abruzzo, Sardinia, Campania, Apulia, Basilicata, and Sicily. Datasets collected from 1962 to 2015 show that the elevational distribution of the lichen in Italy is also quite broad, spanning from as low as 20 meters above sea level up to 865 meters in elevation.

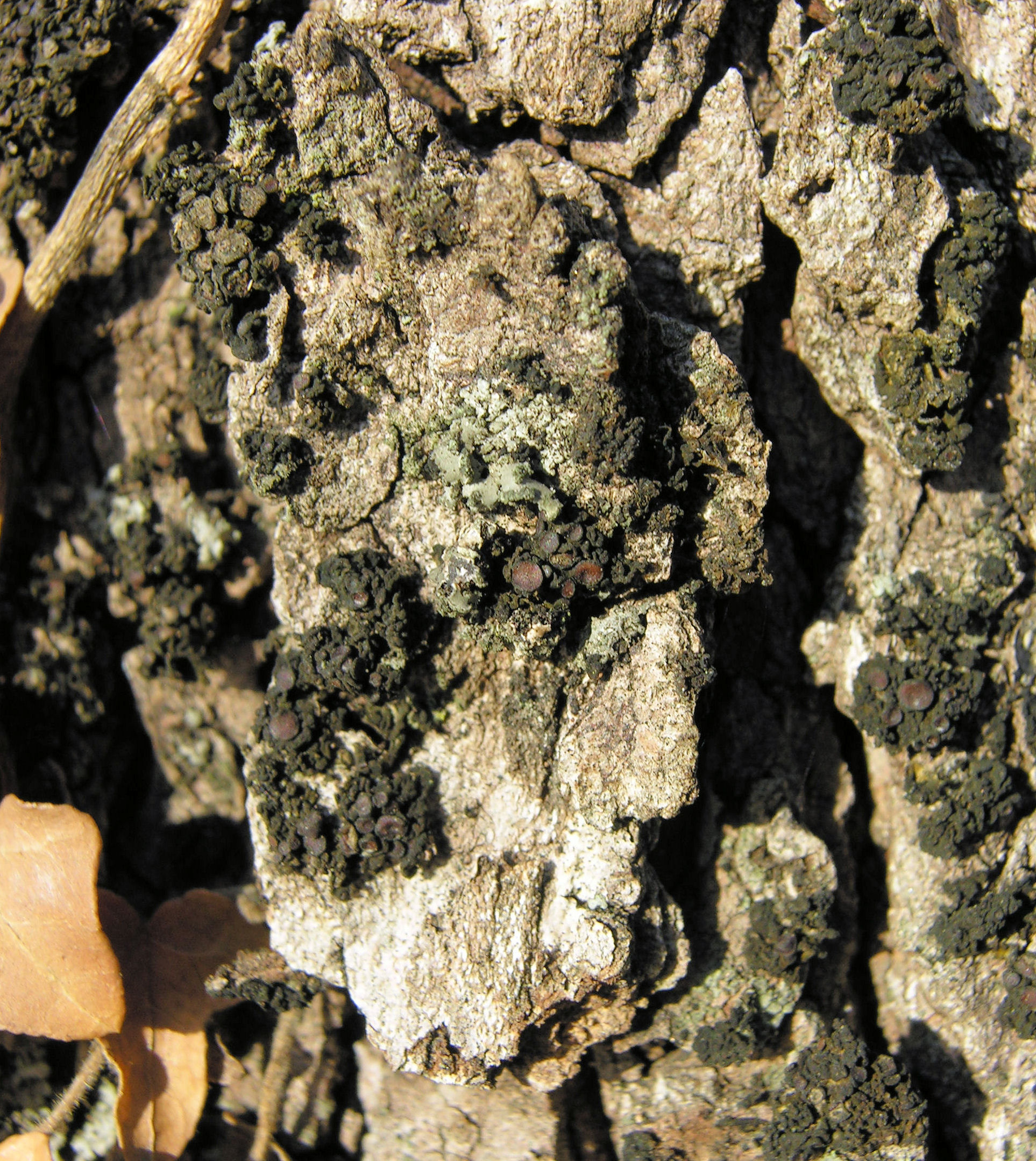
Enchylium conglomeratum growing on the bark of a tree in Lipica/Lipizza, Slovenia. This foliose lichen species is known to inhabit the nutrient-rich bark of hardwood trees, particularly in woodland and forest environments within its fragmented Holarctic distribution.

Despite its broad but disjunct range, E. conglomeratum is considered a rare lichen in many parts of its distribution. The specific threats to this species and its overall conservation status remain largely unknown. Historically, the lichen appears to have been more widespread, but it is now frequently restricted to the vicinity of small mountain valley settlements, where local populations can be relatively abundant.

=== Commoners-rarity ===
In the Alpine, Subalpine, Oromediterranean, and Montane belts, Enchylium conglomeratum is completely absent. Within the Submediterranean belt, the species is classified as very rare, while in the Humid submediterranean belt, it is considered rare. Reaching the level of extreme rarity, the lichen is found only extremely rarely in the Humid mediterranean belt. Additionally, E. conglomeratum is absent from the Padanian area and Dry mediterranean belt.

== Conservation status ==
=== Global status ===
According to NatureServe, the global conservation status of Enchylium conglomeratum is ranked as G5?, indicating the species is secure globally, but with some uncertainty. When rounded, the global status becomes G5. The global status was last reviewed by NatureServe on December 8, 2000.

=== National and subnational statuses ===
In Canada, Enchylium conglomeratum is ranked as N2N3, indicating it is considered vulnerable to imperiled nationally. At the provincial level, it is ranked as SU (unranked) in Newfoundland, S1 (critically imperiled) in New Brunswick, S2S3 (imperiled to vulnerable) in Ontario, and SNR (unranked) in Quebec.

Within the United States, the overall national ranking of E. conglomeratum by NatureServe is NNR, meaning the status is unranked nationally. At the state level, the species is also ranked as SNR (unranked) in Colorado, Georgia, Indiana, Minnesota, North Carolina, Pennsylvania, and Wyoming. In Iowa, it is ranked as SH, indicating it is possibly extirpated from the state. Kentucky is the only state with a more certain ranking of S3, considered vulnerable. E. conglomeratum is marked as an "endangered" species in the state of Ohio by the Ohio Department of Natural Resources.

=== United Kingdom ===
British Lichen Society, using the International Union for Conservation of Nature (IUCN) criteria has designated Enchylium conglomeratum as Extinct (Ex) in their most recent assessment as of March 2024.

=== Switzerland ===
The conservation status of Enchylium conglomeratum in Switzerland is Regionally Extinct (RE) according to the 2002 Red List of Switzerland. However, despite its apparent disappearance from Switzerland, E. conglomeratum is still recognized as a high priority species for conservation efforts at the national level. The 2019 list of National Priority Species in Switzerland has assigned the lichen a priority ranking of 2 (high priority). The 2019 national priority assessment also categorizes E. conglomeratum as having a clear need for specific conservation actions, with a Measure-B ranking of 2. Despite this high conservation priority, Switzerland's level of responsibility for the overall protection of E. conglomeratum is relatively low, ranked as a 1 on the national responsibility scale.
