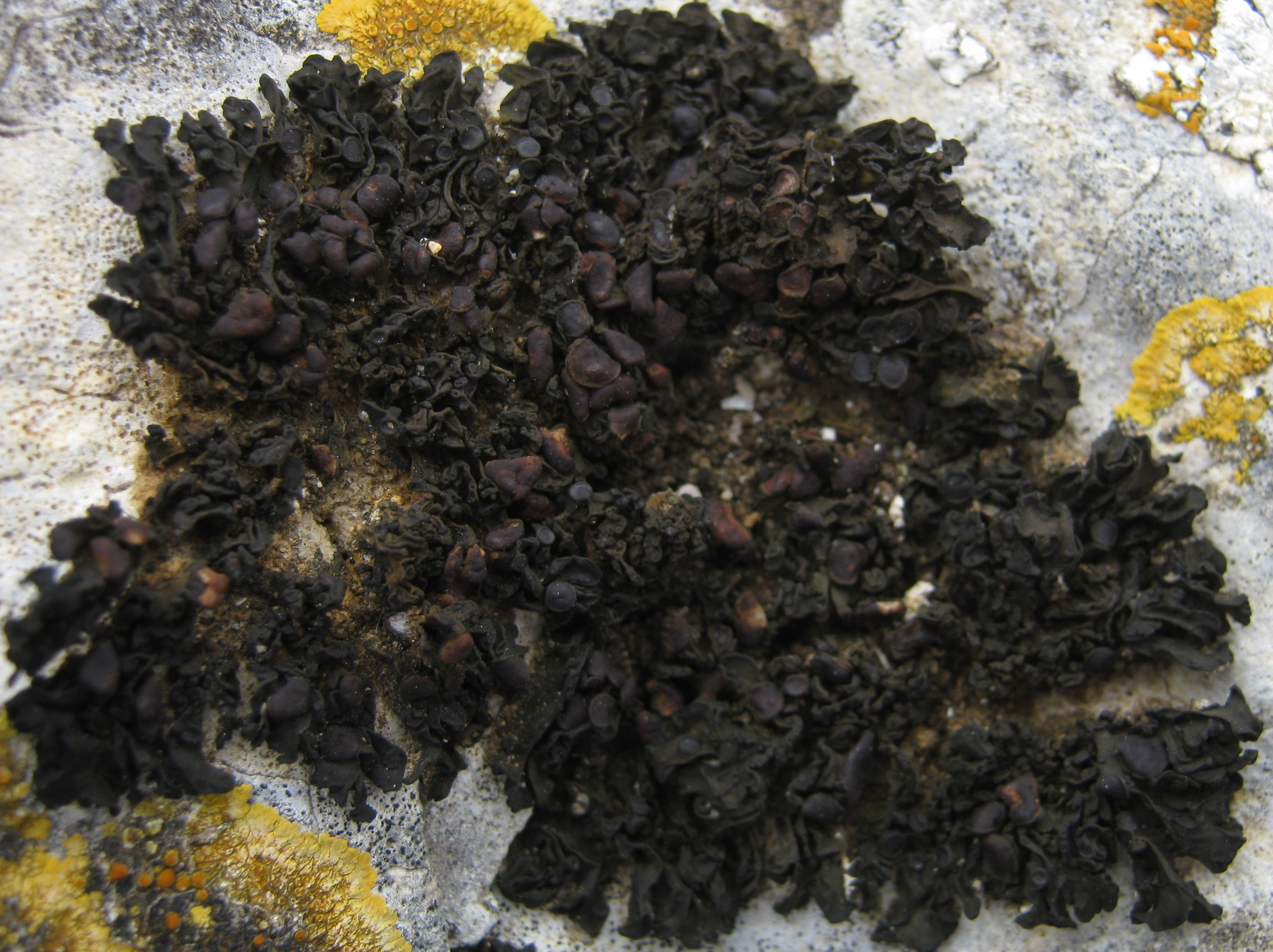

Conservation status
- Least Concern (IUCN 3.1)

Scientific classification
- Kingdom: Fungi
- Division: Ascomycota
- Class: Lecanoromycetes
- Order: Peltigerales
- Family: Collemataceae
- Genus: Enchylium
- Species: E. polycarpon

Binomial name
- Enchylium polycarpon (Hoffm.) Otálora, P.M. Jørg. & Wedin, 2013

Synonyms
- Collema polycarpon Hoffm. 1795, Eucollema polycarpon (Hoffm.) Horw. 1912, Lathagrium polycarpon (Hoffm.) Arnold 1871, Synechoblastus polycarpus (Hoffm.) Dalla Torre & Sarnth. 1902, Synechoblastus wyomingensis Fink 1934

= Enchylium polycarpon =

Species of fungus

Enchylium polycarpon, commonly known as the shaly jelly lichen, is a species of foliose lichen in the family Collemataceae. Formerly known as Collema polycarpon, it was renamed in 2013 following a taxonomic revision. This lichen has a widespread global distribution, occurring in various regions of North America, Europe, Africa, and Asia.

E. polycarpon thrives in moderately alkaline or calcareous environments, preferring moderate to high levels of direct sunlight. It typically grows on calcareous substrates, such as limestone and dolomite rocks, in exposed and periodically wet habitats. Its thallus structure is characterized by an expansive, rosette-like cushion with a deeply lobed morphology. Notably, it lacks a true cortex.

Reproductively, E. polycarpon produces abundant lecanorine apothecia and immersed pycnidia, indicating both sexual and asexual reproductive strategies. Despite its broad global distribution, the conservation status of this lichen varies significantly across different biogeographic regions, with the species considered rare or threatened in some areas.

Taxonomically, E. polycarpon was originally described as Collema polycarpon by Georg Franz Hoffmann in 1796, before being transferred to the genus Enchylium in 2013 by Otálora, P.M. Jørg. & Wedin. Over time, E. polycarpon has been known by various synonymous names in the scientific literature, such as Collema fasciculare var. polycarpon, Collema melaenum var. polycarpon, Collema multifidum var. polycarpon, Collema plicatum var. polycarpon, and the original Collema polycarpon Hoffm.

== Taxonomy ==
=== Etymology ===
Enchylium polycarpon, commonly referred to as the shaly jelly lichen, was originally described as Collema polycarpon by Georg Franz Hoffmann in 1796 in the publication "Deutschlands Flora, Zweiter Theil".

The epithet "polycarpon" originates from Greek, where "poly" means "many," and "carpon" refers to "fruit" or "seed," alluding to the numerous reproductive structures characteristic of this species.

=== Taxonomic revision ===
Collema polycarpon was transferred to the genus Enchylium from Collema in 2013 by Otálora, P.M. Jørg. & Wedin, as part of a taxonomic revision published in 2014. The species E. polycarpon (Hoffm.) Otálora, P.M. Jørg. & Wedin belongs to the family Collemataceae.

E. polycarpon has a subspecies, E. polycarpon subsp. corcyrense (Arnold) Otálora, P.M. Jørg. & Wedin. This subspecies was previously known as Lathagrium orbiculare var. corcyrense Arnold., and has additional synonyms such as Collema polycarpon subsp. corcyrense (Arnold) Pišút and Collema ragusanum Zahlbr.

=== Synonymy ===
Enchylium polycarpon, formerly identified under various synonyms, has undergone taxonomic revisions, resulting in a list of historical names used in scientific literature. These synonyms include Collema fasciculare var. polycarpon (Hoffm.) Torss., Collema melaenum var. polycarpon (Hoffm.) Nyl., Collema multifidum var. polycarpon (Hoffm.) Rabenh., Collema plicatum var. polycarpon (Hoffm.) Kremp., and Collema polycarpon Hoffm.

== Description ==
=== Thallus ===
Enchylium polycarpon exhibits a distinctive foliose thallus that is gelatinous and thick when hydrated, typically measuring 200–300 μm in depth. This thallus forms expansive rosette-like cushions, ranging from around 3 centimeters up to a maximum of 20 centimetres (7.9 in) in diameter. A key structural feature of the thallus is its deeply lobed morphology, with the lobes radiating outward from the center of the cushion.

The individual lobes of the corticolous or terricolous thallus are quite elongated, generally 2–4(−6) millimeters in width. Numerous small, ascending or erect lobules are frequently present along the lobe margins, especially towards the interior of the thallus. The lobe tips often exhibit a swollen, plicate (folded) appearance, contributing to a somewhat channeled effect towards the outer edges of the cushion.

In terms of coloration, the upper surface of the thallus can range from olive-green to brownish or nearly black hues. Some specimens may bear granular, isidia-like outgrowths on the upper surface. The lower thallus surface is typically paler than the upper side and is dotted with tufts of white, root-like hapters. The thallus lacks both an upper and a lower cortex.

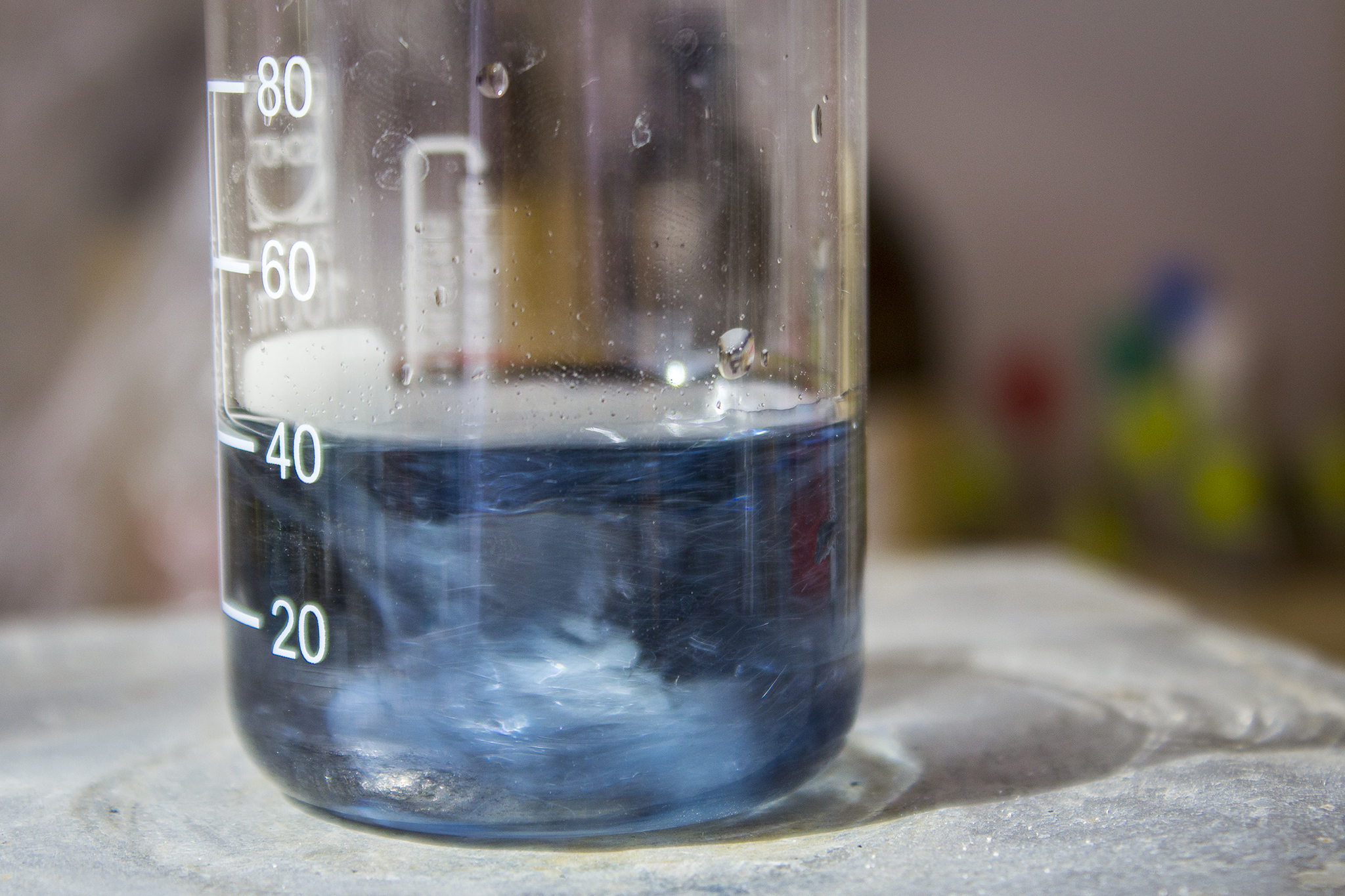
A positive iodine reaction (I+ blue), as would be seen using the hymenium of Enchylium polycarpon.

=== Apothecia ===
Ascomata in the form of lecanorine apothecia are abundantly produced by Enchylium polycarpon, crowding the central region of the thallus and frequently arising directly from the marginal lobules. These apothecia range from sessile to short-stalked, with a diameter of 1.5–3.5 millimeters. The apothecial disc varies from reddish-brown to dark black, surrounded by a thick, smooth, and persistent thalline margin. Anatomically, the thalline exciple is ecorticate, while the proper exciple is relatively thin and exhibits a euthyplectenchymatous (elongated) to subparaplectenchymatous structure.

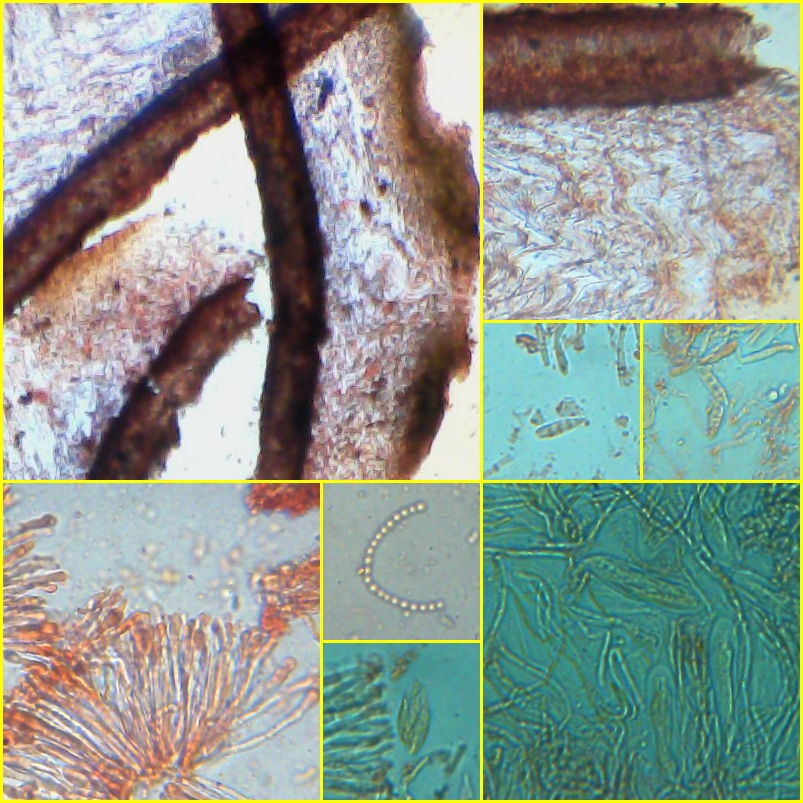
Based on microscopic features: Spores are hyaline, 3-septate, with average measurement of 15–34 x 6.5–8.5 μm in size

The hymenium is colorless, 65–110 μm in height, and displays a positive iodine reaction (I+ blue). The paraphyses are simple or sparingly branched towards their apices, measuring 2–3 μm in thickness at mid-length and having 4–6.5 μm wide terminal cells. The hypothecium (Note: The dense hyphal tissue beneath the hymenium.) is yellowish to yellowish-brown and also exhibits the iodine-positive blue staining.

The asci are 8-spored, cylindrical-clavate in shape, with a strongly thickened apex containing a K/I+ pale blue apical dome and a downwardly projecting K/I+ deep blue tubular structure. The ascospores produced within these asci are (2-)3(−4)-septate, hyaline, and fusiform with acute ends, measuring 15–34 x 6.5–8.5 μm in size.

=== Pycnidia ===
Pycnidia are present on the thallus, occurring either on the lamina or along the margins, and are embedded within wart-like structures. These pycnidia are globose in shape and paler in color compared to the surrounding thallus tissue. They give rise to bacilliform (rod-shaped) conidia that are on average 6×1.25μm, often with swollen ends.

== Chemistry ==
Chemical analysis of the Enchylium polycarpon thallus has shown that it does not contain any lichen substances detectable through standard spot tests. All spot tests performed on samples of this lichen have yielded negative results.

The fungal component of the E. polycarpon symbiosis does not appear to produce any unique or characteristic secondary metabolites or other products.

The absence of specialized lichen substances suggests that E. polycarpon likely relies primarily on the photosynthetic capabilities of its cyanobacterial photobiont, Nostoc, to meet its nutritional and functional needs. Without the production of distinctive metabolites, the lichen may derive its required resources more directly from the photosynthates provided by the Nostoc cyanobacteria.

== Habitat ==
E. polycarpon exhibits a preference for substrates with a slightly basic to basic pH, with the species typically occurring on substrata with a pH of 5. This indicates the lichen tolerates and even thrives in environments with somewhat elevated alkalinity, in contrast to many other lichen species that favor more acidic conditions.

In terms of solar irradiation, E. polycarpon is adapted to sites with moderate to very high levels of direct sunlight, occupying sun-exposed areas with solar irradiation values ranging from 4 to 5 on the 5-point scale. The lichen is able to avoid the stresses of extreme solar exposure, but nevertheless prefers habitats that receive ample direct sunlight over more shaded environments. With regard to moisture availability, E. polycarpon exhibits a xerophytic to rather xerophytic ecological profile, with an aridity value of 4 on the 5-point scale. This allows the lichen to tolerate and even thrive in moderately dry conditions, in contrast to more hygrophilic species.

Analysis of the lichen's response to eutrophication, or elevated nutrient and dust deposition, shows E. polycarpon can occupy sites ranging from those with very low levels of eutrophication (value 1) to those with moderate eutrophication (value 3) on the 5-point scale. However, the lichen does not appear to tolerate environments with high to very high levels of eutrophication, indicating a susceptibility to excessive anthropogenic enrichment of its substrate.

In terms of its response to human disturbance, E. polycarpon is classified as a species that occurs predominantly in natural or semi-natural habitats, with a poleotolerance value of 1 to 2 on the 4-class scale. This indicates the lichen prefers relatively undisturbed environmental conditions and may serve as an indicator of habitat quality and ecological continuity.

Regarding altitudinal distribution, chemical and distribution analysis shows that E. polycarpon is found primarily in the eu-Mediterranean, submediterranean, and montane vegetation belts, with an altitudinal range of 1 to 3 on the 6-point scale. The lichen does not appear to extend its range into the higher-elevation oroboreal, alpine, or nival zones of mountainous regions.

== Distribution ==
=== Collema polycarpon ===
Collema polycarpon has been documented in localities across Europe, North America, and western Asia over past centuries.

The 1800–1899 period saw observations reported from additional Scandinavian regions, with collections made in Öland and Härjedalen provinces of Sweden as well as in Norway. Into the 1900s, documentation expanded across parts of Northern and Central Europe. Repeat localities in Sweden included Gotland, Öland, and Östergötland provinces. The Abisko area of northern Sweden and Raudekfjället in neighboring Norway also hosted C. polycarpon observations.

Records since 2000 document observations from the provinces of Ontario and Manitoba in Canada, as well as from sites in central Texas, United States. C. polycarpon continues to be reported from its stronghold areas in Scandinavia as well, with continued observations from sites on Gotland and the Manitoulin and Kawartha Lakes districts of Ontario, Canada.

Frequent habitats of C. polycarpon included dolomitic and limestone rocks, as well as leaf humus in mixed forests.

=== Enchylium polycarpon ===
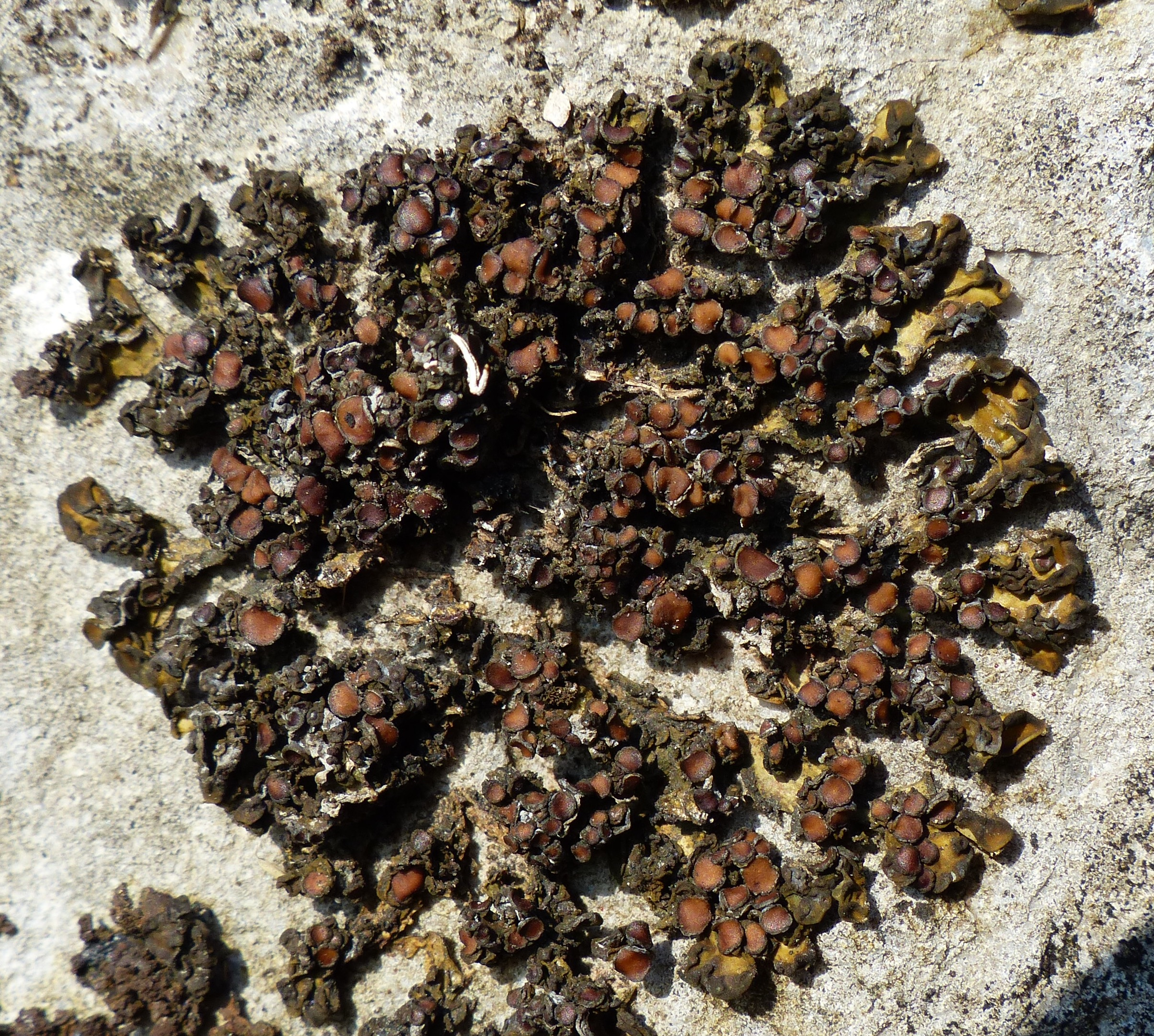
Enchylium polycarpon found on calcareous rock in Italy, Friuli-Venezia Giulia, Trieste, Trieste Karst, Rocca di Monrupino.

Enchylium polycarpon has a widespread global distribution, with records spanning across multiple continents. The species is known to occur in various regions of North America, Europe, Africa, and Asia.

In North America, E. polycarpon has been documented in several states within the western United States, including Arizona, California, Colorado, Iowa, Minnesota, Montana, Wisconsin, and Wyoming. The species has also been reported from the Canadian provinces of Alberta, British Columbia, Labrador, Northwest Territories, Ontario, Quebec, and Saskatchewan. Further south, it has been recorded in the Mexican state of Chihuahua.

Across the Atlantic, E. polycarpon has widespread distribution throughout Europe. Within the continent, the species has been reported from numerous countries, including Italy, France, Ireland, and the Czech Republic. In Italy, it has been observed in various regions such as Friuli-Venezia Giulia, Sardinia, Campania, Apulia, Calabria, and Sicily. France and Ireland also host populations of this lichen species. According to the Atlas of Czech Lichens, in the Czech Republic, E. polycarpon is "linked to karst areas and occurs only locally." Beyond Europe, Enchylium polycarpon has been documented in parts of northern Africa. The species has also been recorded in eastern and southern Africa, including South Africa. In Asia, the lichen has been found in India.

Regarding the habitat preferences of E. polycarpon, the species typically grows on hard, usually calcareous rock substrates in exposed and periodically wet microhabitats. While the lichen has been observed on both acidic and basic rock types, it appears to have a preference for calcareous substrates. In rare instances, E. polycarpon has been found on siliceous (sandstone) rocks in Italy, and on volcanic rock at Lake Clark National Park and Preserve in Alaska. E. polycarpon is often found in association with other members of the Collemataceae family, such as Enchylium multipartitum.

=== Commonness-rarity ===
E. polycarpon exhibits a varied distribution and commonness across different biogeographic belts and regions in Europe.

In the higher elevational zones, the species is reported to be absent from the Alpine and Subalpine belts. Similarly, it is absent from the Oromediterranean belt, which covers the higher mountain areas of the Mediterranean region.

Descending to the Montane belt, E. polycarpon becomes extremely rare. However, as elevations decrease further, the species becomes more prevalent, though still considered rare, in the Submediterranean belt.

Within the Padanian area, which encompasses the southern side of the Alps and the Po River Valley in northern Italy, the lichen is documented to be very rare. In the Humid Submediterranean and Humid Mediterranean belts, E. polycarpon is reported to be rather rare in its distribution. Finally, in the Dry Mediterranean belt, which includes the southern parts of the Mediterranean region, the species is considered rare.

== Conservation status ==
The conservation status of Enchylium polycarpon varies significantly across its global and regional distributions. At the global level, the species is listed as GNR, meaning its overall conservation status is unranked by NatureServe.

=== North America ===
In Canada, E. polycarpon has a national status of N4N5, indicating the species is generally common to very common nationwide. However, the provincial and territorial-level assessments reveal a more complex picture. In the Northwest Territories and Ontario, the species is considered imperiled to vulnerable, with an S2S3 ranking. The status is slightly better in Alberta, where it is ranked as S3S4, making it vulnerable to apparently secure. Populations in British Columbia are apparently secure (S4), while the Yukon Territory hosts even more secure populations, with an S4S5 status. The status remains unranked (SNR) in Quebec and Saskatchewan, and unresolved (SU) in Labrador.

Across the border in the United States, the national status for E. polycarpon is listed as unranked (NNR). At the state level, the species is considered imperiled (S2) in Montana, possibly extirpated (SH) in Iowa and Wisconsin, and unranked (SNR) in Colorado, Georgia, Minnesota, and Wyoming.

According to the Government of Northwest Territories, E. polycarpon is considered a 'Sensitive' species in the territory, meaning inventory is needed to determine its precise status. The species is ranked as S2S3, or potentially imperiled to vulnerable within the territory.

=== Europe ===
In Europe, conservation assessments have found that E. polycarpon is at a higher risk in this region. In the Czech Republic, E. polycarpon has been evaluated as Vulnerable (VU) on the 2010 Red List and Endangered (C3) on the 2023 Red List. The situation is similar in Finland, where the species is listed as Near Threatened (NT) on the 2019 and 2010 regional Red Lists, having previously been assessed as Least Concern (LC) in 2000. It is also considered a regionally threatened species in several biogeographic regions of Finland.

In Great Britain and Ireland, E. polycarpon has been assessed as of Least Concern by Woods & Coppins (2012) but is listed as Nationally Scarce due to the paucity of records, suggesting it may be under-reported in this region.
