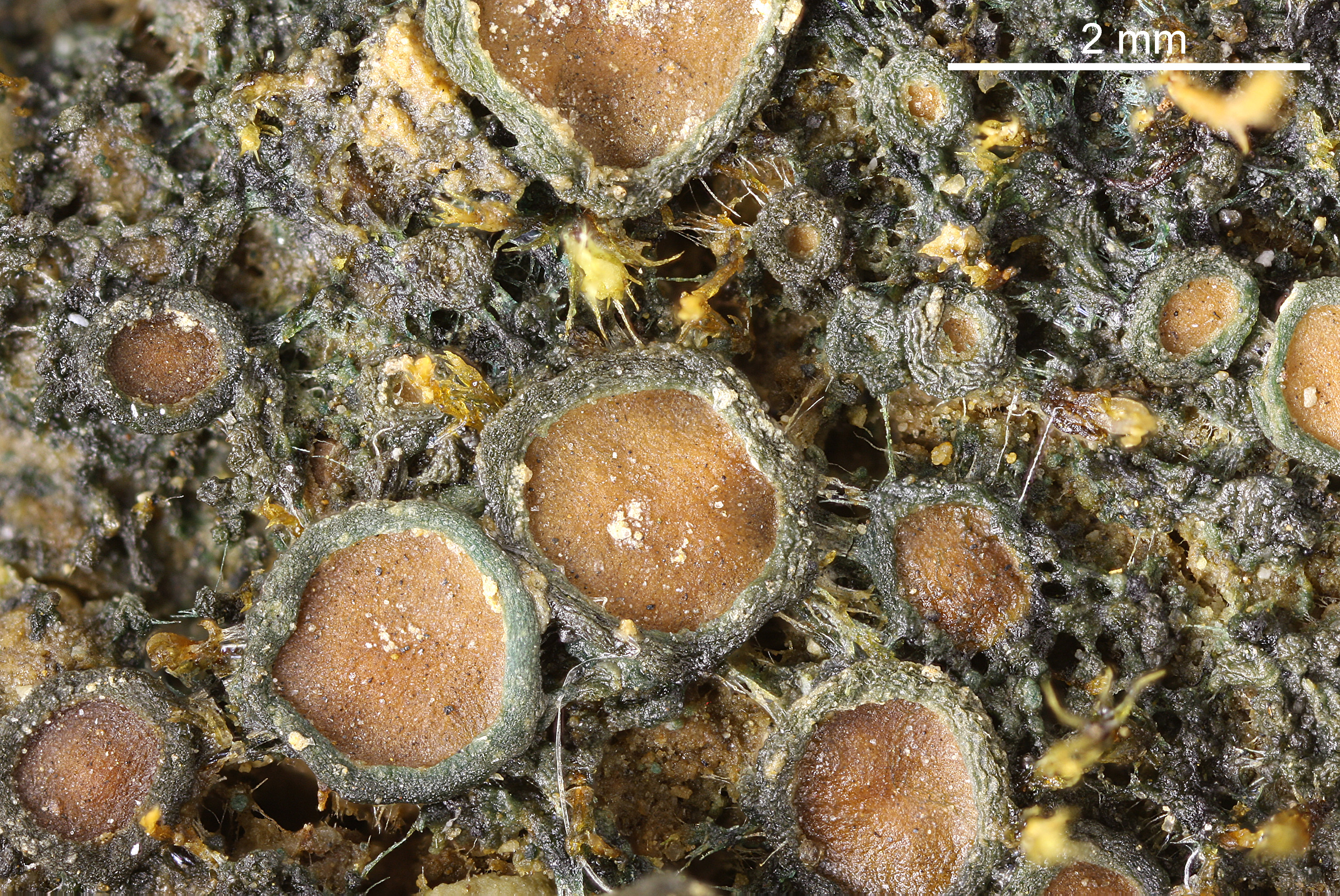

Conservation status
- Unranked (NatureServe)

Scientific classification
- Kingdom: Fungi
- Division: Ascomycota
- Class: Lecanoromycetes
- Order: Peltigerales
- Family: Collemataceae
- Genus: Enchylium
- Species: E. limosum

Binomial name
- Enchylium limosum (Ach.) Otálora, P.M. Jørg. & Wedin (2013)

Synonyms
- Collema cheileum var. glaucescens (Hoffm., 1904) Elenkin, 1904; Collema glaucescens (Hoffm., 1796 [1795]); Collema glaucescens var. limosum (Ach., 1850) Flot., 1850; Collema limosum (Ach., 1810) Ach., 1810; Collema pulposum subsp. limosum (Ach., 1882) Tuck., 1882; Collema pulposum var. limosum (Ach., 1861) Mudd, 1861; Eucollema glaucescens (Hoffm., 1912) Horw., 1912; Gabura limosa (Ach., 1891) Kuntze, 1891; Lichen crispus limosum (Ach., 1813) Lam., 1813; Lichen limosus (Ach., 1799 [1798]); Parmelia limosa (Ach., 1803) Ach., 1803

= Enchylium limosum =

Species of lichen

Enchylium limosum, commonly known as lime-loving tarpaper lichen, is a species of crustose to subfoliose lichen in the family Collemataceae. This unique lichen species possesses a gelatinous thallus with a dark coloration, contributing to its distinctive appearance. It thrives in a diverse array of habitats spanning temperate to boreal-montane regions, across Europe, North America, Africa, and Asia.

The ecological preferences of E. limosum include a notable affinity for calcareous soils. Such soils contain calcium carbonate or lime, hence the species' common name of "lime-loving". This characteristic often leads to its colonizing environments disrupted by human activity. Habitats such as quarries and spoil heaps frequently host populations of this lichen. Despite its extensive geographical distribution, E. limosum is often underestimated and overlooked, particularly in Alpine regions where its occurrence is sporadic.

The conservation status of E. limosum presents a nuanced picture that varies across different regions. In some areas, it is designated as vulnerable or critically imperiled due to threats such as habitat loss and disturbance.

E. limosum has undergone several taxonomic revisions. Originally described by Swedish botanist Erik Acharius in 1799 as Lichen limosus, it was reassigned by various taxonomists, and received its current accepted name Enchylium limosum in 2013 by Mónica Andrea García Otálora, Per Magnus Jørgensen, & Mats Wedin. Synonyms for it have included Collema forissii Szatala, Collema glaucescens Hoffm., Collema viscosum A. Massal., and others.

== Systematics ==
=== Etymology ===
The species Enchylium limosum, commonly known as lime-loving tarpaper lichen, derives its name from its original classification as Collema limosum, attributed to the Swedish botanist Erik Acharius. The specific epithet "limosum" is derived from the Latin word "limosus", meaning "full of mud" or "slime", which aptly describes the dark, wet thallus characteristic of this lichen.

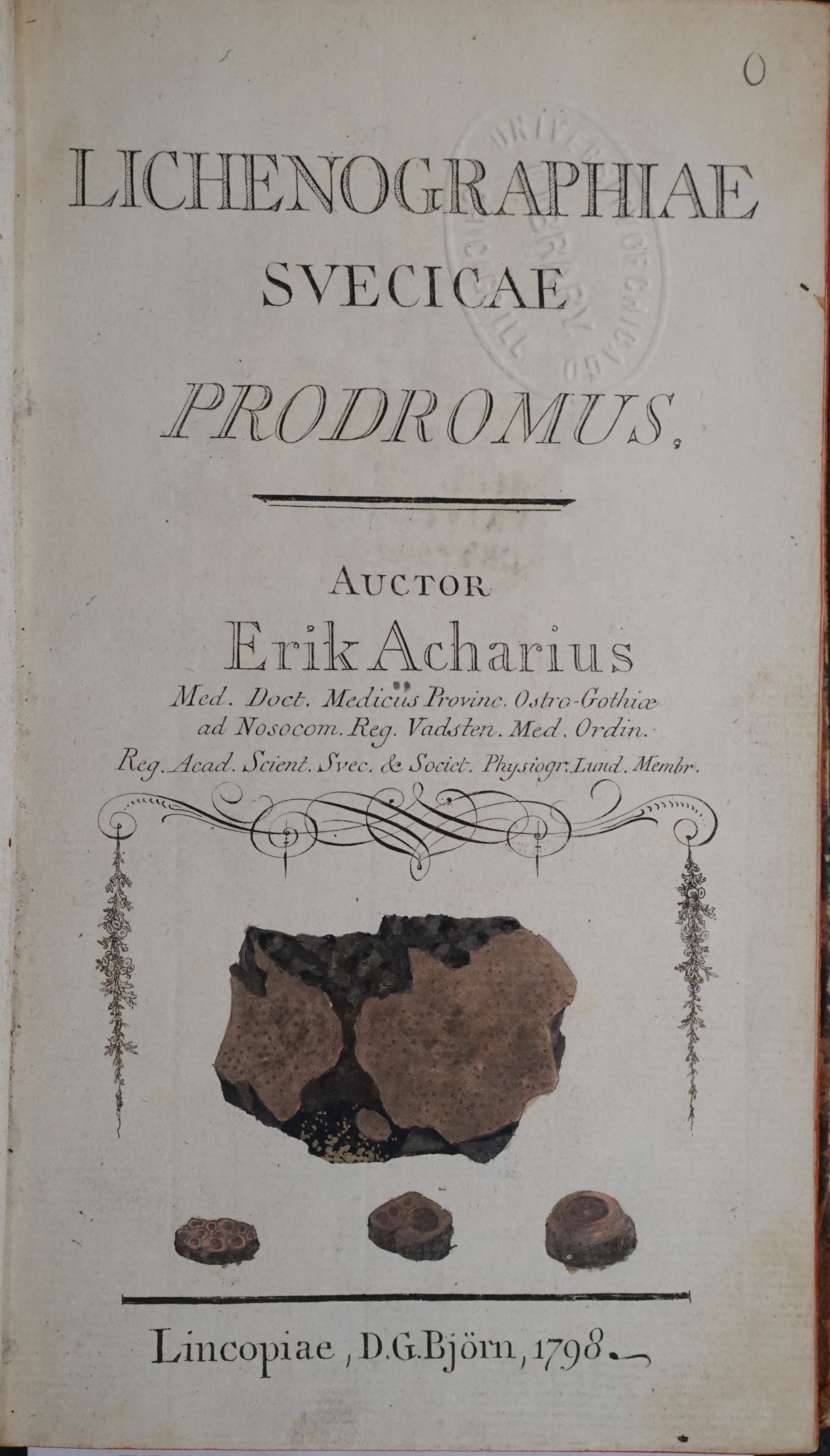
Title page of Erik Acharius's first work Lichenographia svecicae Prodromus (1798).

=== Taxonomy ===
Enchylium limosum was originally described by Swedish botanist Erik Acharius in 1799 under the name Lichen limosus in "Lichenogr. Suec. Prodr." Throughout its taxonomic history, E. limosum has undergone several changes in nomenclature. Originally described by Ach. in 1799 as Lichen limosus, it was later reassigned by Ach. in 1810 as Collema limosum in "Lich. Univ." Subsequent taxonomic revisions led to further adjustments, such as its classification as Collema glaucescens var. limosum by German lichenologist Julius von Flotow in 1850 and Collema pulposum var. limosum by British lichenologist William Mudd in 1861.

In 1891, German botanist Kuntze (1843–1907) identified it as Gabura limosa in "Revis. gen. pl.," followed by its recognition as Collema cheileum var. glaucescens by Russian lichenologist Elenkin in 1904. British lichenologist Arthur Reginald Horwood further reassigned it as Eucollema glaucescens in 1912.

In 2013, Mónica Andrea García Otálora, Per Magnus Jørgensen, & Mats Wedin proposed its current accepted name, Enchylium limosum. This taxonomic revision was published in the journal "Fungal Diversity" in 2014.

=== Synonymy ===
Enchylium limosum has undergone several taxonomic revisions, so it is found under a number of different names in scientific literature. These synonyms include Collema forissii Szatala, Collema glaucescens Hoffm., Collema viscosum A. Massal., Collema limosum (Ach.) Ach., Collema pulposum var. limosum (Ach.) Mudd, Eucollema glaucescens (Hoffm.) Horw., Gabura limosa (Ach.) Kuntze, Lichen crispus limosum (Ach.) Lam., Lichen limosus Ach., and Parmelia limosa (Ach.) Ach.

== Description ==
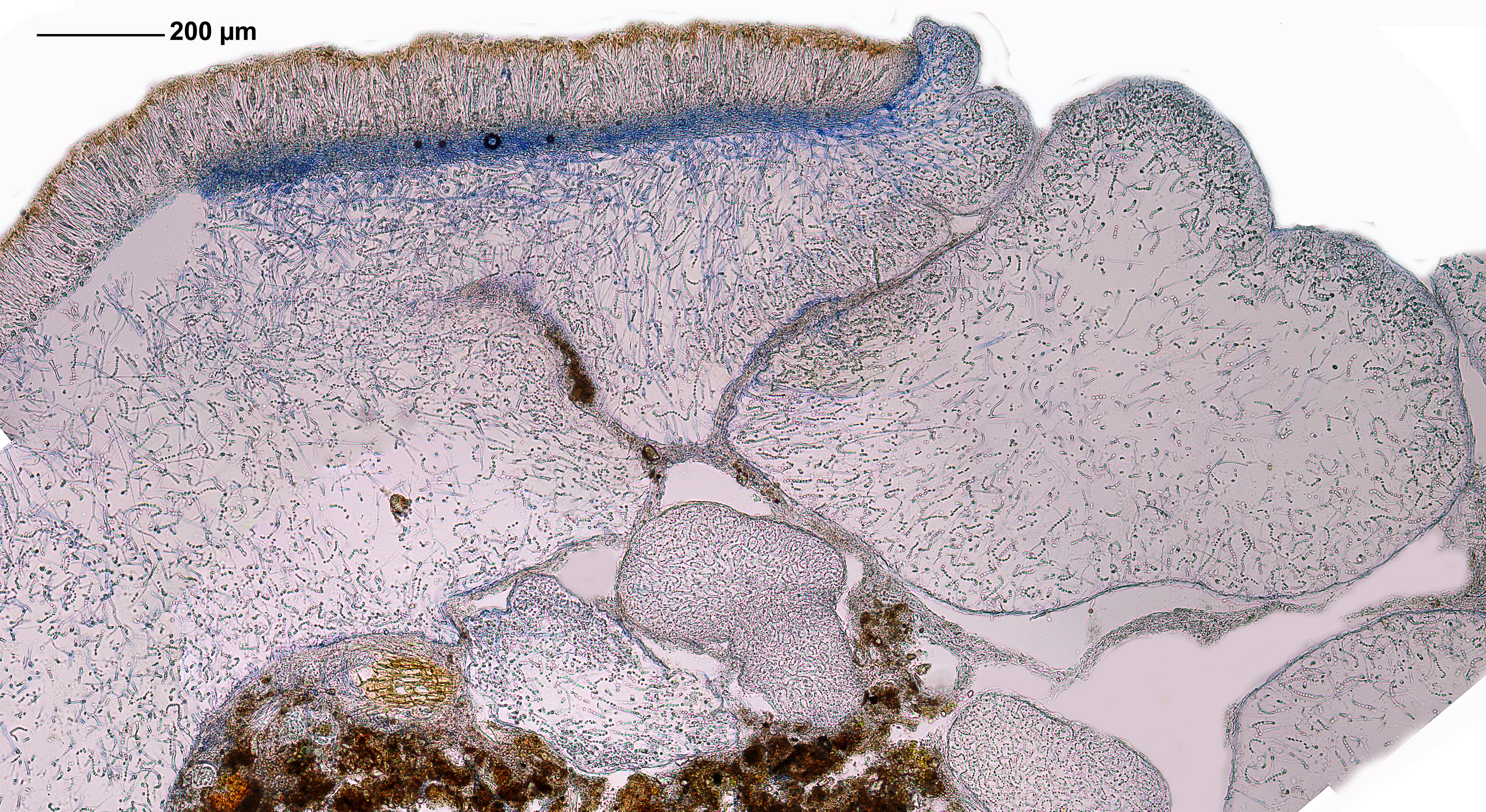
Microscopic view of an Enchylium limosum specimen captured in Kreis Reutlingen, Baden-Württemberg, Germany.

Enchylium limosum is a diminutive crustose to subfoliose lichen species that forms a delicate, gelatinous thallus ranging from 100 to 500 micrometers in thickness when fully hydrated. The thallus has a distinctive dark olive-green to brownish-black coloration and a textural appearance that can vary from granulose to membranous. While the thalline margins are often indistinctly lobed, the lichen's vegetative structure is typically best developed in the areas surrounding the apothecia. E. limosum does not have an upper or a lower cortical layer.

The apothecia of E. limosum are profuse, lecanorine in structure, and sessile, measuring 1 to 3 millimeters in diameter, occasionally reaching up to 4 millimeters. The apothecial disc displays a flat to convex topography, ranging in color from reddish-brown to dark brown-black, and is bordered by a thick, often verrucose or lobulate thalline margin. Microscopically, the thalline exciple is either ecorticate (Note: Not having a cortex.) or only pseudocorticate in the basal regions, while the proper exciple is poorly developed, composed of euthyplectenchymatous (elongated) or, more rarely, subparaplectenchymatous hyphae, and reaches up to 40 micrometers in lateral width.

The hymenium of E. limosum is colorless, measuring 80 to 120 micrometers in height, and exhibits a positive reaction to iodine staining (I+ blue). The paraphyses are simple or sparsely branched in their upper portions, 1.5 to 2 micrometers thick at the mid-level, and terminate in clavate to subglobose apical cells that are 3 to 4.5 micrometers wide. The hypothecium (Note: The dense hyphal tissue beneath the hymenium.) ranges from colorless to pale yellow in appearance.

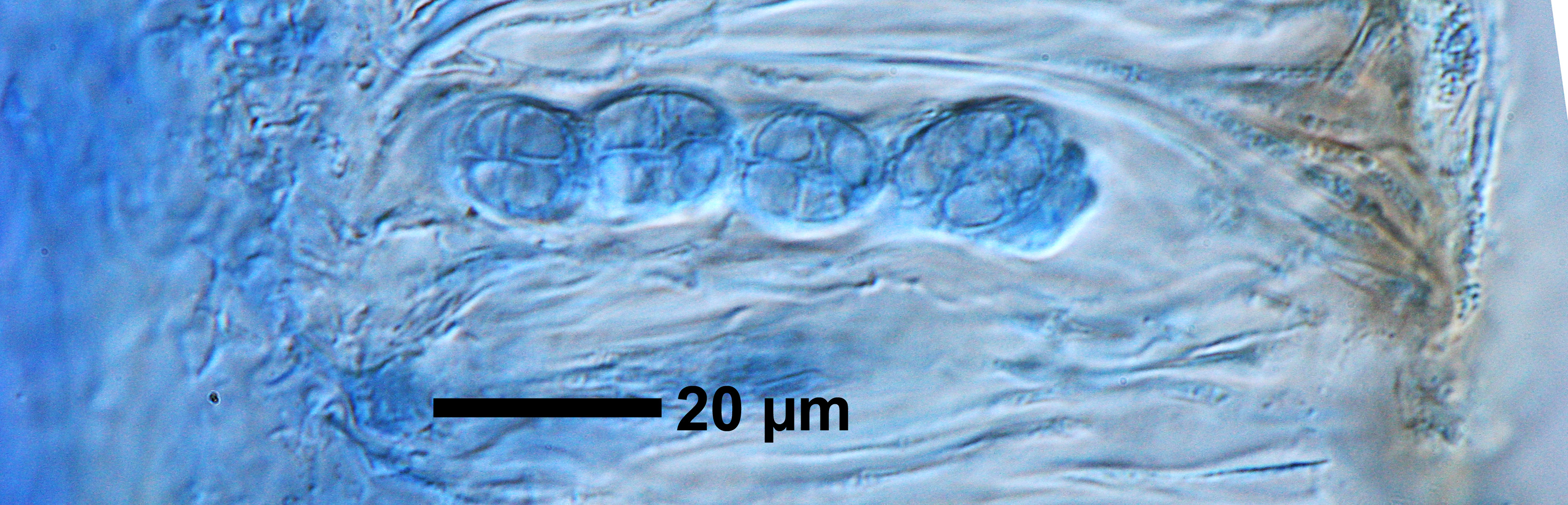
There are 4 ascospores in each ascus of Enchylium limosum.

The asci of E. limosum are cylindrical-clavate in shape, containing (2-) 4 spores, with a distinctly thickened apex and a downwardly projecting, deeply blue-staining (K/I+) tubular structure. The ascospores themselves are muriform or submuriform, possessing 3 to 5 transverse septa and 1 to 2 longitudinal septa, hyaline in color, and ellipsoid to subovoid in shape with obtuse to rarely subacute ends, measuring (20-) 25 to 35 (−40) micrometers in length and (8-) 10 to 15 (−17) micrometers in width. The ascospores of E. limosum are around 30 micrometers in length.

Pycnidia, when present, are infrequent, either immersed or slightly projecting, appearing as small reddish dots, and produce straight, bacilliform conidia that are 4 to 6 micrometers long and 1 to 1.8 micrometers wide. The photobiont of E. limosum is a cyanobacterium, specifically Nostoc, with the cells arranged in elongated chains. All spot tests conducted on this lichen species yield negative results, and no secondary metabolites have been detected.

E. limosum is considered a diminutive lichen species, characterized by its crustose thallus that is often more developed in the areas surrounding the relatively large and conspicuous apothecia, which contain 4-spored asci. E. limosum is recognized as a typical pioneer species, commonly colonizing bare, often calcareous soils, including anthropogenic habitats such as quarries and spoil heaps, though its presence in these areas is generally temporary.

== Chemistry ==
Enchylium limosum does not contain any detectable lichen substances or secondary metabolites. E. limosum exhibits negative reactions to all standard spot tests.

The species is found on substrates with a relatively acidic pH, ranging from 3 to 4. This indicates that E. limosum favors growing on subacid to subneutral substrates, such as those found in moderately disturbed environments.

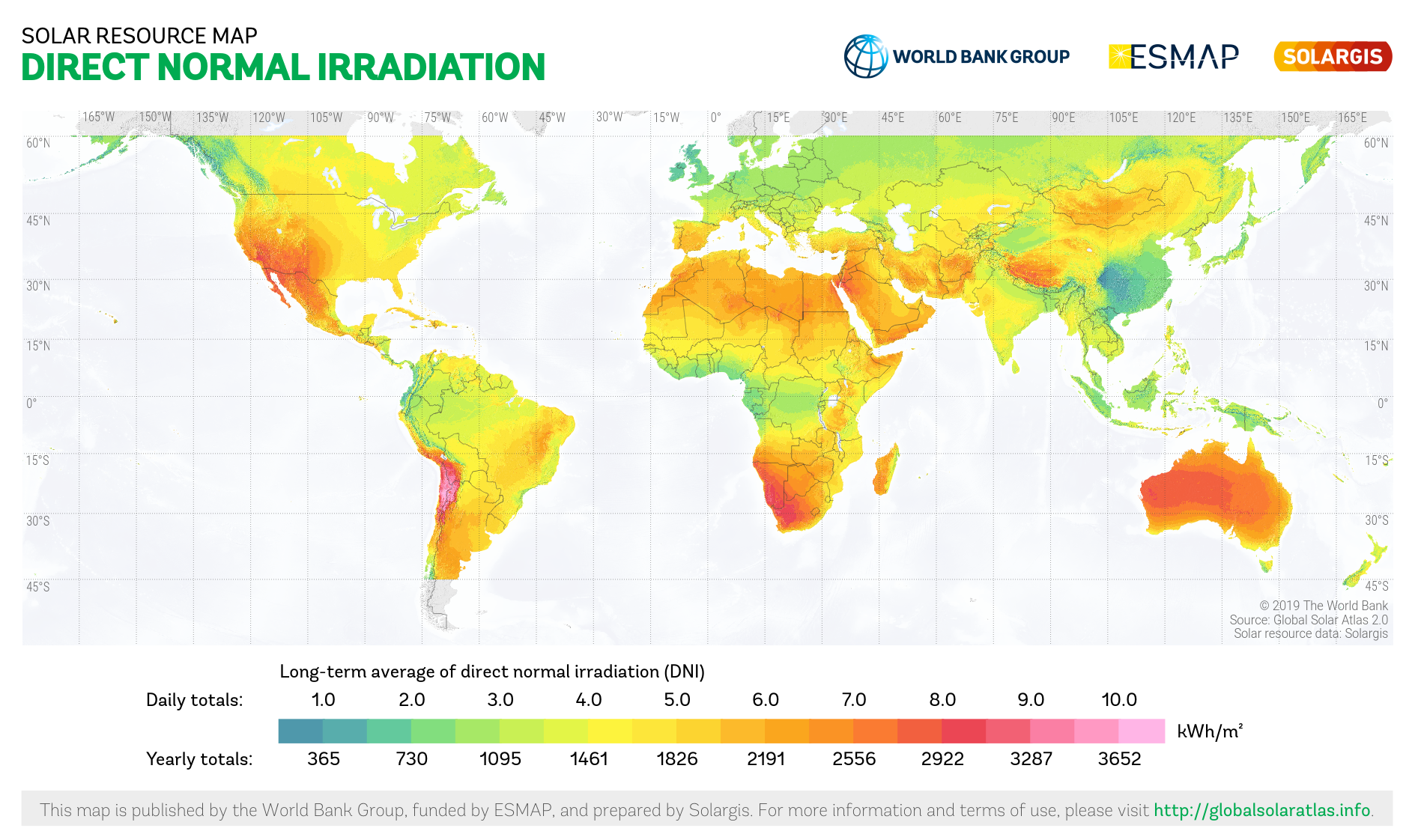
Enchylium limosum typically avoids both extremely shaded and highly sun-exposed situations.

In terms of solar irradiation, E. limosum prefers sites with plenty of diffuse light but limited direct solar exposure, scoring a 3 on the 5-point scale. This suggests the species avoids both extremely shaded and highly sun-exposed situations.

The aridity tolerance of E. limosum is classified as mesophytic, with a value of 3 on the 5-point scale. This indicates the species can thrive in habitats with moderate moisture levels, neither too dry nor too wet.

Regarding eutrophication, E. limosum is found in areas with weak to moderate levels of nutrient enrichment, scoring 2–3 on the 5-point scale. This implies the species can tolerate some degree of environmental pollution or nutrient deposition, but likely avoids heavily eutrophicated sites.

In terms of poleotolerance, E. limosum is classified as occurring in moderately disturbed areas, with a value of 2 on the 4-point scale. This suggests the species is not exclusively found in natural or undisturbed habitats but can also colonize semi-natural environments with some level of human activity.

Finally, the altitudinal distribution of E. limosum spans the montane belt (value of 3) and the submediterranean belt (value of 2). This indicates the species is adapted to grow in mid-elevation habitats, typically associated with deciduous Quercus-Carpinus forests and Fagus-dominated stands.

== Distribution and habitat ==
Enchylium limosum is a widely distributed lichen species with a holarctic range, occurring across temperate to boreal-montane regions of Europe, North America, Africa, and Asia. Within Europe, the species has been recorded from a number of countries, including Italy, the United Kingdom, Ireland, the Czech Republic, Austria, Switzerland, and France. E. limosum and similar species thrive in environments where calcium-rich minerals are present, such as limestone or dolomitic rocks.

Regarding its specific distribution within Europe, E. limosum has been documented in the following regions and localities:

=== Italy ===
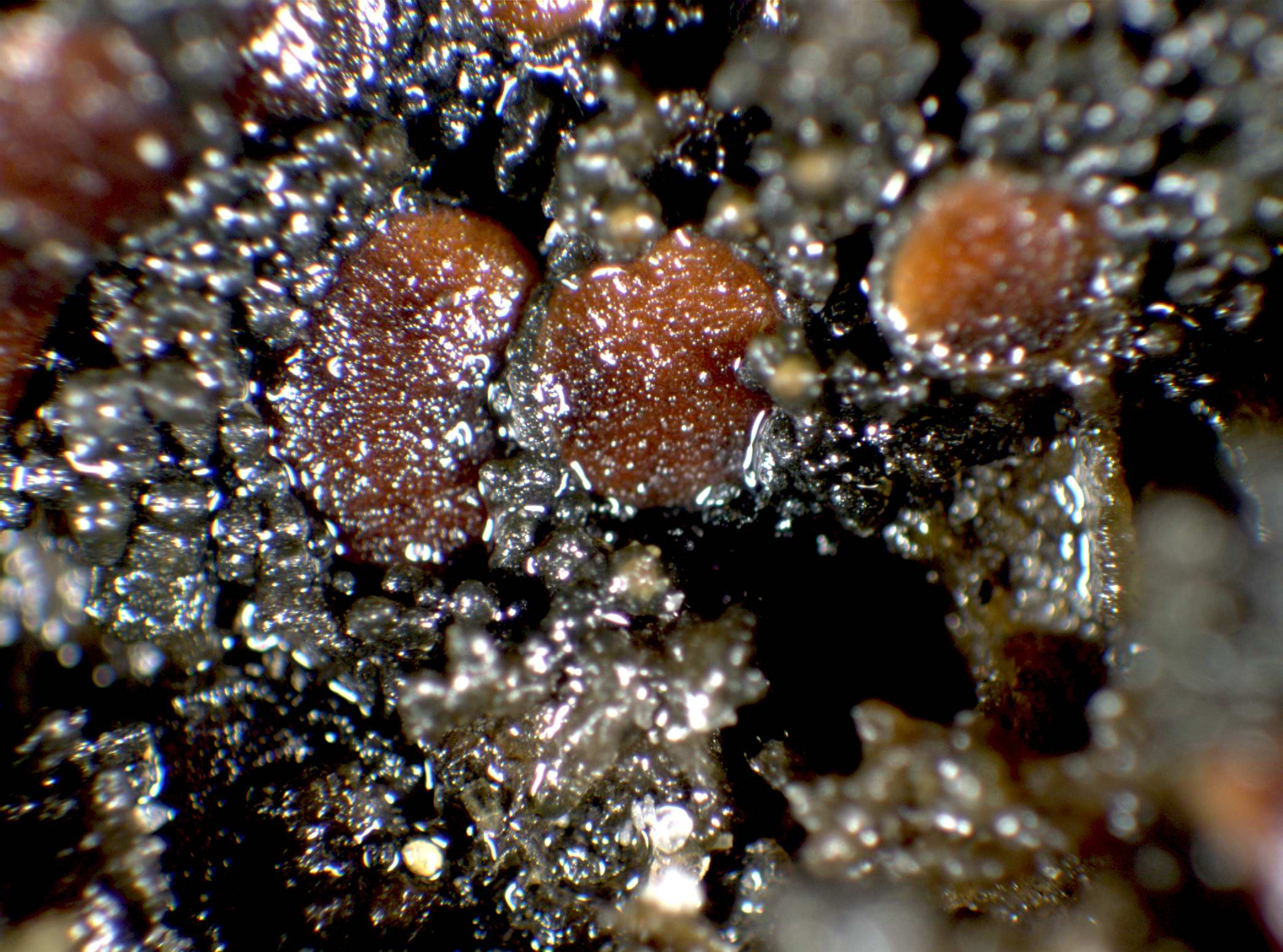
Hydrated Enchylium limosum in Italy. Specimen photo preserved at the Herbarium of Department of Life Sciences, University of Trieste.

Enchylium limosum have a limited distribution within Italy, with the majority of known populations located in the southern regions of the country. The species seems to thrive primarily in the montane and submediterranean belts, with isolated occurrences recorded in Calabria, Campania, and Sardinia.

In Calabria, a single population of E. limosum has been documented in the Tarsia al Lago locality, situated within the montane belt. Similarly, in the Campania region, the species has been found in the Monti di Castellammare area, which falls within the submediterranean ecological zone.

The island of Sardinia also plays host to a known occurrence of E. limosum, with a population recorded along the western coast near the town of Buggerru, again within the submediterranean belt.

=== United Kingdom ===
In the United Kingdom and Ireland, the species is considered locally distributed but widely scattered, with records from damp clay soils and exposed, soft coastal cliff faces.

=== Czech Republic ===
In the Czech Republic, E. limosum occurs abundantly throughout the country, with habitats being quarries, spoil heaps, and setting pits.

=== Outside Europe ===
Outside of Europe, this lichen has been recorded in the Canadian provinces of British Columbia, Manitoba, Nova Scotia, Northwest Territories, Nunavut, Ontario, Prince Edward Island, and Quebec, as well as the U.S. state of Minnesota. In the Canadian North, E. limosum has been documented in the Southern Arctic and Taiga Plains ecozones, typically growing on calcareous soils.

=== Ecology ===
Ecologically, Enchylium limosum is considered a typical pioneer species, commonly colonizing bare, often calcareous soils in disturbed habitats such as quarries, spoil heaps, and setting pits. However, its presence in these anthropogenic environments is generally temporary, as the lichen is quickly outcompeted by other vegetation.

Within its distribution range, E. limosum has been observed growing on a variety of substrates, including mineral, clay, and sandy soils, as well as on terricolous mosses and plant debris. The species appears to prefer substrates that are somewhat calcareous in nature. Altitudinally, it has been recorded from the mesomediterranean belt, where the potential vegetation is dominated by evergreen broad-leaved forests with Quercus ilex, up to the montane belt, where deciduous forests with Fagus sylvatica and closed coniferous forests with Picea abies are the predominant vegetation types. Despite its wide distribution, E. limosum is generally considered an overlooked and uncommon lichen species, particularly in the Alps region.

=== Commonness and rarity ===
Enchylium limosum is completely absent from the alpine belt, subalpine belt, oromediterranean belt, Padanian area, and dry mediterranean belt. In the montane belt, the species is extremely rare, with only a few known populations. Enchylium limosum is also extremely rare in the submediterranean belt. The species is very rare in the humid submediterranean belt and the humid mediterranean belt, with just a handful of recorded occurrences in these regions.

== Conservation status ==
The conservation status of the lichen species Enchylium limosum varies considerably across its known geographic range, with limited and sometimes conflicting assessments available.

=== Global status ===
At the global level, the species' conservation status has not been comprehensively evaluated, and it is currently listed as Not Ranked (GNR) by NatureServe.

=== Canada ===
In Canada, Enchylium limosum's status differs significantly between provinces and territories. According to NatureServe, it is considered Critically Imperiled (S1?) in Nova Scotia, Vulnerable (S3) in British Columbia and Ontario, and Unranked (SNR) in Prince Edward Island and Quebec. The species' status is also listed as Unresolved (SU) in Manitoba, Northwest Territories, and Nunavut.

In the Northwest Territories of Canada, the General Status Rank for E. limosum is Undetermined, with a status rank of SU, indicating that further inventory and assessment are required to determine its conservation status. E. limosum has been designated as S1 (Critically imperiled) by Atlantic Canada Conservation Data Centre.

=== United States ===
Across the border in the United States, the national status of Enchylium limosum is Unranked (NNR), and it is also Unranked (SNR) in the only state for which data is available, Minnesota. Minnesota Department of Natural Resources have listed E. limosum in their "Plant and Fungi watchlist" due the species' recent decline in the state.

=== United Kingdom ===
Conversely, in Great Britain, the species is assessed as Least Concern (LC) according to the NBN Atlas Partnership and the British Lichen Society, suggesting it is not currently considered a conservation priority in that region.

=== Finland ===
According to the Finnish Biodiversity Information Facility, Enchylium limosum has been assessed for inclusion in the Red List of Finnish Species on multiple occasions. In the most recent assessment, conducted in 2019, the species was categorized as Vulnerable (VU). The main criteria that led to this categorization were related to the species' small population size (D1).

The key threats identified for E. limosum in Finland include:

- Overgrowing of meadows and other open habitats (N)
- Construction and development on the land (R)
- Other known reasons (Muu)
- Threats caused by alien species (Vie)

Prior to the 2019 assessment, E. limosum had also been evaluated in previous Red List assessments for Finland:

In the 2010 Red List, the species was again categorized as Vulnerable (VU). However, in the earlier 2000 Red List assessment, E. limosum was listed as Not Evaluated (NE), indicating that a comprehensive conservation status evaluation had not been conducted at that time.

=== Others ===
The 2019 Red List of Estonian lichens designates E. limosum as a Vulnerable (VU) species in the region. In the Czech Republic, E. limosum was previously categorized as Near Threatened (NT) by Institute of Botany of the Czech Academy of Sciences . However, a more recent assessment has elevated the species to the Endangered (C3) category.
