= Finkia =

Scientific classification
- Domain: Eukaryota
- Kingdom: Fungi
- Division: Ascomycota
- Class: Lichinomycetes
- Order: Lichinales
- Family: Lichinaceae
- Genus: Finkia; Vain.

Type species
- Finkia portoricensis Vain.

Genus of fungi

Finkia is a genus of fungi within the family Lichinaceae. This is a monotypic genus, containing the single species Finkia portoricensis. It is found in Puerto Rico.

The genus name of Finkia is in honour of Bruce Fink (1861 – 1927), who was a prominent American lichenologist.

The genus was circumscribed by Edvard August Vainio in Mycologia Vol.21 on page 34 in 1929.
