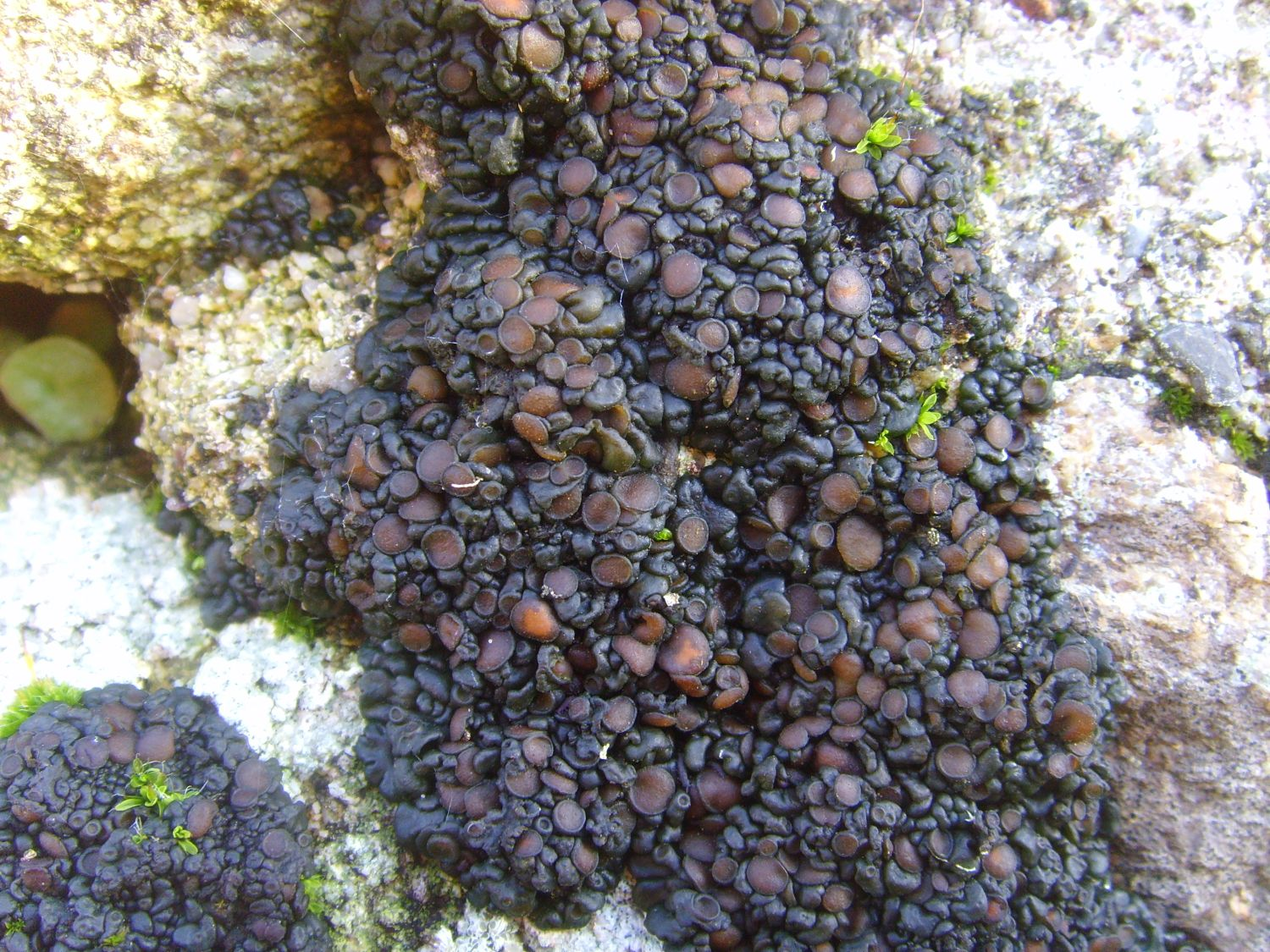

Conservation status
- Apparently Secure (NatureServe)

Scientific classification
- Kingdom: Fungi
- Division: Ascomycota
- Class: Lecanoromycetes
- Order: Peltigerales
- Family: Collemataceae
- Genus: Enchylium
- Species: E. tenax

Binomial name
- Enchylium tenax (Sw.) Gray

Synonyms
- Collema tenax (Sw.) Ach.

= Enchylium tenax =

Species of lichenised fungi in the family Collemataceae

Enchylium tenax is a species of lichen known by the common names jelly lichen, black lichen, and desert lichen. It occurs in Arctic and temperate regions in the Northern Hemisphere. It is very common in North America, and it is present in Europe, Asia, and Africa.

This lichen has a thick black or dark green gelatinous thallus which is variable in size. It is generally 1 to 3 centimeters wide. It contains a symbiont, the cyanobacterium Nostoc commune. It reproduces when pieces of the thallus break off, or when isidia, soredia, and apothecia are produced. It is tolerant of desiccation, shrinking when dry and swelling up when water is present.

This lichen is terricolous, growing on the soil surface. It is an indicator of basic soils, and is often found on gypsum-rich and other calcareous soils. It is a common component of cryptobiotic soil crusts, for example, in the dry regions of the western United States. It fixes nitrogen, increasing the nitrogen levels in the soil.
