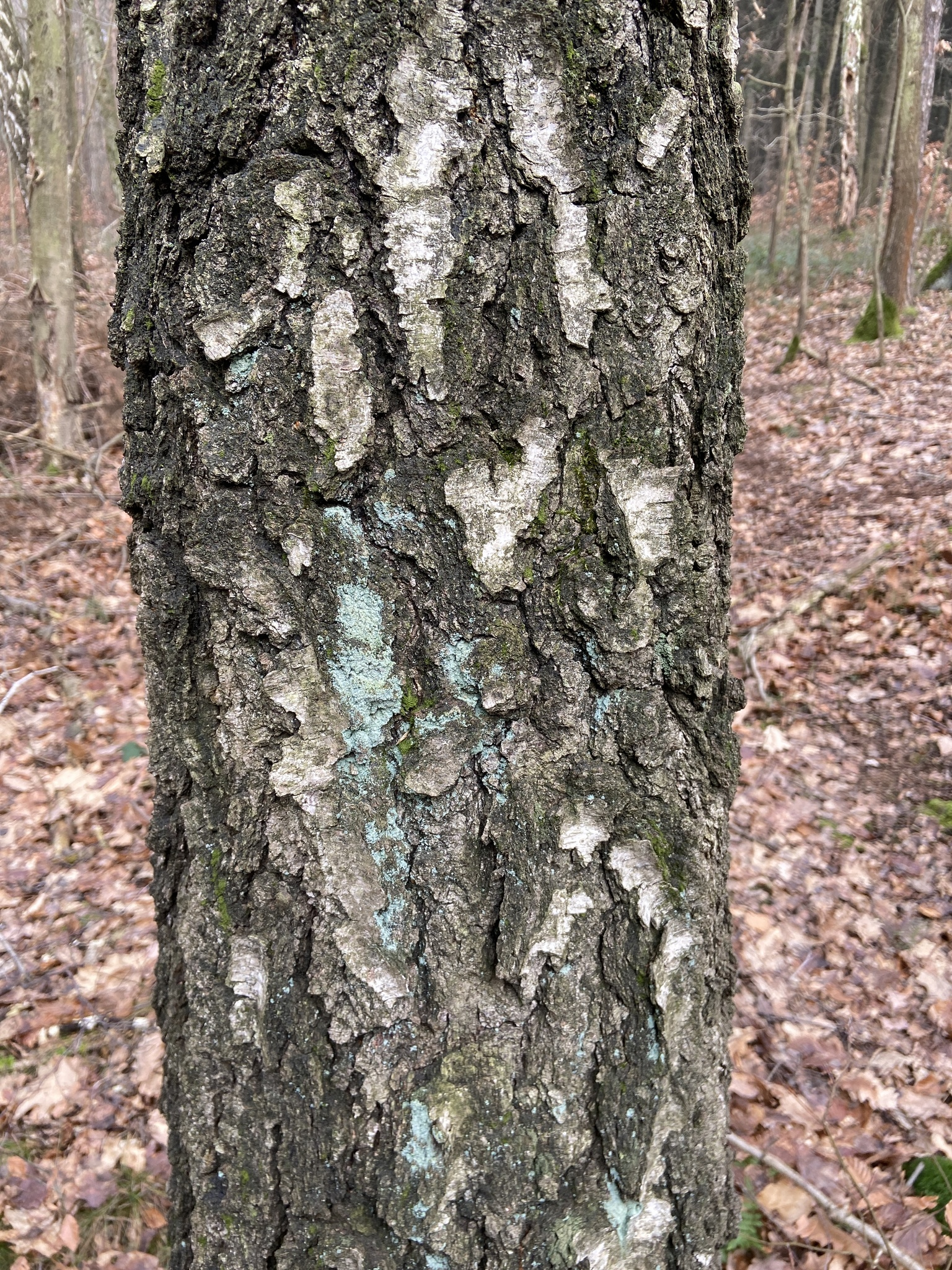

Conservation status
- Secure (NatureServe)

Scientific classification
- Kingdom: Fungi
- Division: Ascomycota
- Class: Lecanoromycetes
- Order: Lecanorales
- Family: Stereocaulaceae
- Genus: Lepraria
- Species: L. finkii

Binomial name
- Lepraria finkii (de Lesd.) R.C.Harris, 1981

Synonyms
- Crocynia aliciae Hue; Crocynia americana de Lesd. ex Hue; Crocynia andrewii de Lesd.; Crocynia finkii de Lesd. ex Hue, 1924; Crocynia finkii Hue, 1985; Crocynia mollissima de Lesd.; Lepraria aeruginosa sensu auct. brit. p.p., 2002; Leproloma lobificans (Nyl.) Boistel

= Lepraria finkii =

Species of lichen

Lepraria finkii, or Bruce's Lucky Dust, is a type of lichen in the genus Lepraria. Its colours range from a greenish-gray to a bluish-green. The organism is generally found everywhere in the world, but more commonly found in tropical areas; it can be spotted in shaded areas on tree trunks, overtaking bryophytes, in soil banks, and in dry niches. It's named in honor of lichenologist Bruce Fink.
