= Bruce Fink =

American lichenologist (1861-1927)

- Born: December 22, 1861; Blackberry, Illinois, U.S.
- Died: July 10, 1927 (aged 65)
- Education: University of Illinois (BS, MS); Harvard University (MA)
- Occupation: Lichenologist
- Spouse: Ida May Hammond
- Children: 3

Bruce Fink (December 22, 1861 – July 10, 1927) was an American lichenologist. His name was synonymous with the field of botany in the United States for more than 30 years. Although educated and well-versed across the spectrum of botany, Fink focused his passion on lichenology, publishing more than 100 research papers, reviews, notes and monographs. With a specialty in taxonomy, Fink’s contributions to the field of lichenology was in the realm of identifying the relationship, classification and distribution of lichens. He had a broad interest in fungi, particularly ascomycetes. Several lichens have been named in his honor, including the species Calosphaeria finkii, Lepraria finkii , Dermatina finkii, Patellaria finkii, and the genus Finkia.

== Early life and education ==
Fink was born in Blackberry, Illinois on December 22, 1861 to Reuben and Mary Elizabeth Fink. He received his primary and secondary education in Blackberry. Fink earned a Bachelor of Science degree in 1887 and a Master of Science degree in 1894 from the University of Illinois. It was during his time at the University of Illinois that Fink made the acquaintance of two professors who inspired him to pursue natural history. Fink went on to do his graduate work at Harvard University, where he received a Master of Arts degree in 1896. While at Harvard, Fink was the Townsend Scholar. Harvard brought him into contact with another great influencer, an expert and leading authority at the time in the field of lichens. This and other contacts not only propelled Fink to ultimately deliver his own contributions to the field of botany, but also opened the door for him to obtain his first two teaching jobs.

== Career ==
Fink began his teaching profession at Upper Iowa University in 1892 as Professor of Botany. In 1903 he was recruited to become Professor of Botany at Grinnell College where he remained for three years. In 1906, Fink accepted the call from Miami University to head up the Department of Botany. He remained at the University until his death in 1927.

Fink's earliest research paper was published in 1896. The topic was "Pollination and Reproduction of Lycopersicum esculentum." At this time, his interest in lichens began to take hold, leading him to author numerous research papers on the subject. Fink was a member of numerous scientific societies, including Iowa Academy of Science (president), American Association for the Advancement of Science, Sigma Xi, and Botanical Society of America, among others, oftentimes assuming leadership positions.

Fink was never one to shy away from controversy. He was an early champion of Schwendener’s proposal that lichens were actually dual organisms, consisting of both algae and fungi. It was a very unpopular thesis in America at that time. He went on to develop and advocate a classification scheme that positioned lichens amidst the fungi that he believed were parasitic on their algal component.

Fink was not content to merely study lichen systematics and floristics, he was also absorbed with their ecology and physiology. His floristic studies are the ones for which the world now remembers him, especially his studies of Minnesota lichens and his "Lichen Flora of the United States" which was completed by his student Joyce Hedrick after his death. "Lichen Flora...", although difficult to exploit, is the only study for the United States that considers all lichen groups (1,578 species, varieties, and forms, belonging to 178 genera and 46 families).

== Views on tobacco ==
He was an opponent of tobacco and published several papers on the subject of tobacco addiction.

== Personal life ==
Bruce Fink was married to Ida May Hammond and they had three children.

== Selected publications ==
- Fink, B. (1903). "Presidential Address – Two Centuries of North American Lichenology". Proceedings of the Iowa Academy of Science. 11 (1): 11–38.
- Fink, B. (1910). "The lichens of Minnesota". Contributions from the US National Herbarium. 14: 1–269.
- Fink, B. (1918). "The distribution of fungi in Puerto Rico". Mycologia. 10 (2): 58–61. doi:10.2307/3753226. JSTOR 3753226.
- Fink, B. (1918). "A new genus and species of the Collemaceae". Mycologia. 10 (5): 235–238. doi:10.2307/3753187. JSTOR 3753187.
- Fink, B. (1927). "New species of lichens from Porto Rico – I. Graphidaceae". Mycologia. 19 (4): 206–221. doi:10.2307/3753982. JSTOR 3753982.

== See also ==
- List of mycologists
