= List of lichens named by Carl Linnaeus =

The Swedish taxonomist Carl Linnaeus described 110 lichen species in his various works between 1753 and 1774, chiefly in the first (1753) and second (1763) editions of Species Plantarum, and in later works such as Systema Naturae and Mantissa plantarum. Although Linnaeus showed much less interest in lichens than in flowering plants, he recognized their ecological role as pioneer organisms in primary ecological successions. Contrary to popular belief, he never referred to lichens as the rustici pauperrimi ("the poorest peasants") or "poor trash of nature": that phrase was introduced by Georg Franz Hoffmann in 1787 and later misattributed to Linnaeus himself.

Of the roughly 2,000 lichen species now known from northern Europe, Linnaeus recognized only about 5% in his treatments. Most of his lichen names were based on material from northern Europe, especially Sweden, with only a handful of species described from specimens collected outside Europe. His lichen accounts were usually brief, consisting of short diagnostic phrases with few details of morphology, variation or ecology when judged against modern species descriptions. Even so, the Linnaean Herbarium at the Linnean Society of London contains 324 sheets with lichens and lichen-like organisms, although not all of these represent original material available to him at the time of publication.

Many of Linnaeus's lichen names are still in use today, though now placed in genera that did not exist in his time, and his species serve as the types for several important lichen genera including Cladonia, Lecidea, Lobaria, Parmelia, Peltigera, Ramalina and Usnea. At the same time, some of his species concepts were broad by modern standards. For example, his Lichen subfuscus and Lichen geographicus each correspond to species complexes that are now divided into several segregate taxa on morphological and molecular grounds. Other Linnaean names have been formally rejected or conserved with different types to preserve prevailing usage and stabilize nomenclature.

The typification and interpretation of Linnaean lichen names has therefore required sustained effort by lichenologists, involving critical study of his specimens, publications and other historical sources to determine the correct application of each name under the International Code of Nomenclature for algae, fungi, and plants. This list assembles all 110 Linnaean names that Linnaeus intended for lichens in the modern sense, regardless of their present status. For each original Linnaean name (the basionym), it records the original year of publication, the current taxonomic status or accepted name, and the year in which the present combination was published. In the "Basionym" column, author citations are omitted because all names in the list were originally published by Linnaeus (abbreviated "L."). The treatment largely follows the typifications and interpretations of Per Magnus Jørgensen, Peter Wilfred James and Charles Edward Jarvis published in 1994, supplemented by later taxonomic revisions and by current usage in major nomenclatural databases such as MycoBank and Index Fungorum.

Lichen taxa described by Carl Linnaeus and their current names
Basionym	Year of publication	Current name / status	Authority	Year of recombination	Image
Byssus botryoides	1753	Lichenomphalia umbellifera	(L.) Redhead, Lutzoni, Moncalvo & Vilgalys	2008	
Byssus candelaris	1753	Chrysothrix candelaris	(L.) J.R.Laundon	1981	
Byssus incana	1753	Lepraria incana	(L.) Ach.	1803	
Byssus lacteus	1753	Nom. rej. (Note: Byssus lacteus L. was introduced in Species plantarum (1753) from a brief diagnosis and a reference to Dillenius's figure in Historia muscorum. Jørgensen, James and Jarvis found no original material in the Linnaean Herbarium, rejected an earlier typification, and showed that the associated Dillenian material in Oxford represents two species of Ochrolechia that match neither Linnaeus's diagnosis nor the illustration. Because the original material cannot be tied with confidence to any species, they treated Byssus lacteus as a species non satis nota and proposed its rejection under Art. 56 of the Code. The Nomenclature Committee for Fungi accepted this proposal, and Index Fungorum now lists Byssus lacteus as a rejected name (nom. rej.) based on the Dillenian figure as holotype, placing it in Trentepohliaceae (Chlorophyta). The name is not used in lichen taxonomy and has sometimes been misapplied to Lichen lacteus L. (= Pertusaria lactea (L.) F.Arnold).)	N/A	N/A	N/A
Lichen ampullaceus	1753	Parmelia omphalodes (Note: Lichen ampullaceus L. was described in Species plantarum (1753) from a short diagnosis that cited an illustration in Dillenius's Historia muscorum and a work by van Royen, and Linnaeus appears to have had no material of his own. No corresponding specimen exists in the Linnaean Herbarium, and only an inserted drawing occurs in the Dillenian herbarium. The Dillenian figure was long interpreted as showing monstrous forms of what is now Platismatia glauca infected by parasites, and on that basis Culberson & Culberson treated L. ampullaceus as a rejectable monstrosity under the provisions of the Code then in force, a procedure no longer permitted. Re-examining Dillenius's text and illustration, and a later colour figure by Hoffmann from material Dillenius had sent to Jacquin, Jørgensen, James and Jarvis argued that the morphology and habitat instead match young, opening apothecia of what is now Parmelia omphalodes. They therefore treated Lichen ampullaceus as a later synonym of Lichen omphalodes and designated Dillenius's figure in Historia muscorum as lectotype, with a British Museum specimen collected by James in 1980 as epitype. Index Fungorum follows this treatment, placing the name and its homotypic synonyms in the Parmeliaceae.)	(L.) Ach.	1803	N/A
Lichen aphtosus	1753	Peltigera aphthosa	(L.) Willd.	1787	
Lichen aquaticus	1753	Dermatocarpon luridum	(Dill. ex With.) J.R.Laundon	1984	
Lichen arcticus	1753	Nephroma arcticum	(L.) Torss.	1843	
Lichen articulatus	1753	Usnea articulata	(L.) Hoffm.	1796	
Lichen atro-albus	1753	Nom. rej. (Note: Lichen atro-albus L. was introduced in Species plantarum (1753) as a crustose, saxicolous lichen, but no original material is preserved in the Linnaean Herbarium and the brief protologue could apply to several different alpine crusts. Acharius applied the name to a member of the Rhizocarpon badioatrum complex, and later authors used it inconsistently for various lecidioid crusts, so its identity remained unclear and the name fell out of use at species rank. Jørgensen, James and Jarvis therefore treated L. atro-albus as a species non satis nota without a type and proposed its rejection under Art. 56 of the Code. The Nomenclature Committee for Fungi recommended this proposal, and Index Fungorum now lists Lichen atroalbus (without the hyphen) as a formally rejected name (nom. rej.).)	N/A	N/A	N/A
Lichen atro-virens	1753	Nom. rej. (Note: Lichen atro-virens L. was introduced in Species plantarum (1753) using the same brief diagnosis that Linnaeus had already published in Flora svecica, with no cited synonyms. It was described simply as a saxicolous crust, and no original material survives in the Linnaean Herbarium, so the name has always been difficult to interpret. During the nineteenth and early twentieth centuries it was applied to various taxa within the Rhizocarpon geographicum complex, but the diagnosis is so general that it could fit almost any member of that group. Runemark therefore treated L. atro-virens as a nomen ambiguum, and the name fell out of regular use. Jørgensen, James and Jarvis regarded it as a species non satis nota without a type and proposed its rejection under Art. 56 of the Code. The Nomenclature Committee for Fungi recommended this proposal, and Index Fungorum now lists Lichen atrovirens (without the hyphen) as a formally rejected name (nom. rej.), with the material historically covered by the name placed within the Rhizocarpon geographicum complex.)	N/A	N/A	N/A
Lichen barbatus	1753	Usnea barbata	(L.) F.H.Wigg.	1780	
Lichen burgessii	1774	Leptogium burgessii	(L.) Mont.	1840	
Lichen byssoides	1767	Baeomyces rufus	(L.) P.Gaertn., B.Mey. & Scherb.	1802	
Lichen calcareus	1753	Circinaria calcarea	(L.) A.Nordin, Savić & Tibell	2010	
Lichen calicaris	1753	Ramalina calicaris	(L.) Röhl.	1813	
Lichen candelarius	1753	Polycauliona candelaria	(L.) Frödén, Arup & Søchting	2013	
Lichen caninus	1753	Peltigera canina	(L.) Willd.	1787	
Lichen caperatus	1753	Flavoparmelia caperata	(L.) Hale	1986	
Lichen carpineus	1753	Glaucomaria carpinea	(L.) S.Y.Kondr., L.Lőkös & Farkas	2019	
Lichen centrifugus	1753	Arctoparmelia centrifuga	(L.) Hale	1986	
Lichen chalybeiformis	1753	Bryoria capillaris	(L.) Brodo & D.Hawksw.	1977	
Lichen chrysophthalmus	1771	Teloschistes chrysophthalmus	(L.) Th.Fr.	1861	
Lichen ciliaris	1753	Anaptychia ciliaris	(L.) Körb. ex A.Massal.	1853	
Lichen cinereus	1767	Aspicilia cinerea	(L.) Körb.	1855	
Lichen cocciferus	1753	Cladonia coccifera	(L.) Willd.	1787	
Lichen corallinus	1767	Lepra corallina	(L.) Hafellner	2016	
Lichen cornucopioides	1753	Nom. rej. (Note: Lichen cornucopioides L. was published in Species plantarum (1753) using a diagnostic phrase already employed in Flora svecica, with citations to Flora lapponica and several other works. Only one sheet in the Linnaean Herbarium (LINN 1273.217) bears the relevant cross-references; it consists of a richly branched thallus of Cladonia squamosa glued over a single narrow-cupped podetium that Jørgensen, James and Jarvis interpreted as a young member of the Cladonia cornuta complex, best referred to subsp. groenlandica. Linnaeus, however, described the apothecia of L. cornucopioides as red (coccineus), whereas both this element and the taxa depicted in the cited figures (Cladonia cervicornis subsp. verticillata) have brown apothecia and were probably treated by him as an unnamed variety under Lichen pyxidatus. Because of these inconsistencies, Vainio had already recommended abandoning the name, which has seen virtually no use since his 1887 monograph. Jørgensen, James and Jarvis lectotypified L. cornucopioides on the central podetium of LINN 1273.217 but regarded it as a species non satis nota whose continued availability threatened the well-established name Cladonia groenlandica when treated at species rank, and therefore proposed its rejection under Art. 56 of the Code. The Nomenclature Committee for Fungi supported this proposal, and Index Fungorum now lists Lichen cornucopioides as a rejected name (nom. rej.) with LINN 1273.217 (central specimen) as lectotype.)	N/A	N/A	N/A
Lichen cornutus	1753	Cladonia cornuta	(L.) Hoffm.	1791	
Lichen cristatus	1753	Lathagrium cristatum	(L.) Otálora, P.M.Jørg. & Wedin	2014	
Lichen crocatus	1771	Pseudocyphellaria crocata	(L.) Vain.	1898	
Lichen croceus	1753	Solorina crocea	(L.) Ach.	1808	
Lichen cylindricus	1753	Umbilicaria cylindrica	(L.) Delise	1830	
Lichen deformis	1753	Cladonia deformis	(L.) Hoffm.	1796	
Lichen deustus	1753	Umbilicaria deusta	(L.) Baumg.	1790	
Lichen digitatus	1753	Cladonia digitata	(L.) Hoffm.	1796	
Lichen divaricatus	1767	Evernia divaricata	(L.) Ach.	1810	
Lichen ericetorum	1753	Icmadophila ericetorum	(L.) Zahlbr.	1895	
Lichen fagineus	1753	Lepra amara	(Ach.) Hafellner	2016	
Lichen fahlunensis	1753	Nom. rej. (Note: Lichen fahlunensis L. was published in Species plantarum (1753) using the same diagnostic phrase that Linnaeus had already employed in Flora svecica, with an added reference to Dillenius's Historia muscorum. Several sheets in the Linnaean Herbarium bear the name "fahlunensis", but only LINN 1273.70 carries numerical annotations in Linnaeus's hand that link it to the accounts of L. fahlunensis in Flora svecica and Species plantarum, and its material matches the original description; Jørgensen, James and Jarvis therefore selected it as lectotype. The lectotype belongs to the taxon now known as Melanelia stygia (≡ Parmelia stygia (L.) Ach.), and Schaerer later adopted the epithet "fahlunensis" when uniting L. fahlunensis with L. stygius, a choice that would normally have to be followed under Art. 11.5 of the Code. However, "fahlunensis" has long been used instead for the species now called Cetraria commixta (and in older literature also for C. hepatizon), so reintroducing it for Melanelia stygia would cause serious nomenclatural confusion. Jørgensen, James and Jarvis therefore proposed Lichen fahlunensis for rejection under Art. 56; the Nomenclature Committee for Fungi recommended this proposal, and Index Fungorum now treats L. fahlunensis as a rejected name (nom. rej.) with LINN 1273.70 as lectotype.)	style="text-align:center;" | N/A	N/A	N/A
Lichen farinaceus	1753	Ramalina farinacea	(L.) Ach.	1810	
Lichen fascicularis	1767	Gabura fascicularis	(L.) Otálora & Wedin	2013	
Lichen fimbriatus	1753	Cladonia fimbriata	(L.) Fr.	1831	
Lichen floridus	1753	Usnea florida	(L.) F.H.Wigg.	1780	
Lichen fragilis	1753	Sphaerophorus fragilis	(L.) Pers.	1794	
Lichen fraxineus	1753	Ramalina fraxinea	(L.) Ach.	1810	
Lichen fuciformis	1753	Roccella fuciformis	(L.) DC.	1805	
Lichen furfuraceus	1753	Pseudevernia furfuracea var. furfuracea	(L.) Zopf	1903	
Lichen fusco-ater	1753	Lecidea fuscoatra	(L.) Ach.	1803	
Lichen gelidus	1767	Placopsis gelida	(L.) Linds.	1866	
Lichen geographicus	1753	Rhizocarpon geographicum	(L.) DC.	1805	
Lichen glaucus	1753	Platismatia glauca	(L.) W.L.Culb. & C.F.Culb.	1968	
Lichen globiferus	1767	Sphaerophorus globosus	(Huds.) Vain.	1903	
Lichen gracilis	1753	Cladonia gracilis	(L.) Willd.	1787	
Lichen hirtus	1753	Usnea hirta	(L.) F.H.Wigg.	1780	
Lichen islandicus	1753	Cetraria islandica subsp. islandica	(L.) Ach.	1803	
Lichen islandicus var. tenuissimus	1753	Cetraria aculeata	(Schreb.) Fr.	1826	
Lichen jubatus	1753	Nom. rej. (Note: Lichen jubatus L. was published in Species plantarum (1753) using an unchanged diagnostic phrase from Flora svecica, with a citation to its earlier treatment in Flora lapponica and several additional synonyms. Two sheets in the Linnaean Herbarium bear this name; Howe selected LINN 1273.281 as lectotype, and Hawksworth later restricted this typification to the left-hand specimen, which carries Linnaeus's annotations linking it to both works. Jørgensen, James and Jarvis interpreted this specimen as a coarse, sparsely branched form of what is now treated as Bryoria cf. fremontii, lacking the characteristic yellow soralia, rather than the taxon understood as Alectoria prolixa by Motyka. Because Lichen jubatus had been applied inconsistently to various brown pendent Bryoria species, Hawksworth and Sherwood proposed its rejection; this was recommended by the Committee for Fungi and Lichens, and the name is now treated as formally rejected (nom. rej.) under Art. 56 of the Code. Index Fungorum lists Lichen jubatus as a rejected name with LINN 1273.281 (left-hand specimen) as lectotype and places the corresponding taxon in the Parmeliaceae.)	N/A	N/A	N/A
Lichen juniperinus	1753	Vulpicida juniperinus	(L.) J.-E.Mattsson & M.J.Lai	1993	
Lichen lacteus	1767	Varicellaria lactea	(L.) I.Schmitt & Lumbsch	2012	
Lichen lanatus	1753	Ephebe lanata	(L.) Vain.	1888	
Lichen leucomelos	1763	Leucodermia leucomelos	(L.) Kalb	2015	
Lichen miniatus	1753	Dermatocarpon miniatum var. miniatum	(L.) W.Mann	1825	
Lichen nivalis	1753	Nephromopsis nivalis	(L.) Divakar, A.Crespo & Lumbsch	2017	
Lichen olivaceus	1753	Melanohalea olivacea	(L.) O.Blanco, A.Crespo, Divakar, Essl., D.Hawksw. & Lumbsch	2004	
Lichen omphalodes	1753	Parmelia omphalodes	(L.) Ach.	1803	
Lichen pallescens	1753	Ochrolechia pallescens	(L.) A.Massal.	1853	
Lichen parellus	1767	Ochrolechia parella f. parella	(L.) A.Massal.	1852	
Lichen parietinus	1753	Xanthoria parietina var. parietina	(L.) Th.Fr.	1860	
Lichen paschalis	1753	Stereocaulon paschale	(L.) Hoffm.	1796	
Lichen pertusus Nom. cons. prop.	1767	Pertusaria pertusa	(L.) Tuck.	1845	
Lichen physodes	1753	Hypogymnia physodes	(L.) Nyl.	1896	
Lichen plicatus	1753	Nom. rej. (Note: Lichen plicatus L. was published in Species plantarum (1753) with a diagnostic phrase borrowed from Flora svecica, cited again from Materia medica and Flora lapponica with additional synonyms. No specimen in the Linnaean Herbarium is explicitly labelled with this name; one sheet annotated by Linnaeus as Lichen hirtus and bearing the Flora svecica number of L. plicatus shows that part of his original concept was later absorbed into L. hirtus, while another sheet interpreted by Vainio and Howe as L. plicatus does not fit Linnaeus's broadened later usage. Once the Flora svecica material is reassigned to L. hirtus, the only remaining original element for L. plicatus is Dillenius's illustration in Historia muscorum, which depicts Usnea ceratina, a southern Swedish species rather than a Lapland plant. Because Linnaeus's description is imprecise, the later combination Usnea plicata (L.) F.H.Wigg. was applied to several different taxa in the difficult genus Usnea, and Motyka attempted to revive it for a very rare and poorly known central Swedish entity. Jørgensen, James and Jarvis lectotypified L. plicatus on Dillenius's figure, thereby tying the name to Usnea ceratina, but argued that the confused history of usage and the threat this posed to the well-established name U. ceratina made it preferable to reject L. plicatus under Art. 56 of the Code. Their proposal was recommended by the Nomenclature Committee for Fungi, and Index Fungorum now treats Lichen plicatus as a rejected name (nom. rej.) with the Dillenian plate as lectotype.)	N/A	N/A	N/A
Lichen polyphyllus	1753	Umbilicaria polyphylla	(L.) Baumg.	1790	
Lichen polyrhizos	1753	Umbilicaria polyrrhiza	(L.) Fr.	1825	
Lichen proboscideus	1753	Umbilicaria proboscidea	(L.) Schrad.	1794	
Lichen prunastri	1753	Evernia prunastri	(L.) Ach.	1810	
Lichen pubescens	1753	Pseudephebe pubescens	(L.) M.Choisy	1930	
Lichen pulmonarius	1753	Lobaria pulmonaria	(L.) Hoffm.	1796	
Lichen pustulatus	1753	Lasallia pustulata	(L.) Mérat	1821	
Lichen pyxidatus	1753	Cladonia pyxidata	(L.) Hoffm.	1796	
Lichen rangiferinus	1753	Cladonia rangiferina	(L.) Weber ex F.H.Wigg.	1780	
Lichen rangiferinus var. alpestris	1753	Cladonia stellaris	(Opiz) Pouzar & Vězda	1971	
Lichen rangiferinus var. sylvaticus	1753	Cladonia portentosa	(Dufour) Coem.	1865	
Lichen resupinatus	1753	Nephroma resupinatum	(L.) Ach.	1810	
Lichen roccella	1753	Roccella tinctoria (Note: Lichen roccella L. was introduced in Species plantarum (1753) for a maritime, fruticose lichen used as a dye. Jørgensen, James and Jarvis located two relevant specimens on LINN 1273.263 and, following Howe's earlier choice of that sheet, restricted the lectotype to the lower specimen, which contains lecanoric acid and represents the sorediate Macaronesian taxon they treated as Roccella patellata (≡ R. tuberculosa var. vincentina). Candolle later introduced Roccella tinctoria DC. as a replacement name (nomen novum) for Lichen roccella, explicitly citing Linnaeus's species, so the two names share the same type; Tehler showed that R. tinctoria is the correct current name for this sorediate species, with R. patellata, R. vincentina and several other names falling into its synonymy. Some modern databases list Roccella phycopsis as the current name for Lichen roccella, but that combination is based on Lichen fucoides Dicks. and applies to a different Atlantic species; Tehler clarified that R. phycopsis is the correct name for R. fucoides, not for Linnaeus's Lichen roccella.)	DC.	1805	
Lichen rugosus	1753	Ascodichaena rugosa	Butin	1977	
Lichen rupicola	1767	Glaucomaria rupicola var. rupicola	(L.) P.F.Cannon	2022	
Lichen saccatus	1755	Solorina saccata	(L.) Ach.	1808	
Lichen sanguinarius	1753	Mycoblastus sanguinarius f. sanguinarius	(L.) Norman	1852	
Lichen saxatilis	1753	Parmelia saxatilis	(L.) Ach.	1803	
Lichen scriptus	1753	Graphis scripta	(L.) Ach.	1809	
Lichen stellaris	1753	Physcia stellaris	(L.) Nyl.	1853	
Lichen stygius	1753	Melanelia stygia	(L.) Essl.	1978	
Lichen subfuscus	1753	Nom. rej. (Note: Lichen subfuscus L. was described in Species plantarum (1753) using a diagnostic phrase borrowed from Flora svecica, with "leprosus" altered to "crustaceus", and a single synonym from Dillenius's Historia muscorum. No original material in the Linnaean Herbarium bears this name. Motyka later designated a neotype in the Acharius herbarium (UPS), but because Dillenius's figure is original material available to Linnaeus, it has priority for lectotypification. Brodo and Vitikainen accordingly selected Dillenius's plate XVIII, figure 16 as lectotype and identified the corresponding Dillenian specimen as part of the Lecanora subfusca complex, most plausibly referable to Lecanora horiza, although earlier authors had treated it as L. allophana. Since its introduction, Lichen subfuscus / Lecanora subfusca has been used in a broad and ambiguous way for both corticolous and saxicolous lichens, giving rise to around eighty infraspecific taxa; workers have disagreed over which element represented the "typical" taxon, and Magnusson and others largely abandoned the name as unworkable. Brodo and Vitikainen therefore proposed that L. subfuscus be treated as a long-persistent nomen ambiguum and placed on the list of rejected names, arguing that reinstating it in place of the well-established L. allophana would replace a stable name with a confused one. Their proposal was recommended by the Nomenclature Committee and approved by the General Committee, and Index Fungorum now treats Lichen subfuscus as a rejected name (nom. rej.) with the Dillenian figure as lectotype.)	N/A	N/A	N/A
Lichen subulatus	1753	Cladonia subulata	(L.) Weber ex F.H.Wigg.	1780	
Lichen tartareus	1753	Ochrolechia tartarea	(L.) A.Massal.	1852	
Lichen uncialis	1753	Cladonia uncialis subsp. uncialis	(L.) Weber ex F.H.Wigg.	1780	
Lichen upsaliensis	1753	Ochrolechia upsaliensis	(L.) A.Massal.	1852	
Lichen usnea	1767	Ramalina usnea	(L.) R.Howe	1914	
Lichen velleus	1753	Umbilicaria vellea	(L.) Ach.	1794	
Lichen venosus	1753	Peltigera venosa	(L.) Hoffm.	1789	
Lichen ventosus	1753	Ophioparma ventosa	(L.) Norman	1852	
Lichen vernalis	1768	Biatora vernalis	(L.) Fr.	1822	
Lichen vulpinus	1753	Letharia vulpina	(L.) Hue	1899	
Mucor fulvus	1753	Chaenotheca furfuracea (Note: Mucor fulvus L. was introduced in Species plantarum (1753) with a new diagnostic phrase and no cited synonyms. No original material is preserved in the Linnaean Herbarium, and the description is too imprecise to identify the species with confidence. Linnaeus clearly intended a yellow calicioid lichen, and Zahlbruckner treated the name as a form of what is now Chaenotheca furfuracea, but the epithet "fulvus" suggests a more tawny yellow-brown thallus, such as in Chaenotheca chrysocephala, so its identity remains uncertain. Jørgensen, James and Jarvis therefore regarded M. fulvus as a species non satis nota not in current use and proposed it for rejection under Art. 56 of the Code. The Nomenclature Committee for Fungi supported this proposal, and Index Fungorum now lists Mucor fulvus as a rejected name (nom. rej.), treating it as an obsolete synonym of Chaenotheca furfuracea and citing a Solander collection from Sweden as lectotype.)	(L.) Tibell	1984	
Mucor furfuraceus	1753	Chaenotheca furfuracea	(L.) Tibell	1984	
Mucor lichenoides	1753	Calicium salicinum (Note: Mucor lichenoides L. was published in Species plantarum (1753) using a diagnostic phrase already employed in Flora svecica, with "lentiformi" altered to "lenticulari" and a single synonym from Dillenius's Historia muscorum. Linnaeus left no annotated material in the Linnaean Herbarium, but the Dillenian specimen corresponding to the cited figure consists of two calicioid lichens, Calicium viride and C. calicioid salicinum. Because Linnaeus's protologue does not mention a green thallus, Jørgensen, James and Jarvis interpreted the name via the smaller, lower specimen, which has a grey thallus, matches the illustration and represents C. calicioid salicinum; Dillenius had reversed the thallus colours of the two species in his text. They therefore selected Dillenius's plate XIV, figure 3 (lower specimen) as lectotype, making the later combination Calicium lichenoides (L.) Schumach. the oldest available name for this species under the Code. The epithet lichenoides fell out of use early in the twentieth century, whereas Calicium salicinum Pers. has long been the accepted and well-established name for the species. Reintroducing C. lichenoides in place of C. salicinum would replace a stable name with one largely abandoned, so Jørgensen, James and Jarvis proposed Mucor lichenoides for rejection under Art. 56. Their proposal was recommended by the Nomenclature Committee for Fungi and accepted by the General Committee, and Index Fungorum now lists Mucor lichenoides as a rejected name (nom. rej.), with the Dillenian figure as lectotype and Calicium salicinum retained as the current name in use.)	Pers.	1794	
Mucor sphaerocephalus	1753	Calicium lenticulare (Note: Mucor sphaerocephalus L. was described in Species plantarum (1753) using an unchanged diagnostic phrase from Flora svecica and with a citation to Haller's 1717 illustration. No original specimens are preserved in the Linnaean Herbarium, and Linnaeus's account in Flora svecica shows that he lumped together several discordant elements, including a fungus on Mesembryanthemum in the Uppsala botanical garden and material from walls and stones. Haller's plate depicts two quite different organisms: figure 3A, with a grey, fluffy, spherical head, most likely a myxomycete (or possibly a Coniocybe), and figure 3B, with a cup-shaped blackish head, a Calicium that does not match Linnaeus's description of grey-headed (capitula cineria) plants. Linnaeus therefore seems to have intended the myxomycete-like figure 3A, but without original material its identity cannot be determined with certainty, and the name never came into general use; Acharius already concluded in 1816 that there was no point in maintaining it. Jørgensen, James and Jarvis treated M. sphaerocephalus as a species non satis nota and proposed the basionym for rejection under Art. 56, a proposal later recommended by the Nomenclature Committee for Fungi and accepted by the General Committee. Index Fungorum now lists Mucor sphaerocephalus as a rejected name (nom. rej.) with Haller's figure as lectotype and associates it with the well-established calicioid lichen Calicium lenticulare.)	Ach.	1816	N/A
Tremella lichenoides	1753	Scytinium lichenoides	(L.) Otálora, P.M.Jørg. & Wedin	2014	

== Glossary ==
- Art. 56 – the article of the International Code of Nomenclature for algae, fungi, and plants (ICNafp) that allows a scientific name to be formally rejected when its continued use would cause confusion or instability (for example, because the original description is unidentifiable, ambiguous, or threatens a well-established name). A name rejected under Art. 56 becomes unavailable for use and is listed as nom. rej.
- basionym – the original name on which a new name is based
- nom. cons. prop. – nomen conservandum propositum; meaning "a name proposed for conservation". It indicates that a formal proposal has been submitted to conserve a particular name against an earlier competing one under Article 14 of the ICNafp
- nom. illeg. – nomen illegitimum; an illegitimate name according to the ICNafp
- nom. rej. – nomen rejiciendum; a name that has been formally rejected and is no longer available for use
- nom. rej. prop. – nomen rejiciendum propositum; as above, but in the proposal stage and not yet ratified
