= Eurotium =

Scientific classification
- Domain: Eukaryota
- Kingdom: Fungi
- Division: Ascomycota
- Class: Eurotiomycetes
- Order: Eurotiales
- Family: Aspergillaceae
- Genus: Eurotium; Link (1809)

Type species
- Eurotium herbariorum (Weber ex F.H.Wigg.) Link ex Nees

Genus of fungi

Eurotium is a genus of fungi belonging to the family Aspergillaceae.

The genus was circumscribed by Heinrich Friedrich Link in 1809.

Because of nomenclatural changes brought about by one fungus one name, most of the species formerly placed in Eurotium have been transferred to Aspergillus. It mainly contained teleomorphs of subgenus Aspergillus.

As of April 2025, Species Fungorum (in the Catalogue of Life) accepts four species of Eurotium:

- Eurotium acutum Blaser (1976)
- Eurotium carnoyi Malloch & Cain (1972)
  - Re-assigned to Aspergillus neocarnoyi Kozak (1989) in Houbracken et al. (2020)
- Eurotium lateritium Mont. (1849)
- Eurotium microsporum Massee & E.S.Salmon (1901)
