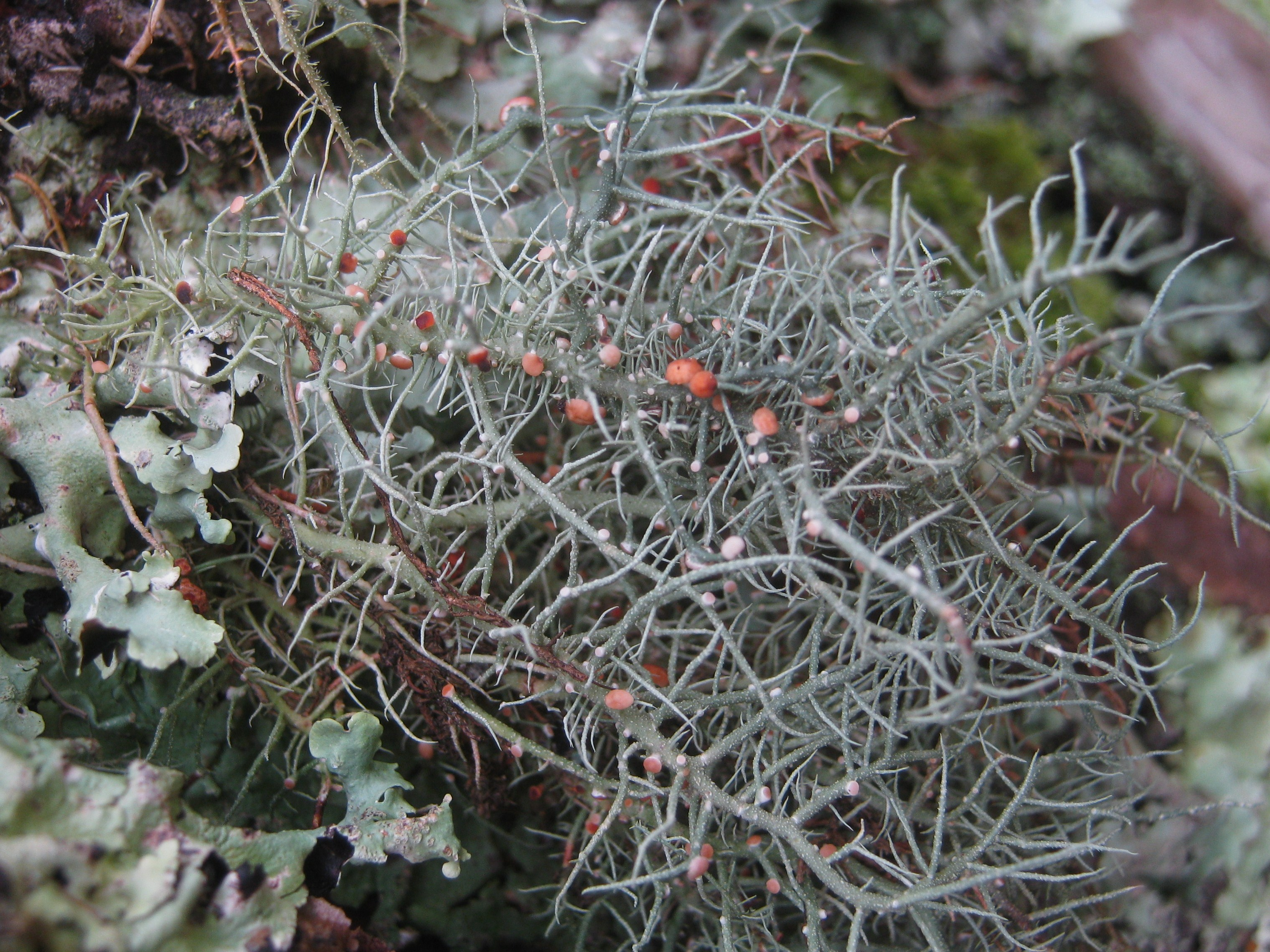

Scientific classification
- Kingdom: Fungi
- Division: Basidiomycota
- Class: Tremellomycetes
- Order: Tremellales
- Genus: Biatoropsis
- Species: B. usnearum

Binomial name
- Biatoropsis usnearum Räsänen (1934)

= Biatoropsis usnearum =

Species of fungus

Biatoropsis usnearum is a species of parasitic fungus that grows exclusively on lichen species of the genus Usnea, particularly U. subfloridana, U. barbata, and U. florida. First described in 1934 by Veli Räsänen, it has become a significant model organism in fungal evolution studies due to its specialised host relationships. The fungus belongs to the order Tremellales, though its precise family classification remains uncertain. It forms distinctive swellings or galls on its host lichens, ranging in colour from pale pink to dark reddish-brown, and notably suppresses the production of host defensive compounds like usnic acid. While initially misclassified due to its unusual characteristics, modern microscopic and genetic studies have revealed it to be part of a species complex, with at least three additional species now recognised. Found across Europe and North America, B. usnearum preferentially infects young, growing parts of its host lichens, particularly branch tips and small branches. The species has become particularly important in understanding how parasitic fungi adapt to new hosts, as it demonstrates evolution through switching between different host species rather than evolving alongside a single host species over time.

== Taxonomy ==
=== Historical classification ===
The taxonomic history of Biatoropsis usnearum spans over two centuries of scientific observation. Johann Jacob Dillenius first documented what would later be recognised as B. usnearum in his 1742 work "Historia Muscorum" describing small fleshy nodules closely appressed to Usnea branches. Erik Acharius, known as the "Father of Lichenology", made several observations of these structures between 1795 and 1810, referring to them variously as froredningsdelar (seed-producing parts) and later distinguishing between normal disc-shaped apothecia (which he termed "orbilla") and what we now know to be basidiomata (which he termed "cephalodia").

Throughout the 19th and early 20th centuries, various authors applied different terms to describe these structures. Gray and Knowles used "cephalodia" in 1821 and 1929 respectively, while Smith introduced "pseudo-cephalodia" in 1918, and Ludwig Schaerer proposed "patellulae" in 1850.

=== Modern classification ===
Räsänen formally described Biatoropsis usnearum in 1934, initially classifying it as an ascomycete based on what he interpreted as asci containing hyaline, simple spores measuring 10–16 by 4–6.5 μm. In 1939, he further specified that these supposed asci were 8-spored. However, these structures were later recognised to be young probasidia.

In 1949, Rolf Santesson was the first to challenge its classification as an ascomycete, though he incorrectly suggested the structures were galls caused by Abrothallus parmeliarum. The true nature of B. usnearum as a heterobasidiomycete was not confirmed until 1990, when detailed microscopic examination revealed a hymenium with auricularioid basidia and no ascomycetous structures.

=== Current systematic position ===
Molecular studies have revealed that B. usnearum represents a species complex containing several distinct species. While B. usnearum sensu stricto remains widespread, recent research has shown that many specimens historically identified as this species must now be considered doubtfully identified due to morphological intermediacy between known species or lack of clear distinguishing characteristics. Three additional species were formally described from this complex in 2016:

- B. hafellneri – Distinguished by having two-celled basidia with cells that elongate laterally at maturity, and by growing on species of the Usnea fragilescens aggregate
- B. minuta – Characterised by small (less than 1 mm) brown to black basidiomatal galls, growing on Usnea barbata and U. lapponica
- B. protousneae – Confined to Protousnea dusenii

Research has shown that host switching, rather than cospeciation, has been the primary driver of diversification within this group, particularly in host-specialised lineages. Different host-specific species have been found to occur in sympatry, suggesting that speciation occurs through adaptive specialization rather than geographic isolation.

The genus Biatoropsis was initially tentatively placed in the order Platygloeales based on its transversely septate basidia, absence of clamp connections, and strong morphological similarity to the genus Mycogloea. The genus can be distinguished from related taxa by its non-deciduous basidia, which differs from Mycogloea, and by the absence of distinct probasidia, unlike Platygloea which has swollen cells under the septate portion of basidia.

Biatoropsis usnearum produces an anamorph that strongly resembles Hormomyces aurantiacus. The anamorph is characterised by its hyphomycetous growth form, producing long branching chains of hyaline, ellipsoid conidia measuring 3–5 by 2–3.5 μm.

While several species of Tremella possess transverse or oblique basidial septa similar to B. usnearum, its placement outside the Tremellales is supported by its distinctive basidial morphology and the absence of clamp connections. However, definitive placement within the Platygloeales awaits ultrastructural analysis of septal pores, as suggested by Moore's 1990 work on the order. The taxonomic understanding of this species was hampered for many years because lichenologists examining infected Usnea specimens generally had limited experience with heterobasidiomycetes, leading to misinterpretation of probasidial structures as asci or spores.

== Description ==
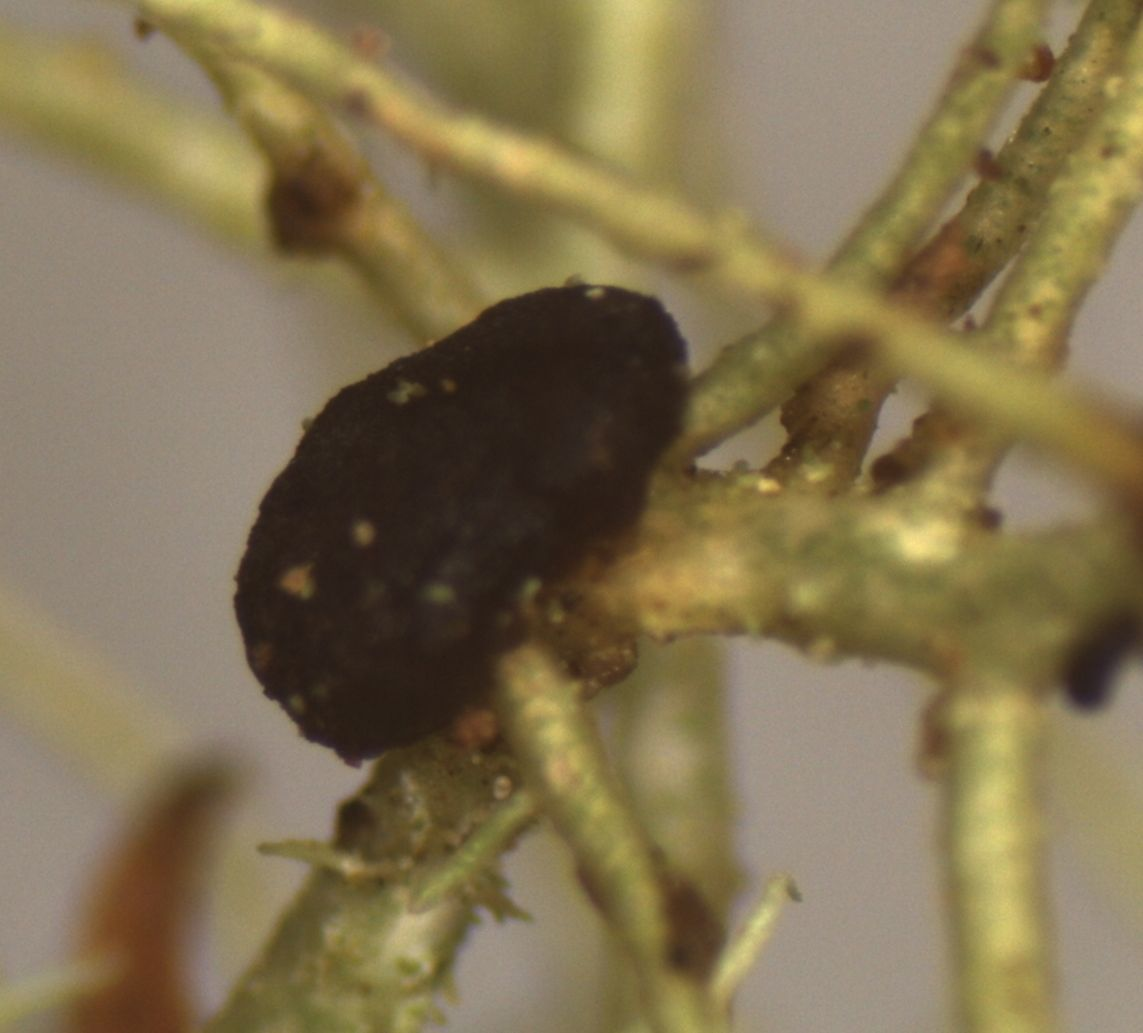
A black, rounded gall of B. usnearum growing on a Usnea branch

Biatoropsis usnearum forms distinctive growths, known as basidiomata, on its host lichens. These structures show considerable variation in their appearance, but typically appear as rounded, convex swellings with a narrowed base. The basidiomata can range in colour from pale pink to reddish brown or black, and measure between 0.2 and 2.5 mm in diameter. Their surface is usually smooth, though occasionally it may become warty. The texture is cartilaginous, similar to firm jelly.

The species in its strict sense (sensu stricto) is characterised by large, pale pinkish brown basidiomata that may sometimes become darker. These typical forms can be distinguished from other members of the species complex by this consistent colouration and size, though some specimens may darken due to parasitic fungi.

The development of these structures follows a characteristic pattern. The infection begins in the outer protective layer (cortex) of the host lichen, where it triggers changes in the host's own thread-like structures (hyphae). The first visible signs are pale to reddish spots on the lichen's surface, where the number of algal cells is already reduced. As the fungus grows upward through the host's cortex, it begins producing reproductive structures, eventually forming a mature gall that lacks algal cells entirely.

The internal structure of these growths consists of microscopic threads called hyphae, which measure 2-3 μm in width. These hyphae have uniform walls and lack specialised connecting structures known as clamp connections. The fungus connects to its host through specialised feeding structures called haustorial branches. These consist of a rounded "mother cell" measuring 2.5–4.5 μm in diameter, from which extends a very fine filament 0.5–1 μm thick and 3–7 μm long.

The reproductive layer, called the hymenium, appears clear or colourless under the microscope, though it may sometimes show a reddish-brown colouration in its upper portion. This layer contains numerous probasidia, which are early stages of the reproductive structures. The mature reproductive structures, called basidia, are club-shaped to nearly cylindrical and divided by 1–3 cross-walls. They measure 20–44 μm long by 3–6.5 μm wide. From these basidia emerge long, thin extensions called epibasidia, which can reach up to 85 μm in length while maintaining a width of 2–3 μm.

The spores produced by B. usnearum are nearly spherical to oval-shaped, with a distinctive projection point called an apiculum. They measure 4.5–8 μm long by 4–7.5 μm wide. The fungus also produces an asexual reproductive form (anamorph) that creates long, branching chains of clear, oval-shaped cells measuring 3–5 by 2–3.5 μm.

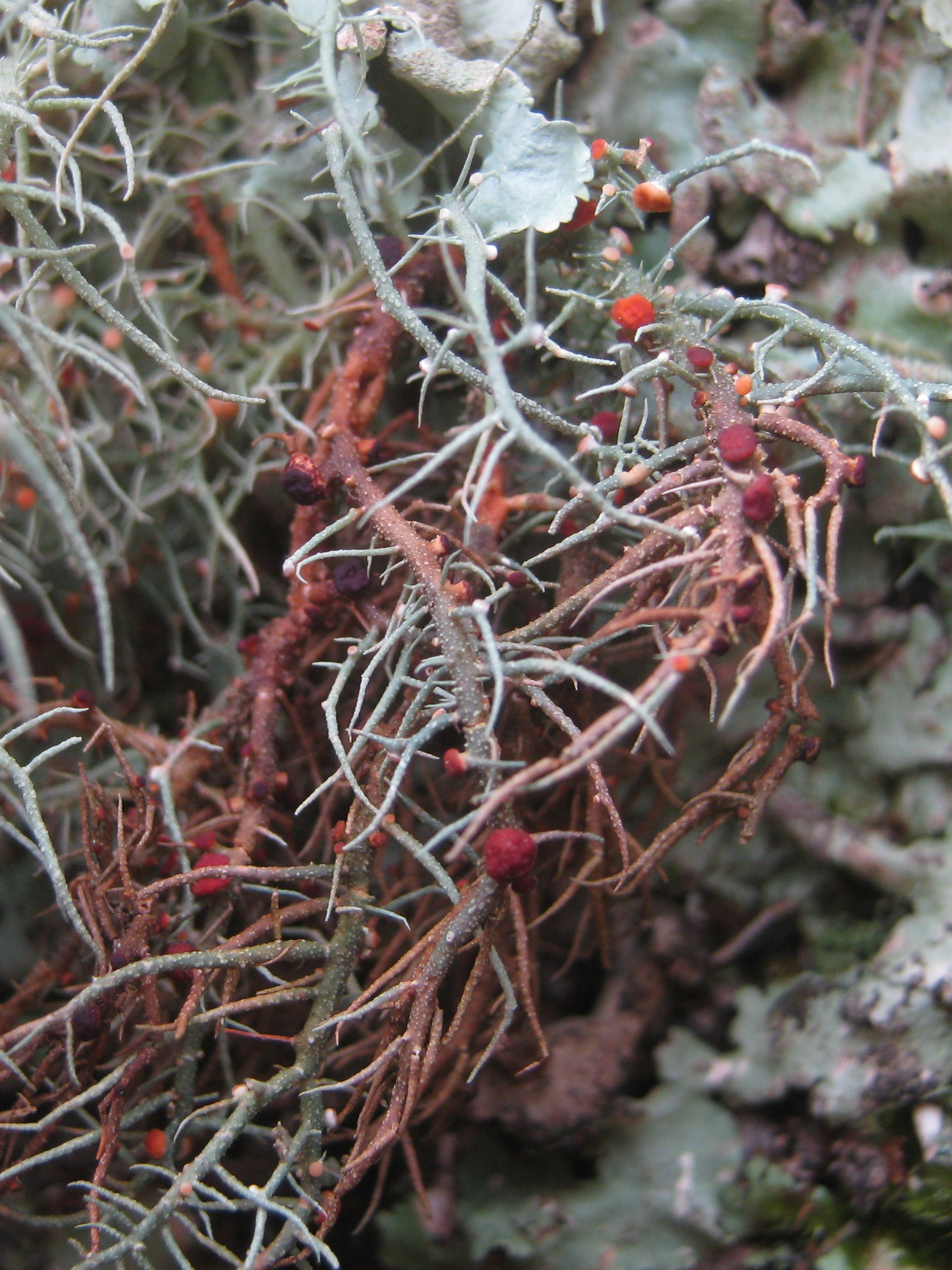
Reddish-brown galls of B. usnearum on multiple branches of a Usnea thallus

When B. usnearum infects a host lichen, it often causes a characteristic bending or curving of the lichen's branches at the point of infection. The fungus preferentially infects young and growing parts of the host, particularly branch tips, fibrils (small branches), and areas beneath developing reproductive structures. Notably, when the fungus infects a part of the lichen, it suppresses the production of usnic acid, a characteristic lichen compound, in the infected area. While the fungus is most commonly found growing on various species of Usnea lichens worldwide, it has also been documented on the related genus Protousnea. Interestingly, it has never been found on Usnea species from the subgenus Neuropogon, suggesting some degree of host specificity. Field observations have shown that when multiple Usnea species grow together, not all species are equally susceptible to infection by B. usnearum.

Advanced microscopic imaging techniques reveal that in mature galls of B. usnearum, the basidia are situated at the surface of the gall, while infective hyphae with haustoria are abundant in the central zone and extend to a lesser degree into the basal layers. When stained with special dyes, the fungal cells show a distinctive orangish colour that distinguishes them from the greenish host cells. This structured organization differs from some other gall-forming lichenicolous fungi, like Tremella cetrariicola, where the parasitic hyphae are distributed more evenly throughout the gall.

== Habitat and distribution ==
Biatoropsis usnearum sensu stricto is found growing specifically on six Usnea species: U. subfloridana, U. barbata, U. cavernosa, U. florida, U. glabrescens, and U. intermedia. The species has been confirmed from several locations in Europe (Austria, Finland, Poland, Sweden, and Scotland) and North America (Alberta and British Columbia in Canada, Minnesota in USA). However, its true distribution is likely more extensive than currently documented. Many historical records and reported locations for this species need to be reevaluated, as specimens previously identified as B. usnearum may represent other species in the complex.

Research suggests there may be patterns in how these fungi have evolved to interact with their hosts – lichenicolous fungi that are phylogenetically related to lichens themselves tend to target the algal symbionts in lichen associations, while those from primarily non-lichenised fungal groups (like B. usnearum) appear better adapted to parasitising the fungal component of the lichen.

The fungus preferentially infects young and growing parts of the host, particularly branch tips, fibrils (small branches), and areas beneath developing reproductive structures. Notably, when the fungus infects a part of the lichen, it suppresses the production of usnic acid, a characteristic lichen compound, in the infected area.
