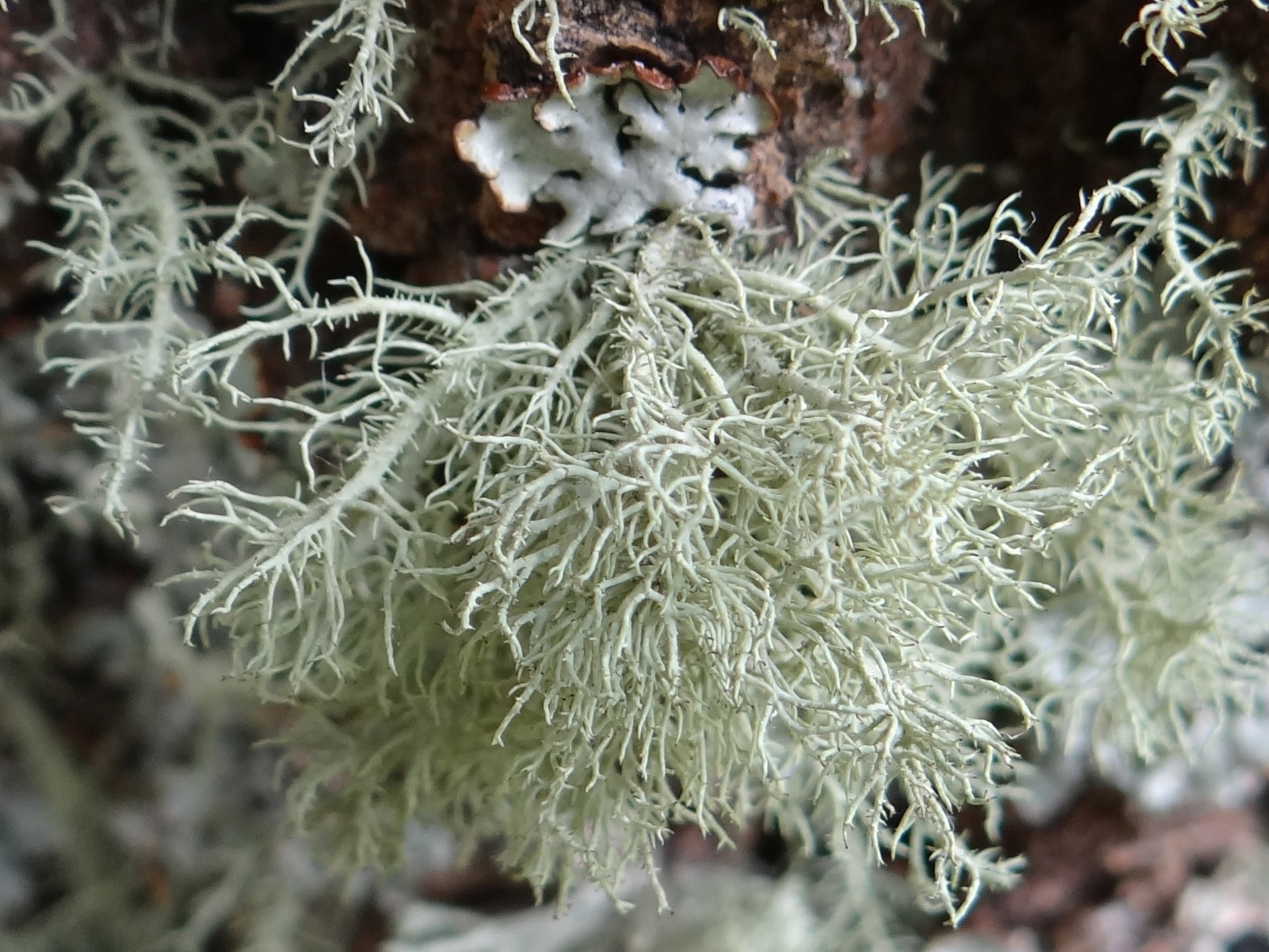
- In Vyšné Ružbachy, Slovakia

Conservation status
- Secure (NatureServe)

Scientific classification
- Kingdom: Fungi
- Division: Ascomycota
- Class: Lecanoromycetes
- Order: Lecanorales
- Family: Parmeliaceae
- Genus: Usnea
- Species: U. hirta

Binomial name
- Usnea hirta (L.) F.H.Wigg. (1780)

Synonyms
- Lichen hirtus L. (1753) (basionym); List: Lichen floridus var. hirtus (L.) Willd. (1787); Parmelia barbata f. hirta (L.) Schaer. (1840); Parmelia barbata var. hirta (L.) Schaer. (1840); Parmelia plicata var. hirta (L.) Becker (1828); Usnea barbata f. hirta (L.) Rabenh. (1845); Usnea barbata f. villosa (Ach.) Nyl. (1861); Usnea barbata subsp. hirta (L.) Fink (1910); Usnea barbata var. hirta (L.) Fr. (1831); Usnea barbata var. villosa (Ach.) Koltz (1897); Usnea ceratina f. villosa (Ach.) Harm. (1907); Usnea ceratina var. villosa (Ach.) H.Olivier (1921); Usnea florida f. hirta (L.) Kremp. (1861); Usnea florida f. minutissima Mereschk. (1913); Usnea florida f. villosa (Ach.) Zahlbr. (1930); Usnea florida var. hirta (L.) Ach. (1803); Usnea florida var. hirtus (L.) DC. (1805); Usnea florida var. villosa Ach. (1810); Usnea hirta f. minutissima (Mereschk.) Mereschk. (1919); Usnea hirta subsp. comiformis (Motyka ex Räsänen) Motyka (1936); Usnea hirta subsp. minutissima (Mereschk.) Motyka (1936); Usnea hirta subsp. trachista (Motyka) P.Clerc (2007); Usnea hirta subsp. villosa (Ach.) Motyka (1930); Usnea hirta var. comiformis Motyka ex Räsänen (1933); Usnea hirta var. minutissima (Mereschk.) Cretz.; Usnea plicata f. hirta (L.) Ach. (1814); Usnea plicata var. hirta (L.) Ach. (1810)

= Usnea hirta =

Species of lichen-forming fungus

Usnea hirta is a species of beard lichen in the family Parmeliaceae. It was one of 80 lichen species first formally described by Carl Linnaeus in his 1753 work Species Plantarum. Friedrich Heinrich Wiggers transferred it to the genus Usnea in 1780. The lichen is sensitive to air pollution, and is often used as a biomonitor of sulphur dioxide. Usnea hirta has an extensive worldwide distribution, and it is morphologically variable, which has led to numerous intraspecific taxa (i.e. subspecies, varieties, and forms) being proposed in its taxonomic history.

== See also ==
- List of lichens named by Carl Linnaeus
- List of Usnea species
