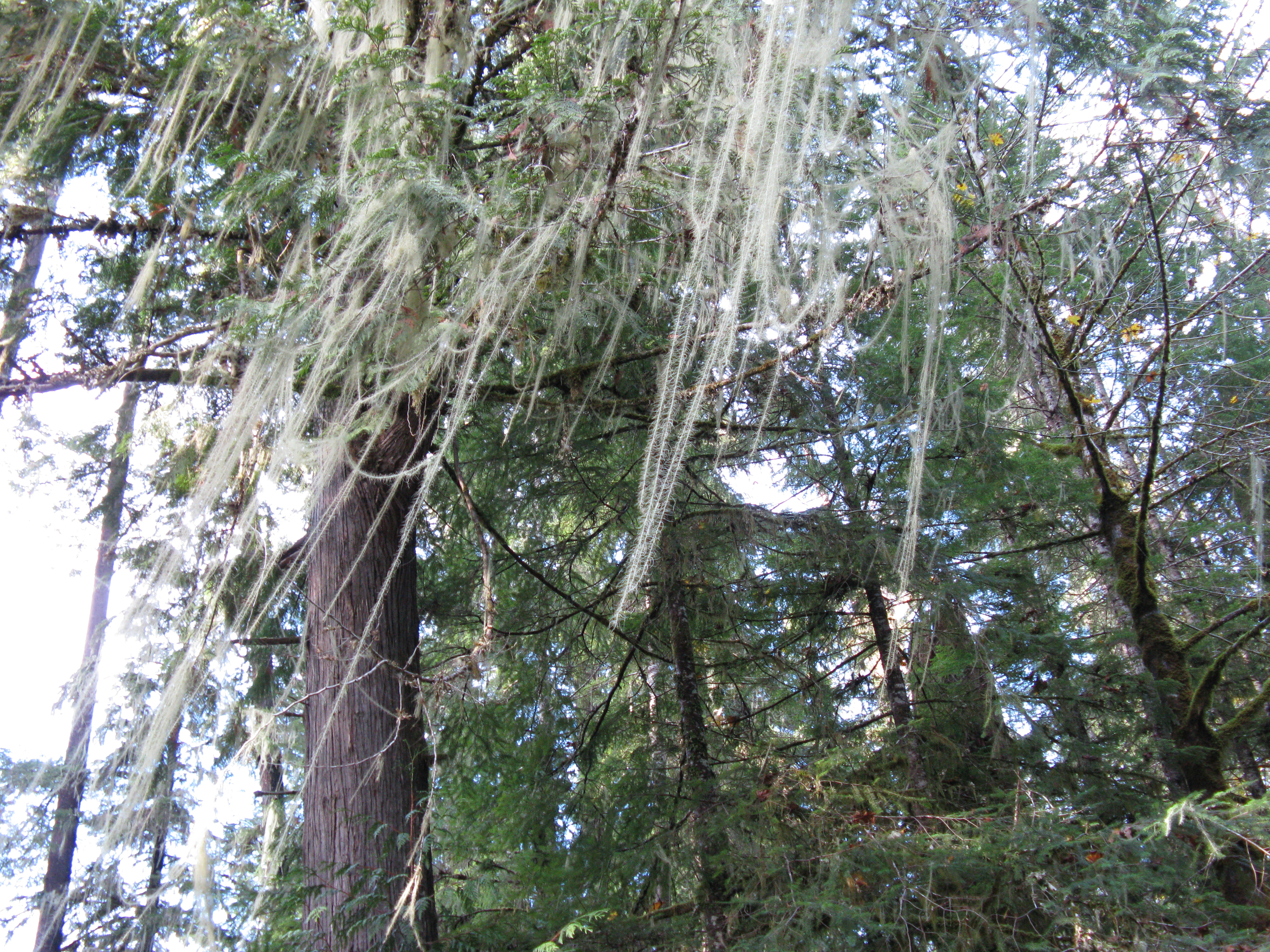
- Dolichousnea longissima in a coniferous forest in Washington (state), USA

Scientific classification
- Domain: Eukaryota
- Kingdom: Fungi
- Division: Ascomycota
- Class: Lecanoromycetes
- Order: Lecanorales
- Family: Parmeliaceae
- Genus: Dolichousnea (Y.Ohmura) Articus (2004)

Type species
- Usnea longissima Ach. (1810)

Species
- D. diffracta D. longissima D. trichodeoides

Synonyms
- Usnea subgen. Dolichousnea Y.Ohmura (2001)

= Dolichousnea =

Genus of lichen

Dolichousnea is a genus of fruticose lichens in the family Parmeliaceae. It has three species. The widely distributed type species, Dolichousnea longissima, is found in boreal regions of Asia, Europe, and North America.

== Taxonomy ==
Dolichousnea was originally circumscribed as a subgenus of the large genus Usnea, by Japanese lichenologist Yoshihito Ohmura in 2001. He considered that it was possible to treat the three taxa as a genus, but thought it more suitable to treat Dolichousnea at the rank of subgenus, because the taxa have the synapomorphies of the genus Usnea: a fruticose thallus, a central cartilaginous axis throughout the thallus, and the presence of usnic acid in the cortex. In 2004, Kristina Articus proposed to raise the subgenus to generic rank, a decision that was accepted in later analyses.

== Description ==
Dolichousnea lichens have a pendent thallus, in which all the branches hang downward. The branching is isotomic-dichotomous, meaning that the thallus divides into isotomic (i.e. dividing a line at points equally distant from its opposite ends) branches of more or less equal thickness. One of the characteristics of Dolichousnea are the presence of annular-pseudocyphellae between segments. These are pseudocyphellae that resemble annular cracks, but the space between segments is swollen and surrounded by maculae (white spots on branch surface that form when the cortex tissue is thin). These pseudocyphellae differ from physical cracks, and seem to be formed due to pressure from the medullary hyphae beneath the cortex. Dolichousnea has a thicker hypothecium (a layer of dense hyphal tissue just below the hymenium) than other subgenera of Usnea, typically measuring 100–160 μm; in contrast, subgenera Usnea and Eumitria range over 30–60 μm. Another characteristic of Dolichousnea is a positive iodine reaction in its axis.

== Species ==
- Dolichousnea diffracta (Vain.) Articus (2004) – East Asia
- Dolichousnea longissima (Ach.) Articus (2004) – boreal regions of Asia, Europe, North America
- Dolichousnea trichodeoides (Vain. ex Motyka) Articus (2004) – East Africa; Asia; Australia; Europe

Recent (2020) molecular phylogenetic analysis suggests that the taxon Dolichousnea trichodeoides represent an unresolved species complex.
