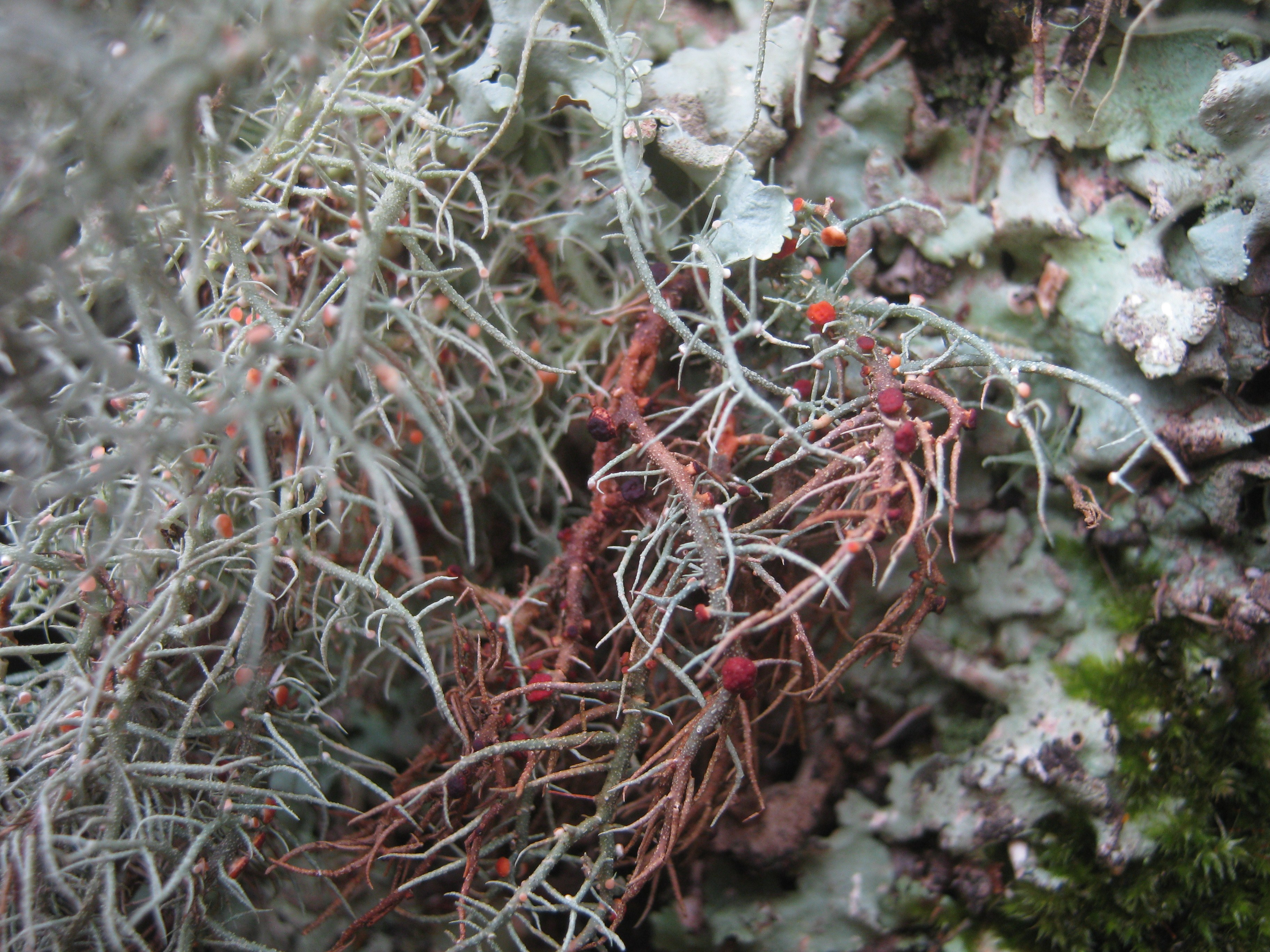
- Biatoropsis usnearum

Scientific classification
- Kingdom: Fungi
- Division: Basidiomycota
- Class: Tremellomycetes
- Order: Tremellales
- Genus: Biatoropsis; Räsänen (1934)

Type species
- Biatoropsis usnearum Räsänen (1934)

= Biatoropsis =

Genus of fungi

Biatoropsis is a genus of lichenicolous (lichen-dwelling) fungi of uncertain familial placement in the order Tremellales. It comprises 11 species that parasitise various species in the fruticose lichen genera Usnea and Protousnea.

== Taxonomy ==
The genus was circumscribed in 1935 by the Finnish lichenologist Veli Räsänen, who assigned Biatoropsis usnearum as the type species. The genus remained monospecific for several decades, until research, starting in the 1990s, showed that B. usnearum represented a species complex. Since then another ten species have been added to the genus.

== Description ==
Biatoropsis is a genus of fungi that parasitises lichens (making it lichenicolous). The fungus produces reproductive structures called basidiomata that vary in both shape and colour, with a waxy-gelatinous texture similar to jelly.

At a microscopic level, the internal tissue (context) consists of thread-like cells called hyphae that lack specialised connecting structures known as clamps. The fungus penetrates its host using specialised feeding structures called haustoria, which have a distinctive twisted or convoluted form characteristic of the Tremellales order of fungi. The reproductive surface (hymenium) contains numerous immature spore-producing cells called probasidia. These initially develop in a club-shaped form and may or may not have a clamp at their base. Unlike some related fungi, Biatoropsis lacks specialised sterile cells called hyphidia and cystidia in its hymenium.

When fully mature, the spore-producing cells (basidia) are club-shaped to almost cylindrical and divided by cross-walls (septa). These cells develop extensions called epibasidia that are roughly cylindrical in shape. The spores (basidiospores) they produce are nearly spherical to elliptical in shape and have a distinctive side projection called an apiculus. When these spores germinate, they do so by producing a tube-like growth.

The fungus can also reproduce asexually in several ways. It commonly produces chains of spores called catenulate conidia. In one rare observation, crescent-shaped (lunate) conidia were documented. In one species of Biatoropsis, the basidia themselves can function as cells that produce asexual spores – these spores are colourless and lack internal divisions.

All species in the genus parasitise species of the fruticose lichen genera Usnea and Protousnea, causing gall-like symptoms in infected species.

== Species ==
As of December 2024, Species Fungorum (in the Catalogue of Life) accepts 11 species of Biatoropsis:

- Biatoropsis angulatae Diederich & Millanes (2022)
- Biatoropsis antarcticae Diederich, Etayo & Millanes (2022)
- Biatoropsis hafellneri Millanes, Diederich, M.Westb. & Wedin (2016)
- Biatoropsis hirtae Diederich & Millanes (2022)
- Biatoropsis macaronesica Diederich & Millanes (2022)
- Biatoropsis millanesiana Diederich & Wedin (2020)
- Biatoropsis minuta Millanes, Diederich, M.Westb. & Wedin (2016)
- Biatoropsis nigrescens Diederich, Millanes & F.Berger (2022)
- Biatoropsis protousneae Millanes, Diederich, M.Westb. & Wedin (2016)
- Biatoropsis rubicundae Diederich & Millanes (2022)
- Biatoropsis usnearum Räsänen (1934)
