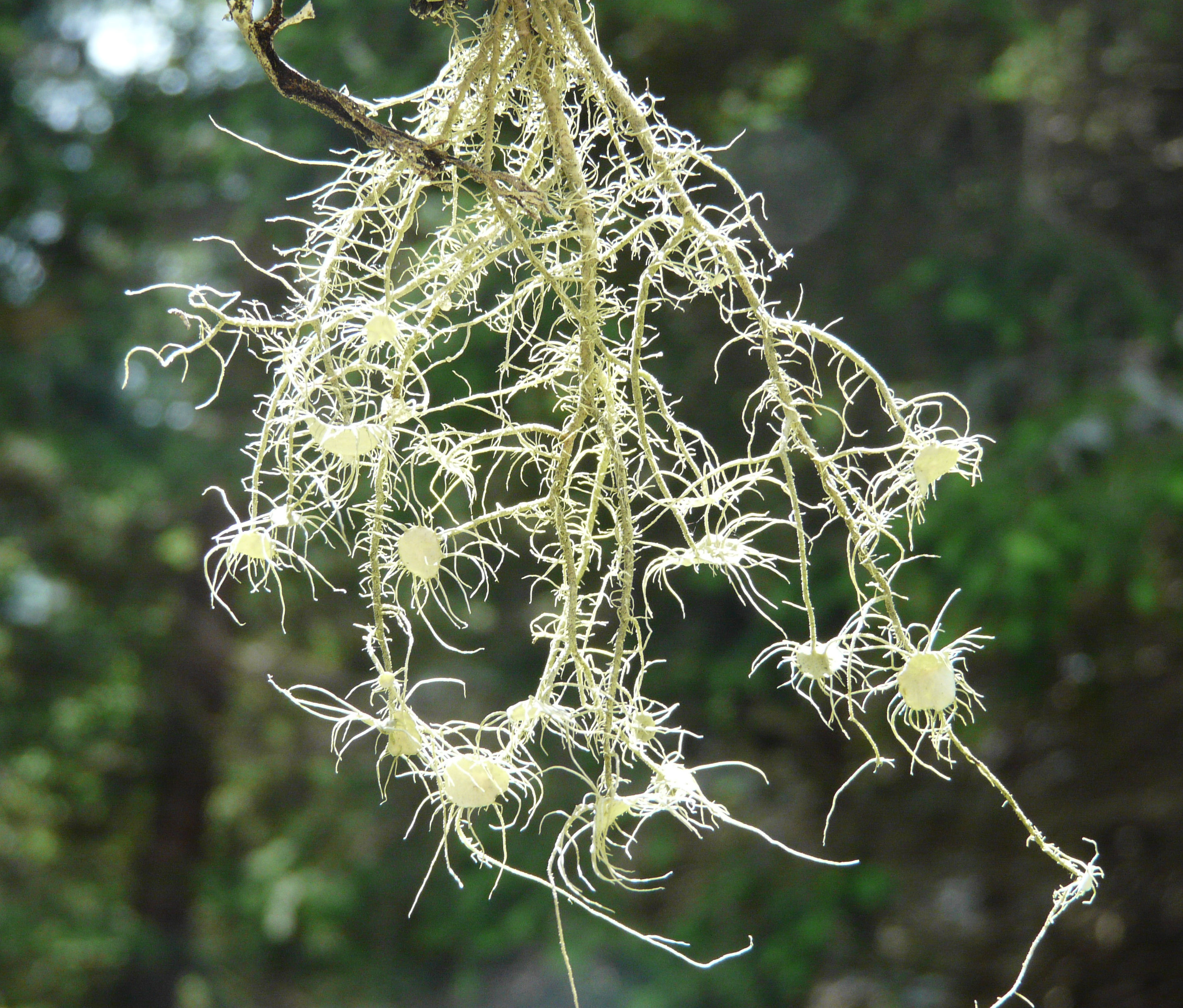

Scientific classification
- Kingdom: Fungi
- Division: Ascomycota
- Class: Lecanoromycetes
- Order: Lecanorales
- Family: Parmeliaceae
- Genus: Usnea
- Species: U. florida

Binomial name
- Usnea florida (L.) F.H.Wigg. (1780)

Synonyms
- List: Lichen floridus L. (1753); Parmelia barbata f. florida (L.) Schaer. (1840); Parmelia barbata var. florida (L.) Spreng. (1832); Parmelia florida (L.) Spreng. (1827); Usnea barbata f. florida (L.) Rabenh. (1845); Usnea barbata subsp. florida (L.) Vain. (1890); Usnea barbata subvar. florida (L.) Wawra (1852); Usnea barbata var. florida (L.) Fr. (1831); Usnea plicata var. florida (L.) Link (1833)

= Usnea florida =

Species of lichen-forming fungus

Usnea florida is a species of beard lichen in the family Parmeliaceae. First described by Carl Linnaeus in 1753 and later reclassified by Friedrich Heinrich Wiggers in 1780, it is a shrubby, upright lichen growing 2–10 cm tall with slender, curved branches covered in papillae and fibrils, and distinctive disc-shaped reproductive structures (apothecia) surrounded by branching filaments. Its development progresses through eleven distinct states across four main periods, beginning with the union of fungal spores and compatible algae to form a protothallus, followed by branching processes that create its characteristic bushy structure, and eventually producing reproductive apothecia in its generative stages.

The lichen predominantly colonises smaller branches and twigs in the upper canopy of broad-leaved trees in well-lit environments, particularly in mountain forests that experience frequent fog. Despite being locally common in certain regions of Europe, including southern and western Britain, the Polish Eastern Carpathians, and Italian mountain forests from the Alps to Sicily, populations of Usnea florida are declining due to elevated atmospheric ammonia concentrations, resulting in critically endangered status in several European countries.

== Taxonomy ==
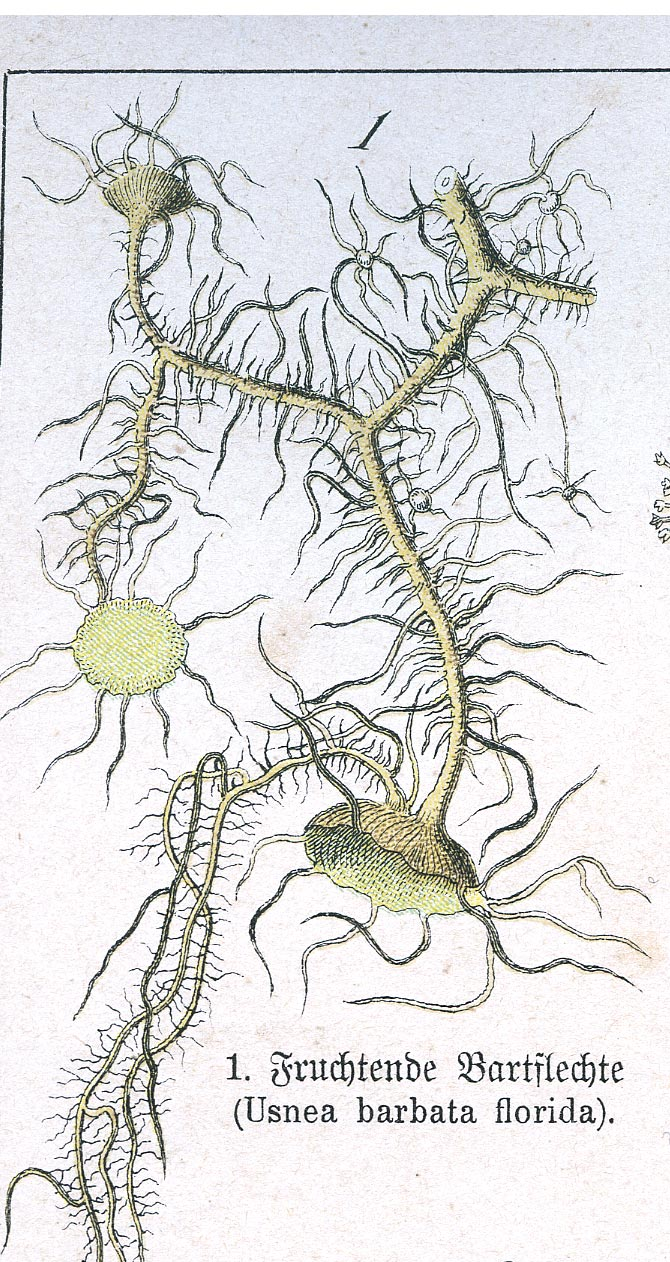
Illustration of Usnea florida in Wiggers's 1780 Naturgeschichte des Pflanzenreichs

The lichen was first described by Carl Linnaeus in his 1753 work Species Plantarum. In his original description, Linnaeus characterised the species as filamentous, branched, and erect, with radiating, shield-like fruiting structures (scutellis radiatis). He noted its similarity to common Usnea ("Usnea vulgatissima"), but remarked that it was thinner and shorter, with orbicular (rounded) apothecia (fruiting bodies). Linnaeus reported the habitat of Usnea florida simply as growing in beech forests (fagetis) in Europe. The German botanist Friedrich Heinrich Wiggers transferred the taxon to the genus Usnea in 1780.

Modern genetic analyses have challenged the traditional taxonomic distinction between Usnea florida and a closely related species, Usnea subfloridana. Although these two lichens differ clearly in their appearance and mode of reproduction—U. florida primarily reproduces sexually through fungal spores produced in disc-like structures (apothecia), whereas U. subfloridana reproduces mainly asexually through vegetative propagules (soredia)—molecular studies have struggled to confirm them as genetically distinct species. Studies using DNA sequencing methods consistently show that these two lichens are phylogenetically very closely related, forming a single genetic cluster that intermixes specimens from both species.

A recent (2020) investigation using fungal-specific microsatellite markers—small repetitive DNA sequences useful for detecting subtle genetic differences—also found minimal genetic differentiation between populations of U. florida and U. subfloridana. Genetic analyses showed high levels of genetic mixing and gene flow between these two nominally separate species. Populations studied from northern and eastern Europe, including Estonia, Latvia, Russia, and Belarus, did not show clear genetic boundaries aligning with their supposed morphological or reproductive differences.

Despite the low genetic distinction, some slight but statistically significant genetic differences were still observed between the two taxa, indicating that while gene flow occurs or has occurred historically, there might currently be some degree of reproductive isolation. This genetic evidence supports the interpretation that U. florida and U. subfloridana may represent species in the early stages of evolutionary divergence—known as a "young species complex"—where clear genetic separation has not yet fully developed.

Given these findings, researchers have called for further investigation using advanced genomic techniques, which might provide better resolution and clarify whether these lichens should continue to be considered separate species. Resolving this taxonomic uncertainty has practical importance, particularly in conservation biology, as Usnea florida is classified as threatened or near-threatened in several European regions, whereas U. subfloridana is widespread and relatively common. Accurate species delimitation is crucial for making informed conservation decisions.

== Description ==
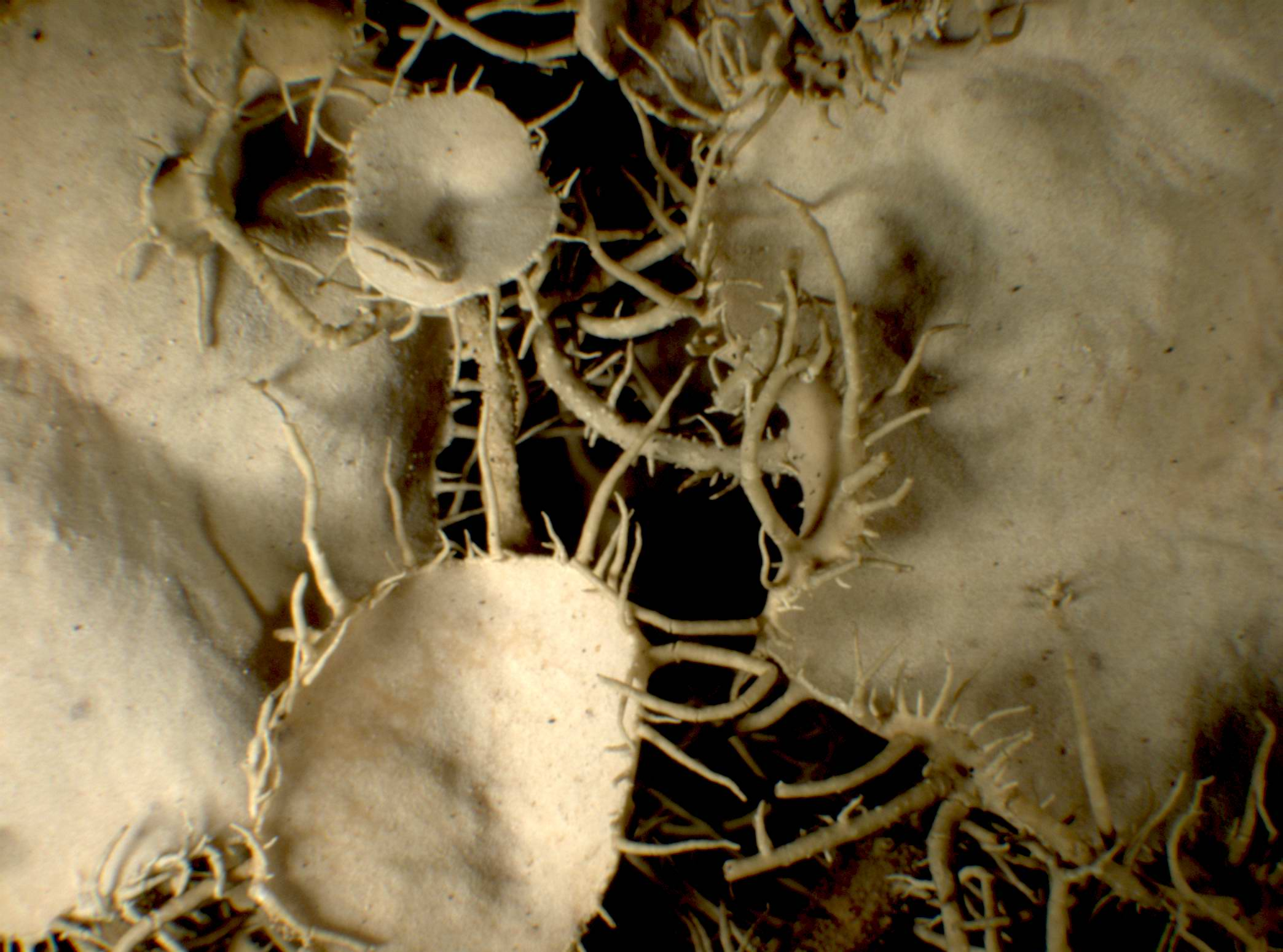
Closeup of apothecia of a herbarium specimen showing fibrils around the disc

Usnea florida is a shrubby (fruticose), upright lichen typically growing to heights between 2 and 5 cm, though occasionally reaching up to 10 cm. It often forms compact, bush-like clusters. The main branches of its thallus—the vegetative body of the lichen—are relatively slender, about 1 mm in diameter, and are frequently curved or irregularly twisted. These branches may show subtle, ring-like markings known as annulations. The thinner secondary branches are often distinctly contorted, giving the lichen a tangled appearance. The overall colour of the thallus is a grey-green shade, gradually darkening to black near its base.

Covering the primary branches are numerous tiny projections called papillae, which are short and densely packed, giving a slightly roughened texture. Additionally, longer, hair-like structures called fibrils extend outward from the branches. These fibrils typically reach lengths up to 1 cm and usually emerge at right angles from the branches before becoming gently curved or curled, enhancing the tufted appearance of the species.

Reproductive structures, known as apothecia, commonly appear at the tips of the main and larger side branches. These apothecia are initially concave discs measuring from 0.5 to 1 cm across, later flattening as they mature. The surfaces of these reproductive discs can range from smooth to somewhat wrinkled. Prominently surrounding each disc are numerous slender, fibril-like extensions, often branching themselves, and growing up to 5 mm long, giving a fringed look to the apothecia.

Microscopically, the spores (ascospores) of Usnea florida are oval or ellipsoid, typically measuring from 8.5 to 11 micrometres (μm) long and 5.5 to 7 wide. Chemically, the medulla—the innermost layer of tissue within the thallus—responds distinctively to certain chemical spot test reagents, turning yellow when potassium hydroxide solution (K) is applied, and orange with p-phenylenediamine (Pd). These reactions help identify the presence of specific secondary metabolites (lichen products), primarily thamnolic acid, and occasionally alectorialic acid, the latter mainly occurring in the apothecia.

== Development ==
The developmental process, or ontogeny, of Usnea florida has been detailed through careful studies of its morphology, beginning from its initial formation as an ascospore. Ontogeny refers to the sequence of events involved in the growth and development of an organism. In U. florida, ontogeny consists of four main periods which are further subdivided into eleven distinct developmental states. Initially, the fungal spore germinates, producing a fine network of fungal filaments known as hyphae. These hyphae subsequently join together with compatible algae, forming the primary structure of the lichen, termed a protothallus. The early life of U. florida, like other lichens, is particularly fragile, and the successful union between fungus and algae is critical for its survival and continued development.

As the lichen progresses from its early stages, it forms a recognisable bushy or fruticose structure through branching processes. The thallus, which is the body of the lichen, transitions through several distinct growth stages. Initially, the immature thallus has simple dichotomous branching—where each branch regularly splits into two. Gradually, the lichen enters a virginal state in which branching becomes more intricate and features characteristic papillae—tiny raised structures on the surface of the thallus. Over time, these papillae develop further, giving rise to small projections known as fibrils. Some fibrils remain short and unbranched, while others grow and form new branches. At this stage, the thallus takes on its mature, intricately branched appearance typical of Usnea lichens.

Reproductive structures, specifically apothecia, which are small disc-shaped fruiting bodies, develop on U. florida as the lichen enters its generative stages. These structures are critical for dispersal as they produce fungal spores. Initially, apothecia possess deeply concave discs surrounded by rings of fibrils; however, as the lichen matures, these discs become shallower and flatter. The formation of apothecia typically occurs after the thallus has undergone significant vegetative growth and established its branching framework. Signs of ageing and deterioration in the form of blackening and dying branches can be observed even before the reproductive phase begins, with these degenerative processes accelerating in the later developmental states.

Environmental conditions significantly influence the developmental trajectory of U. florida. Adverse or stressful conditions may lead to delayed or accelerated morphogenesis—the process through which the lichen attains its specific shape and structure. Under harsh environments, such as extreme cold or exposure to excessive sunlight, U. florida may show adaptations including slower growth rates or altered morphologies. These adaptations serve as mechanisms to cope with environmental stress. In certain instances, lichens bypass their typical generative phase completely, transitioning directly to ageing or postgenerative stages characterised by extensive branch dieback and loss of reproductive structures.

== Habitat, distribution, and ecology ==
In the United Kingdom, Usnea florida predominantly colonises smaller branches and twigs in the upper canopy of broad-leaved trees, rarely appearing on trunks. Occasionally, this lichen establishes itself on shrubs, wooden fences, or fence-posts. It thrives particularly in open, light-abundant environments. While locally common in certain regions, populations are experiencing decline, potentially due to elevated atmospheric ammonia concentrations. Its geographical range centres mainly on southern and western Britain, with isolated occurrences in southern Scotland, where it is considered scarce.

Studies have confirmed the presence of Usnea florida in the Polish Eastern Carpathians within the Bieszczady National Park, where it grows epiphytically (on tree bark) at elevations ranging from 800 to 880 metres. Although historically reported from additional localities nearby, these older records were not rediscovered in modern surveys. In Italy, U. florida is adapted to cooler climates, typically inhabiting mountain forests that experience frequent fog. It primarily grows on small branches and twigs, thriving particularly well in the upper montane and subalpine zones. Its Italian distribution stretches widely, ranging from the Alps in the north all the way down through the peninsula to the mountainous regions of Sicily.

Usnea florida commonly occurs on the bark of beech (Fagus sylvatica), aspen (Populus tremula), and birch (Betula spp.), often growing high in tree crowns where humidity and exposure to sunlight are favourable. Such elevated habitats explain why this species has frequently been overlooked in ground-level surveys and may be more widespread in suitable habitats than previously documented.

== Conservation ==
Usnea florida is considered a threatened or vulnerable species in several European countries. In Poland, Usnea florida is classified as critically endangered (CR), with only a few current populations known from protected areas such as the Białowieża Forest and the Bieszczady National Park. Intensive lichenological surveys since the late 1980s indicated it had been locally extinct in the Eastern Carpathians until recent rediscoveries highlighted its continued but limited presence.

== See also ==
- List of lichens named by Carl Linnaeus
- List of Usnea species
