= Usnea glabrata =

Conservation status
- Secure (NatureServe)

Scientific classification
- Kingdom: Fungi
- Division: Ascomycota
- Class: Lecanoromycetes
- Order: Lecanorales
- Family: Parmeliaceae
- Genus: Usnea
- Species: U. glabrata

Binomial name
- Usnea glabrata (Ach.) Vain. (1915)

Synonyms
- List: Usnea plicata var. glabrata Ach. (1810); Usnea plicata f. glabrata (Ach.) Ach. (1814); Usnea articulata f. glabrata (Ach.) Zahlbr. (1930); Parmelia barbata var. erecta Schaer. (1840); Usnea barbata var. erecta Rabenh. (1845); Usnea barbata f. erecta Schaer. (1850); Usnea articulata f. erecta (Schaer.) Stein (1883); Usnea erecta (Schaer.) Motyka (1937); Usnea plicata f. erecta Kremp. (1861); Usnea barbata var. sorediifera Arnold (1875); Usnea barbata f. sorediifera (Arnold) Arnold (1884); Usnea florida var. sorediifera (Arnold) Hue (1900); Usnea hirta var. sorediifera (Arnold) Jatta (1909); Usnea sorediifera (Arnold) Lynge (1921)

Species of beard lichen

Usnea glabrata, the lustrous beard lichen, is a species of beard lichen in the family Parmeliaceae. This small, shrubby species typically grows 5–10 centimetres tall. Distinguished by its somewhat shiny surface, slender branches that taper at both ends, and the presence of powdery reproductive structures near the branch tips, this lichen primarily grows on tree bark in moderately open, humid forests throughout boreal and temperate regions of the Northern Hemisphere. U. glabrata is considered vulnerable in parts of its range due to its small size making it easy to overlook and its relatively sparse collection in recent decades.

== Taxonomy ==
It was first described as a variety of Usnea plicata by Erik Acharius. Finnish lichenologist Edvard August Vainio transferred it to the genus Usnea in 1915. Key distinguishing characters of the species are the small shrubby thallus, constriction of secondary branches at their base, presence of large soralia, and the absence of both papillae and isidia.

In North America, it is commonly known as the "lustrous beard lichen".

== Description ==
Usnea glabrata forms a small, erect thallus (body) that typically reaches up to 5–10 cm in height. The thallus is sparsely to densely branched, with the branching pattern primarily anisotomic-dichotomous (where dividing branches are unequal in thickness). The branches are generally slender, measuring up to 1.5–1.8 mm in diameter, and are characteristically inflated with a somewhat swollen appearance. They often display foveoles (small pit-like depressions on the surface) and are typically constricted or fusiform (tapering at both ends) at their bases. Branch tips commonly curve backwards.

The surface of U. glabrata has a somewhat shiny appearance, which distinguishes it from many other Usnea species that have a matt surface. This feature is typical for species in the U. fragilescens group. The cortex (outer protective layer) is thin, comprising only 4–5–7% of the branch radius. The medulla (inner layer) is loosely structured with an arachnoid (cobweb-like) texture and is relatively thick, making up 32–36–39% of the branch radius. The central axis (core strand) is thin, constituting 13–18–23% of the branch diameter.

Annular cracks (ring-like breaks in the cortex) are normally sparse and slightly constricted, occasionally featuring thin, everted medullary rings (where the inner tissue protrudes through the cracks). The base of the thallus is typically constricted to fusiform and ranges from pale to slightly blackened in colour.

One of the distinctive features of U. glabrata is the general absence of papillae (wart-like protrusions), which may occasionally appear as low and sparse structures, but are very rarely tall and numerous. Fibrils (small, hair-like branches) are usually abundant.

The reproductive structures called soralia typically develop near the branch tips. These soralia are tuberculate (having small rounded protuberances) to distinctly excavate (hollowed out), especially in older specimens preserved in herbaria. They are relatively large and often become confluent (merging). Soralia develop either from flat areas of the cortex or from tubercles, producing granular soredia (powdery propagules for asexual reproduction). Isidia (another type of vegetative propagule) are absent, although isidia-like spinules occasionally appear on the soralia.

== Habitat and distribution ==
Usnea glabrata is primarily an epiphytic lichen, growing on the bark of various tree species. In East Fennoscandia, it has been documented most frequently on alder, followed by spruce, birch, and willow, with occasional occurrences on Populus and Sorbus. The species typically inhabits moderately open and humid mixed forests. It often occurs along the shores of water bodies and can also be found in inhabited areas.

Regarding its geographical distribution, U. glabrata has a circumpolar range in boreal and temperate regions, showing continental tendencies in its distribution pattern. Despite its distinctive morphology that should make field identification relatively straightforward, the species may be overlooked due to its small size. Globally, U. glabrata belongs to the U. fragilescens aggregate, a group whose members typically show oceanic or partially oceanic distribution tendencies, though U. glabrata itself displays more continental characteristics. Within Fennoscandia, the species has a distinctly southeastern distribution, being rare or absent from more northern regions. In Finland, it is mainly confined to the provinces of Pohjois-Savo and Pohjois-Karjala, while in Russia it occurs in several parts of the Republic of Karelia and adjacent areas. Although U. glabrata is morphologically distinctive, its small stature makes it easy to overlook in the field. Collections have been sparse in recent decades, leading to its classification as a vulnerable species in both Finland and the Republic of Karelia.

== See also ==
- List of Usnea species
