= Aspergillus neocarnoyi =

Scientific classification
- Kingdom: Fungi
- Division: Ascomycota
- Class: Eurotiomycetes
- Order: Eurotiales
- Family: Aspergillaceae
- Genus: Aspergillus
- Species: A. neocarnoyi

Binomial name
- Aspergillus neocarnoyi Kozakiewicz (1989)

Synonyms
- Eurotium carnoyi Malloch & Cain (1972) [teleomorph]

Species of fungus

Aspergillus neocarnoyi is a species of fungus in the genus Aspergillus. It is from the Aspergillus section. The species was first described in 1989. It has been reported to produce asperentins, asperflavin, auroglaucin, a bisanthron, dihydroauroglaucin, echinulins, flavoglaucin, neoechinulins, questin, questinol, tetracyclic, and tetrahydroauroglaucin.

== Growth and morphology ==
A. neocarnoyi has been cultivated on both Czapek yeast extract agar (CYA) plates and Malt Extract Agar Oxoid® (MEAOX) plates. The growth morphology of the colonies can be seen in the pictures below.

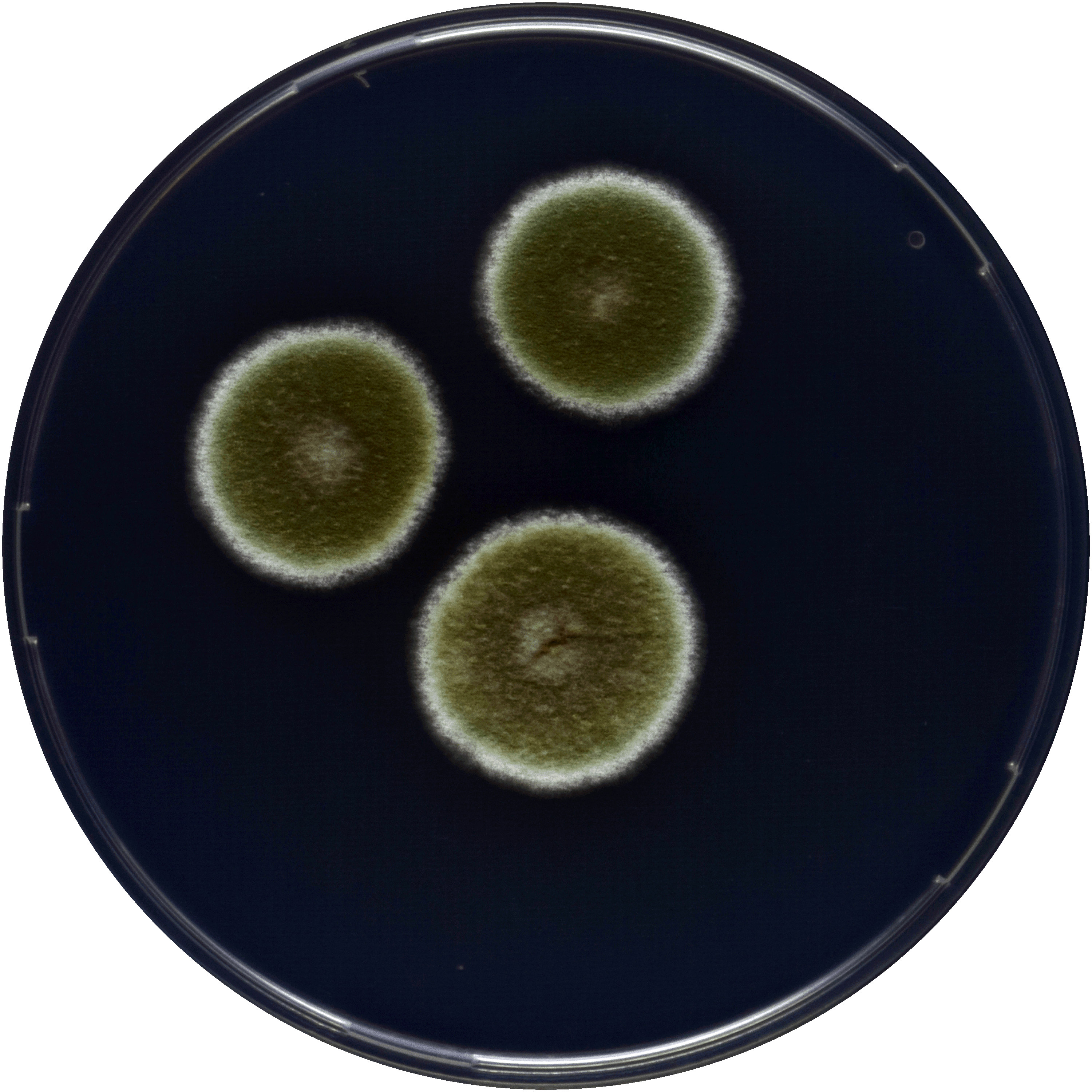
Aspergillus neocarnoyi growing on CYA plate

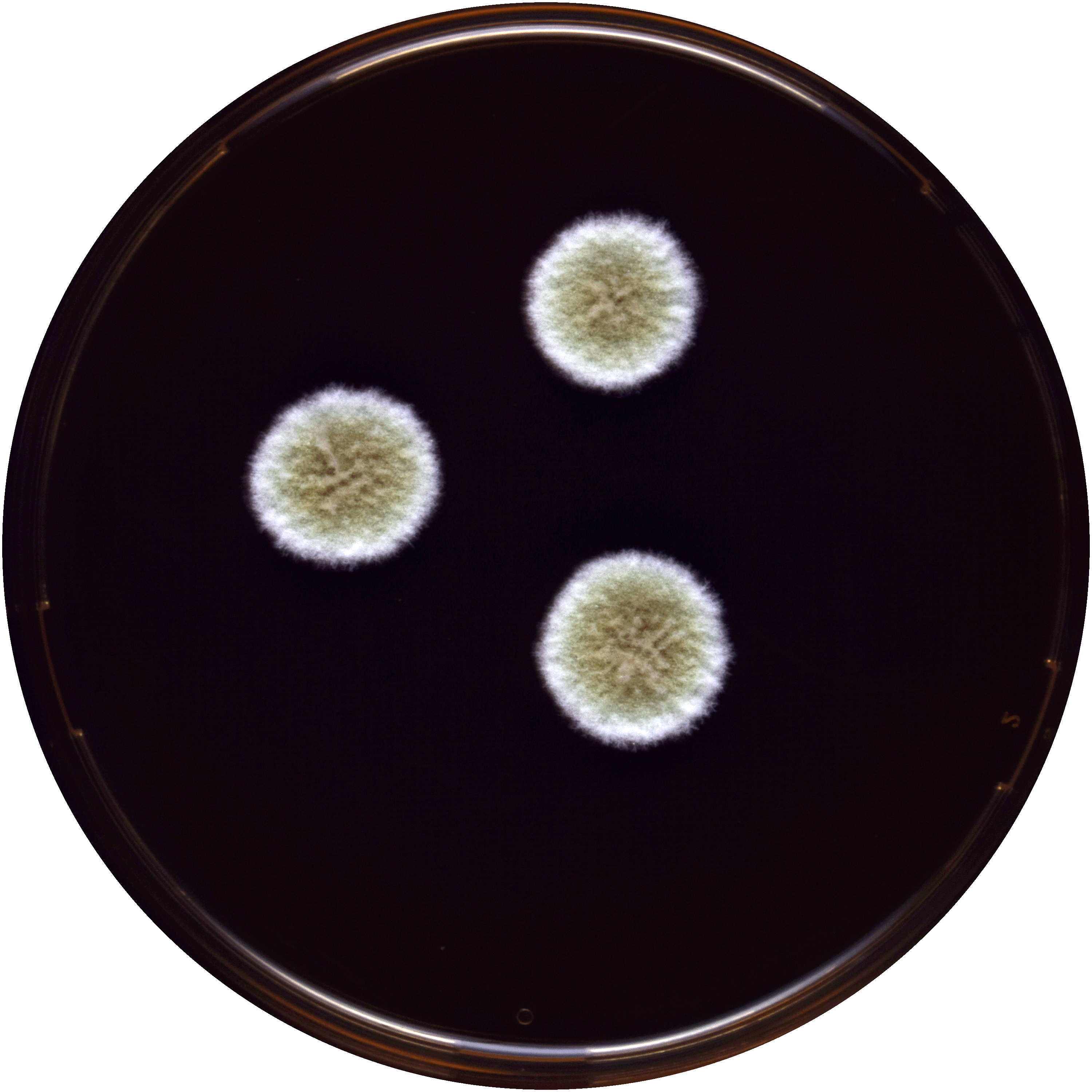
Aspergillus neocarnoyi growing on MEAOX plate
