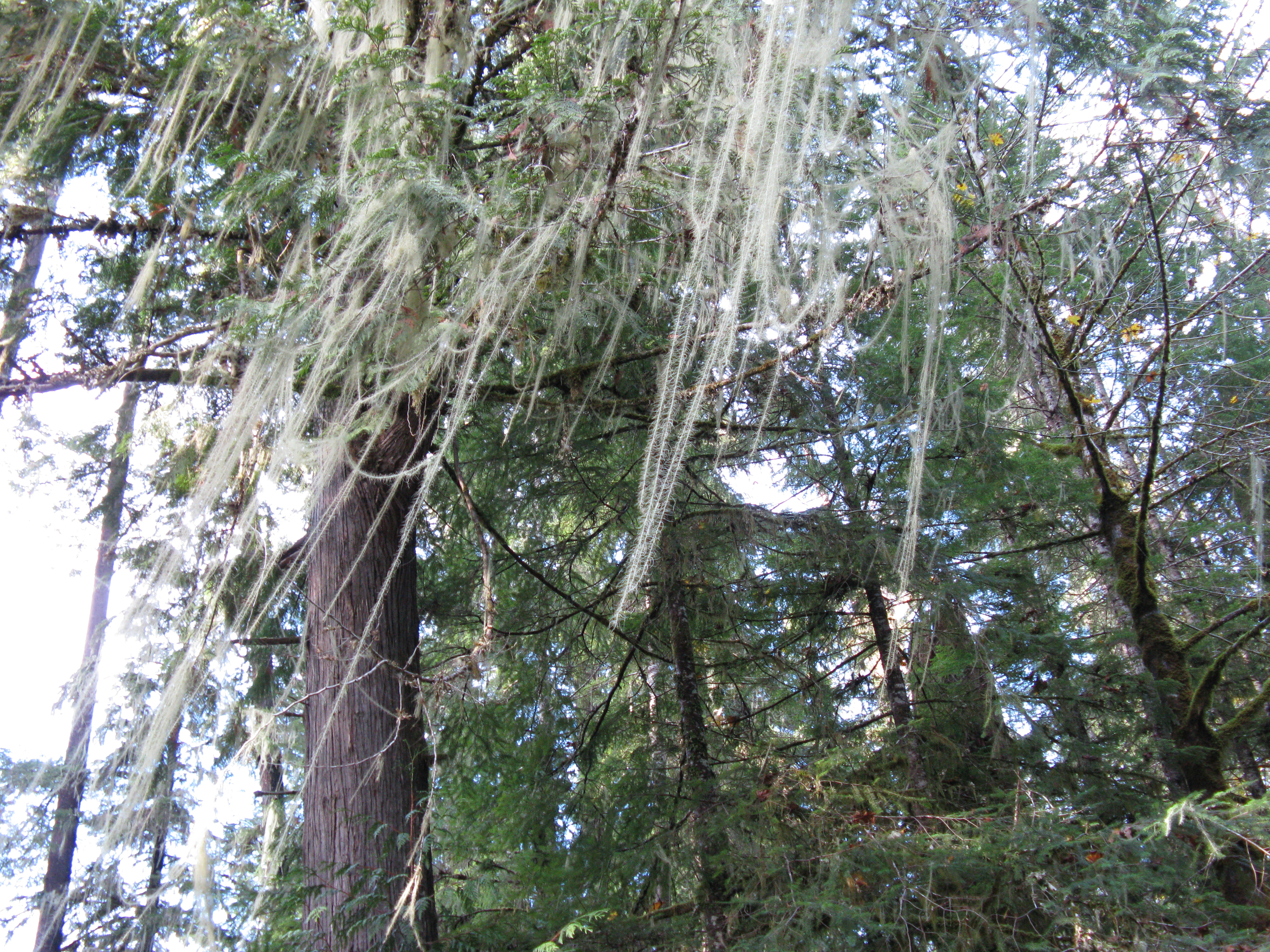

Conservation status
- Secure (NatureServe)

Scientific classification
- Kingdom: Fungi
- Division: Ascomycota
- Class: Lecanoromycetes
- Order: Lecanorales
- Family: Parmeliaceae
- Genus: Dolichousnea
- Species: D. longissima

Binomial name
- Dolichousnea longissima (Ach.) Articus (2004)

Synonyms
- Parmelia coralloidea var. longissima (Ach.) Spreng. (1827); Parmelia longissima (Ach.) Spreng. (1827); Usnea barbata var. longissima (Ach.) Schaer. (1850); Usnea longissima Ach. (1810)

= Dolichousnea longissima =

Methuselah's beard lichen

Species of lichen-forming fungus

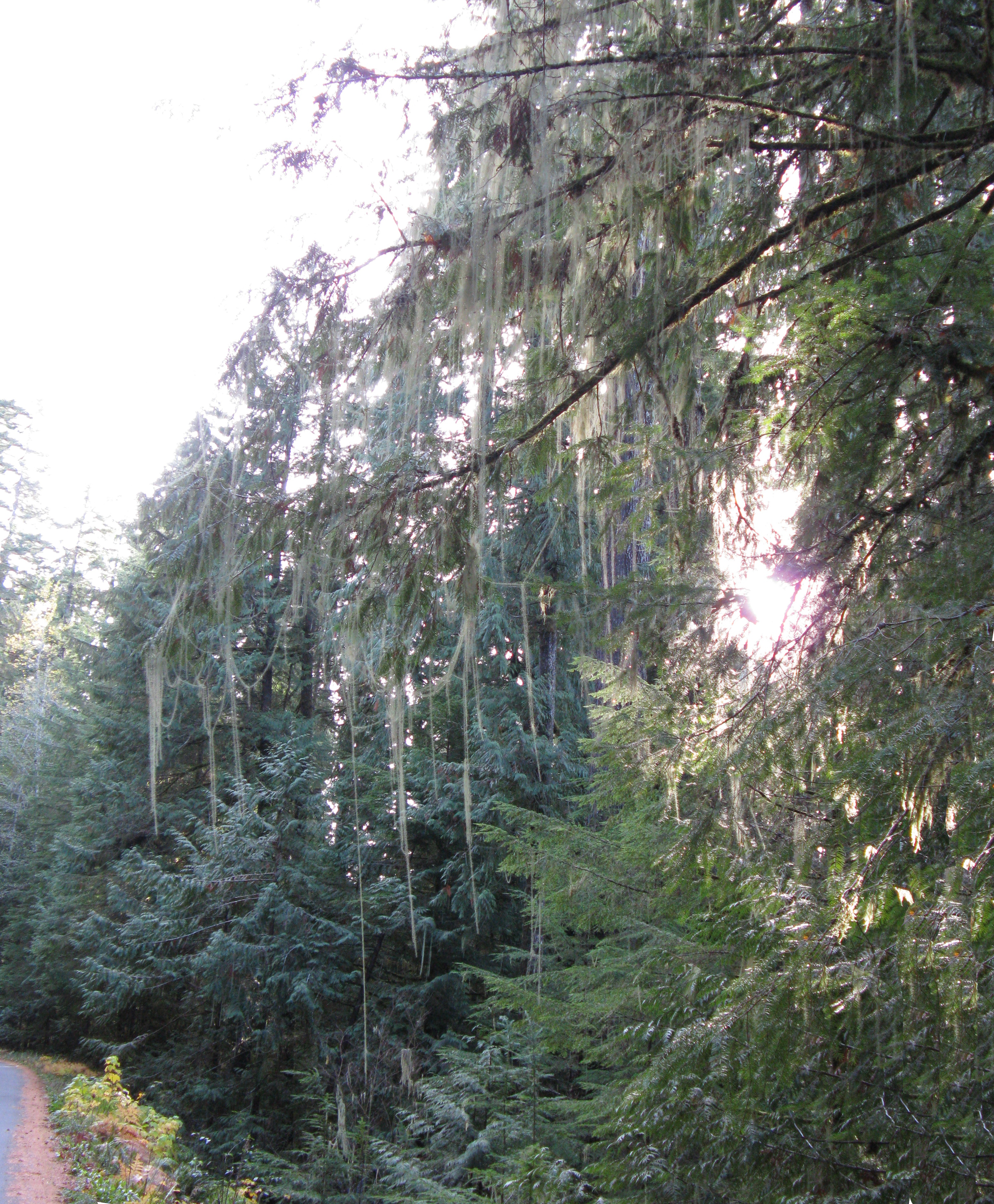
Growing on a conifer in the hills north of Mount St. Helens, showing the leaf-like side-branches and pendent "stems", some of them several metres long

Dolichousnea longissima (syn. Usnea longissima), commonly known by the names old man's beard or Methuselah's beard lichen, is a fruticose lichen in the family Parmeliaceae.

== Description ==
This lichen is fruticose, with very long stems and short, even side branches. It is considered the longest lichen in the world. The stems are usually 15 to 30 cm in length but are sometimes much longer, growing to 3 metres long. It is pale green to silvery-yellow. It has a distinct central cord, which is white.

Dolichousnea longissima reproduces asexually predominantly through fragmentation. Spore-producing structures are rarely observed. It can double its length each year.

== Distribution ==
Dolichousnea longissima is found in boreal forests and coastal woodland in Europe, Asia, and North America. In North America, it is primarily found on the Pacific Coast, and the largest populations are concentrated in the Pacific Northwest. It ranges from Upper Midwest into Canada, the Great Lakes region, and extends to the coast of the Atlantic ocean. It was historically circumboreal, but has become regionally extinct from some areas of Europe and Scandinavia. It has been placed on the Red List of California Lichens, and is considered Endangered in the Norwegian Red List. In Nepal, D. longissima has been reported from 2,700 to 3,750 m elevation in a compilation of published records. In Italy, it is restricted to a handful of the most favourable locations in the Alps, and is listed as critically endangered in the Italian red list of epiphytic lichens.

The species grows within the canopies of coniferous trees, primarily those found in old growth coniferous forests in regions with high rainfall and humidity, and frequent fog. Air pollution heavily affects the metabolic functions of the species, and as a result, populations have declined. Industrial logging has also had detrimental impacts on population numbers.

== Human use ==
The species is harvested for decoration. It has also been historically used as a bedding and filtering material. Medicinally, D. longissima is known as an anti-inflammatory due to the presence of the compound longissiminone. It has been described in Chinese herbal medicine dating back to 500 A.D., where one of the names for the species translates to "pine gauze".

== See also ==
- Largest organisms
