= Georg Heinrich Weber =

German botanist, physician, and professor (1752–1828)

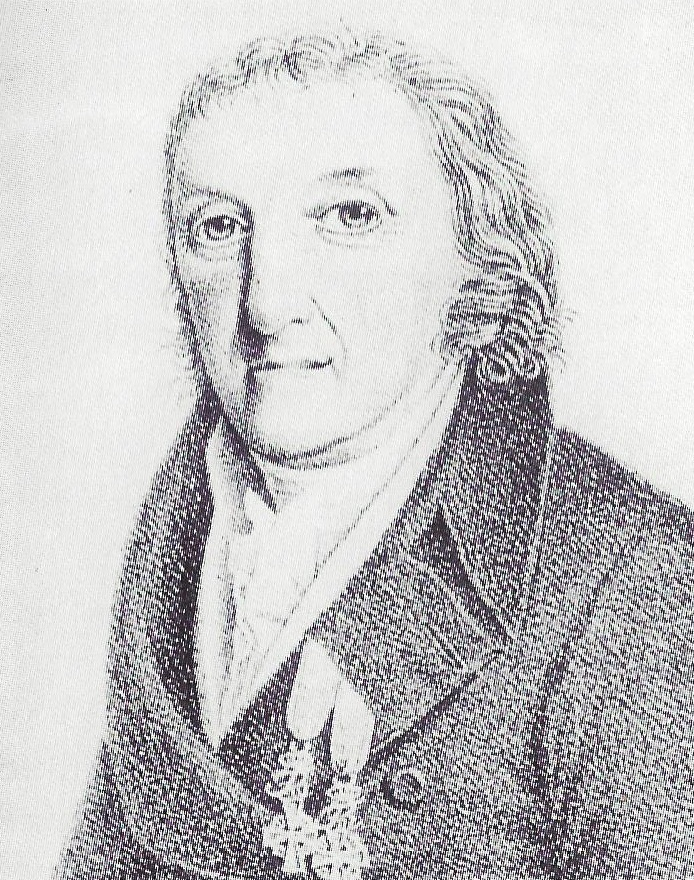
Georg Heinrich Weber

Georg Heinrich Weber (27 July 1752 Göttingen – 25 July 1828 Kiel) was a German botanist, medical doctor and professor at the University of Kiel. He was also the father of Friedrich Weber, the German entomologist.

In botany, Weber was known for his work on lichens, algae, and bryophytes in addition to seed plants.

== See also ==
- Category:Taxa named by Georg Heinrich Weber
