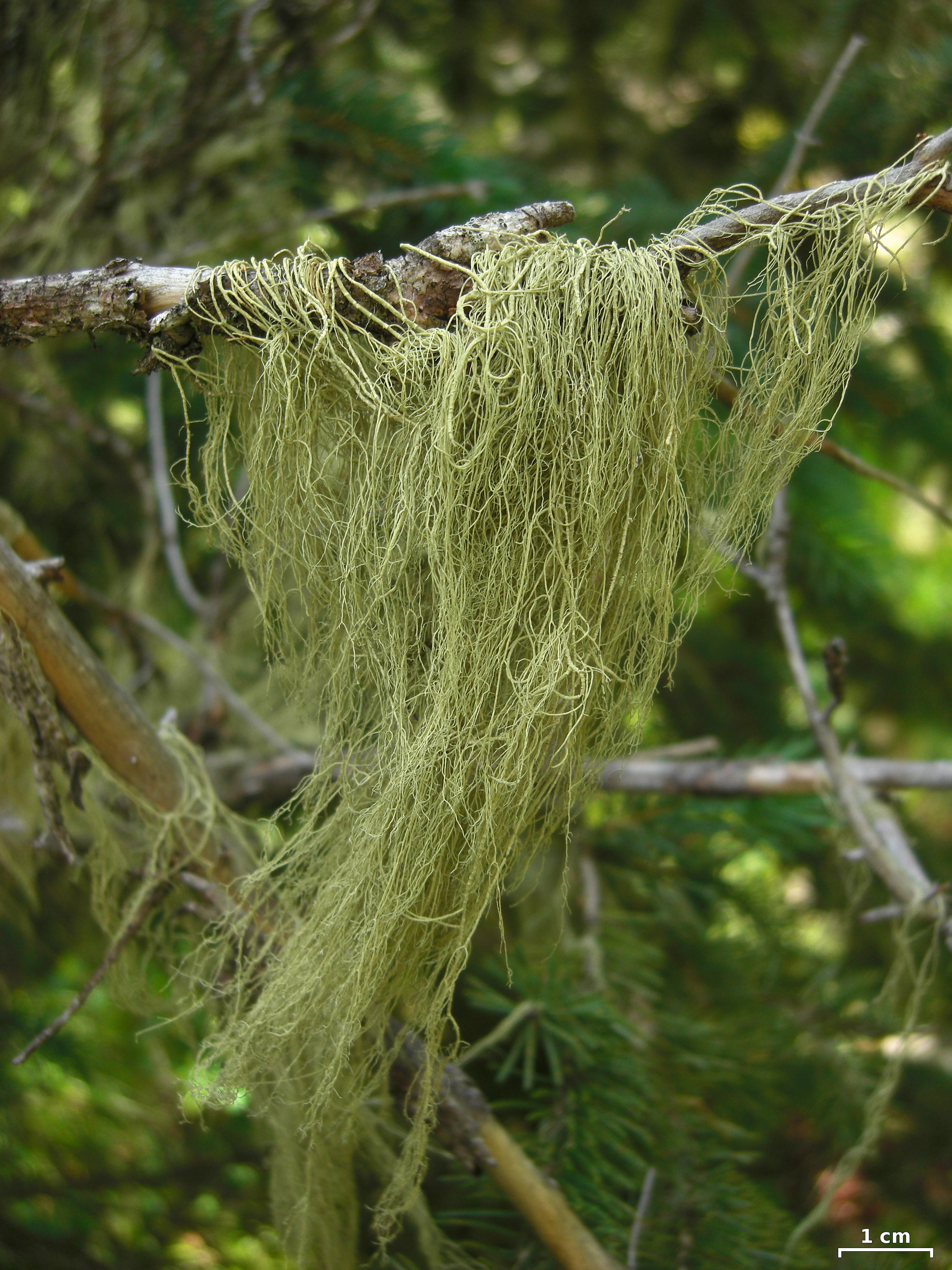
- Usnea cavernosa

Scientific classification
- Kingdom: Fungi
- Division: Ascomycota
- Class: Lecanoromycetes
- Order: Lecanorales
- Family: Parmeliaceae
- Genus: Usnea; Dill. ex. Adans. (1763)

Type species
- Usnea florida (L.) F.H.Wigg. (1780)

Species
- about 130 accepted species

Synonyms
- Alectoria Link (1833); Eumitria Stirt. (1881); Neuropogon Nees & Flot. (1834); Usneomyces E.A.Thomas ex Cif. & Tomas. (1953)

= Usnea =

Genus of lichens

Usnea is a genus of fruticose lichens in the large family Parmeliaceae. The genus, which currently contains roughly 130 species, was established by Michel Adanson in 1763. Species in the genus grow like leafless mini-shrubs or tassels anchored on bark or twigs. Members of the genus are commonly called old man's beard, beard lichen, or beard moss. Usnea lichens are characterized by their shrubby growth form, elastic branches with a central cord, and distinctive soralia that produce vegetative propagules. They vary in colour from pale green to yellow-green, grey-green, reddish, or variegated, and range in size from a few millimetres in polluted areas to over three metres long in species like Usnea longissima.

Members of the genus are similar to those of the genus Alectoria. A distinguishing test is that the branches of Usnea are somewhat elastic, but the branches of Alectoria snap cleanly off. Usnea species are widely distributed across temperate and tropical regions worldwide, growing primarily on trees but occasionally on rocks, and are sensitive bioindicators of air quality, thriving only in unpolluted environments. The genus has a complex taxonomic history, with many species historically over-described due to environmental variations, though modern approaches using chemical, morphological, and molecular analyses have helped clarify relationships. Usnea lichens have been used traditionally for medicinal purposes, textile dyes, fire starters, and occasionally as emergency food, and serve important ecological roles including providing nesting material for birds.

== Systematics ==
=== Historical taxonomy ===
The genus Usnea was circumscribed by Michel Adanson in 1763. He used the name designated by Johann Jacob Dillenius, whose earlier published description did not meet the rules of valid publication as established by the International Code of Nomenclature for algae, fungi, and plants. Adanson did not specify a type specimen; the species Usnea florida, moved to the genus by Friedrich Heinrich Wiggers in 1780, has been designated as the lectotype.

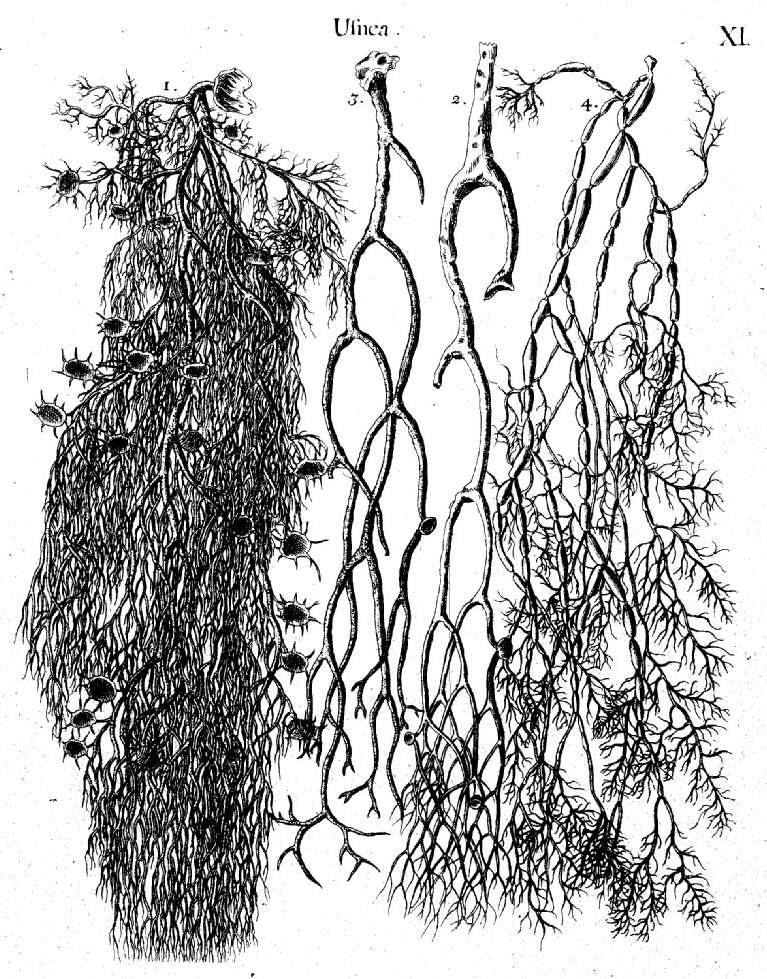
Usnea, as depicted in Dillenius's 1768 work Historia muscorum

Since the establishment of the genus, hundreds of Usnea species have been described. A three-volume series by Józef Motyka published between 1936 and 1947 listed 451 species. However, Motyka applied a strongly typological species concept, treating each minor morphological variant as a distinct species and resulting in an inflated taxonomy. Modern lichenologists recognize that Motyka's approach, which relied heavily on characteristics strongly influenced by environmental conditions (such as thallus color, branch thickness, presence of foveoles, and thallus length), has led to extensive synonymy and confusion within the genus. By 1998, more than 770 names had been published globally, and it was estimated that approximately half were synonyms.

Modern taxonomic treatments of Usnea emphasize a populational species concept, focusing on the variability within populations rather than fixed morphological ideals. This approach recognizes species based on correlated discontinuities in two or more independent characters, including chemistry, anatomy, and morphology, along with an absence or rarity of intermediate forms. Morphological characters such as the glossiness of the cortex, the pigmentation of the basal portion, the presence and morphology of soralia, isidiomorphs (structures resembling isidia but originating from medullary hyphae), and the form and arrangement of fibrils have proven particularly useful.

Chemical analysis, particularly through thin-layer chromatography, has become essential for accurately distinguishing species, as many morphological traits are influenced significantly by environmental factors. Philippe Clerc, a Swiss lichenologist who has specialized in studying Usnea, has cautioned against the recognition of species based solely on chemical differences ("chemotypes") unless strongly correlated morphological or anatomical differences are also present.

By the late 1990s, modern interpretations based on the populational concept, extensive field and herbarium studies, and routine chemical analyses were contributing to a substantial reduction in the total number of recognized species, as previously named taxa were increasingly recognized as synonyms or environmentally induced variations of fewer, more broadly defined species. Clerc estimated at the time that around half of the more than 770 published names would eventually be reduced to synonymy, while also noting that the genus remained incompletely known, especially in tropical regions. Historically, the inflated number of species resulted partly from Motyka's limited opportunities for extensive field studies outside Europe and his reliance on typological rather than populational concepts. Motyka's limited access to advanced chemical analytical tools and his emphasis on characters easily observable with limited optical equipment also contributed to the historical complexity and confusion in Usnea taxonomy.

=== Molecular phylogenetics ===
Molecular studies have highlighted the importance of accurate species identification in the genus Usnea, demonstrating that incorrect identifications can significantly distort phylogenetic analyses. For instance, careful morphological and anatomical re-examinations of voucher specimens previously used in molecular studies revealed that supposed synonymies, such as those between U. barbata and U. dasopoga, were incorrect. Instead, these species are distinct and separable by anatomical measurements and chemistry, underscoring the necessity of integrating careful morphological analysis with molecular techniques in systematic studies. Recent molecular barcoding studies of Usnea have shown mixed results. While internal transcribed spacer (ITS) barcoding provides reliable identification for some species, it fails to fully resolve complex aggregate taxa, such as the U. cornuta complex. Identification through simple BLAST searches of public databases can be problematic due to misidentifications in published sequences. Evidence suggests some species groups within Usnea are undergoing rapid evolution, with traditional species circumscriptions sometimes containing multiple distinct genetic clades or being intermixed within individual clades. This evolutionary complexity creates additional challenges for taxonomists working to establish stable species boundaries within the genus.

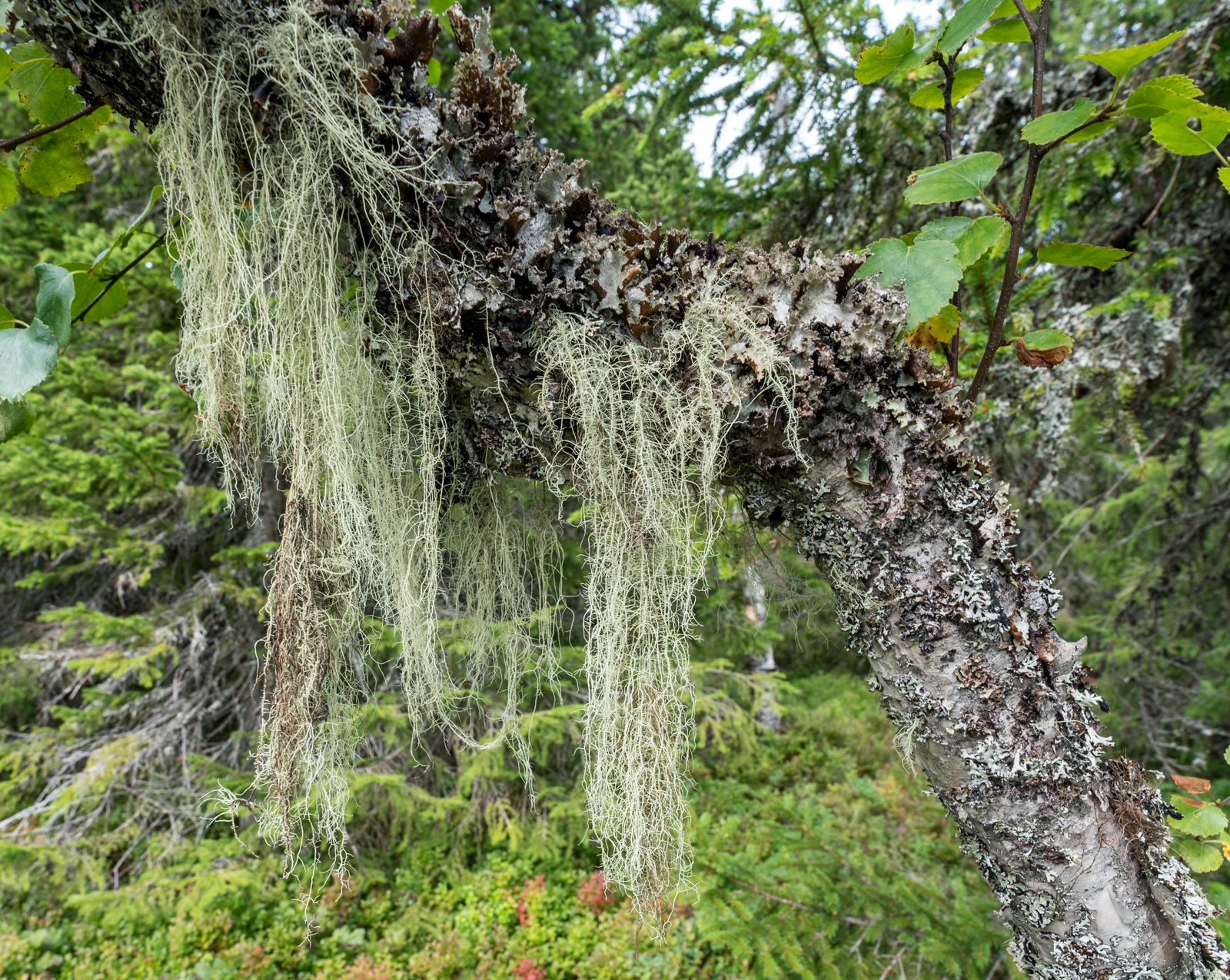
Usnea dasopoga

A group within Usnea, historically treated as the subgenus or genus Eumitria, includes species characterized by having a tubular central axis throughout the entire thallus; these are referred to as "eumitrioid" species. Although once proposed as a separate genus based on morphological and phylogenetic distinctions, the taxonomic placement of Eumitria remains debated due to unresolved phylogenetic relationships and overlapping morphological characteristics. The term "eumitrioid" continues to be used informally until clear phylogenetic evidence supports formal recognition.

In cold-region (polar and high-alpine) members of Usnea in the neuropogonoid group, species boundaries have been difficult to resolve from morphology alone. Genome-scale DNA data help separate look-alike species in this group. A phylogenomic analysis using reference-based RADSeq DNA data from 126 specimens and more than 20,000 loci (genetic markers) found evidence that the neuropogonoid group forms a single evolutionary lineage (monophyletic). It also clarified several debated species boundaries, describing two species (U. aymondiana and U. fibriloides) and reinstated three names that had previously been treated as synonyms. Divergence-time estimates (from a molecular clock amalysis) suggest that most lineages split near the Pliocene–Pleistocene boundary (about 3 million years ago) and in the early Pleistocene (about 1.5 million years ago), while the oldest splits date to the late Miocene.

The mitochondrial genomes of several Usnea species have been studied, revealing high variability in genome size and structure among species, with considerable differences in the amount and type of non-coding (intronic) sequences. All five species investigated (U. halei, U. mutabilis, U. subfusca, U. subgracilis, and U. subscabrosa) lacked the mitochondrial gene atp9, which is involved in energy production, suggesting that these lichens have evolved an obligate dependency on their algal partners for essential energy-related functions.

=== Naming ===
The name Usnea is probably derived from the Arabic word Ushnah, meaning moss or lichen, though it may also mean "rope-like". Based on fossilized Usnea found in Baltic amber, the genus dates back to at least the late Eocene, about 34 million years ago.

== Description ==
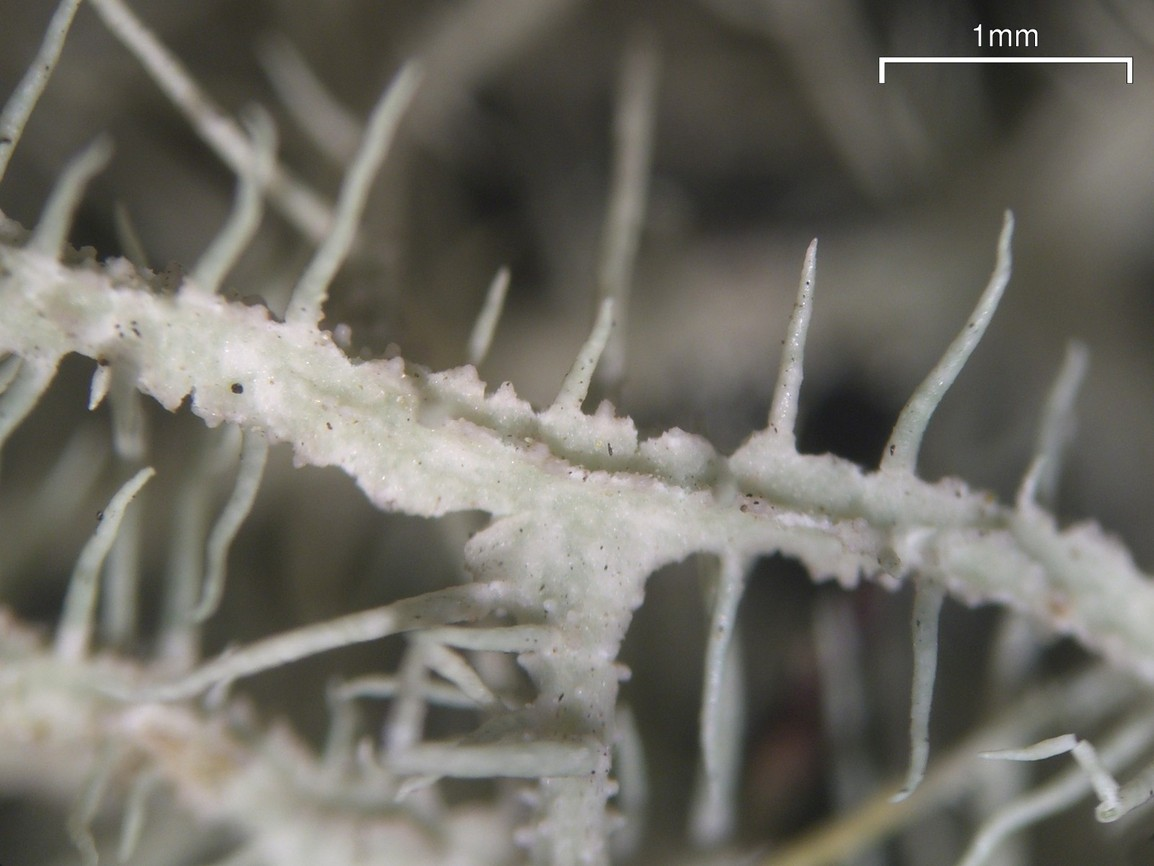
Usnea angulata has ridged branches.

Usnea lichens are fruticose. Structurally they are shrubby, often with many branches, and can be erect or pendent. Some trailing species can grow to considerable size; strands of Usnea longissima, for example, may exceed 3 meters (9.8 ft) in length. Colours vary depending on the species, from straw-coloured, yellow-green or pale green through green or greyish-green to reddish or variegated red and green. Unlike other similar-looking fruticose lichens, species in this genus have an elastic chord or axis running through the middle of the thallus that can be revealed by gently pulling a filament apart from either end.

Some Usnea species have distinctive soralia, which are structures that produce vegetative propagules and serve as an important taxonomic character for species identification. Soralia in Usnea vary in morphology, being characterized by their surface (raised, depressed, or excavate), size, shape (regular or irregular), margin definition, density on branches, and the presence or absence of isidia, with these features being genetically determined and correlating with distinct chemical and geographic properties of different species. Few Usnea species produce true isidia (small vegetative outgrowths covered entirely by cortex), with U. hirta being one example. Many species instead develop fragile isidium-like structures that often erode into soralia. The soredia produced from these structures can become partly corticated, rounded, or finger-like, and are termed isidiomorphs. Species that are entirely sorediate (such as U. glabrata, U. fulvoreagens, and U. esperantiana) never produce isidiomorphs and are distinctive for this reason. The characteristics of soralia—their outline when viewed from above, their profile from the side, their size relative to branches, their distribution, and the presence or absence of isidiomorphs—are critical features for distinguishing between morphologically similar species.

Holdfast coloration can be diagnostically useful, with certain species including U. flavocardia, U. fragilescens, U. subfloridana, U. silesiaca and U. wasmuthii showing blackening at the holdfast, while in other shrubby species the holdfast remains pale. Young Usnea thalli are rarely identifiable using morphological characteristics alone, often requiring chemical spot tests on the medulla (ideally supported by thin-layer chromatography) for accurate identification.

Usnea can be distinguished from similar-looking fruticose lichen genera such as Evernia and Ramalina by several key features. While these other genera also grow as gray-green or yellow-green tufts on trees, they typically have flatter, less extensively branched thalli and lack the distinctive elastic, cartilaginous central axis that characterizes Usnea.

Usnea looks very similar to the plant Spanish moss, so much so that the latter's Latin name is derived from it (Tillandsia usneoides, the 'Usnea-like Tillandsia').

== Distribution and habitat ==
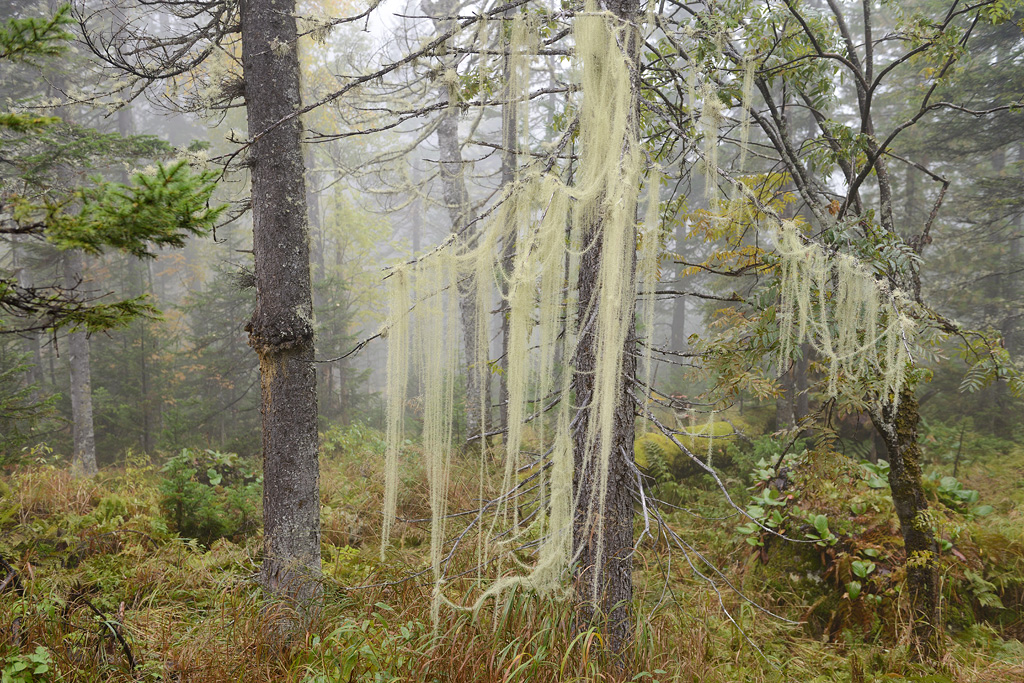
Long, pendulous Usnea lichens in the Baikal Nature Reserve, Russia

Usnea lichens are widely distributed in both the northern and southern hemisphere, in both temperate and tropical regions. They show significant diversity, particularly in tropical and subtropical regions, and occupy a variety of habitats, from humid forests to arid and alpine environments. In South America, the diversity of Usnea species is particularly high, with many species adapted to specialized habitats. Studies in southern Brazil identified 17 corticolous (tree-inhabiting), shrubby species lacking vegetative propagules, some of which were previously unknown. In the tropical Andes and Galápagos Islands, eumitrioid Usnea species, characterized by a tubular central axis, include both widespread species such as U. baileyi and species endemic to specific mountainous areas. Additionally, species with distinctive red-orange pigmentation, such as U. crocata and U. rubricornuta, have a distribution that integrates elements from North America, Africa, and Asia, emphasizing the cosmopolitan nature of this genus. In Asia, Usnea diversity has also been well documented, with studies identifying multiple species across various climatic zones. In South Korea, detailed taxonomic work has recorded several species, including new records such as U. hakonensis. In southern Far East Russia, nineteen species have been confirmed, with some species newly reported for Russia.

In the Philippines, Usnea is abundant in mountainous regions, yet remains understudied. A detailed review documented at least 81 species across the archipelago, including taxa of pharmaceutical and agricultural interest, and noted regions requiring further exploration. Further integrative research combining morphological and molecular approaches in the southern Philippines has confirmed an additional 20 taxa, including newly described species and new records for the country, illustrating ongoing discovery and taxonomic refinement.

In Europe, Usnea is common in temperate and boreal forests. Estonia, for example, hosts species that predominantly colonize spruce (Picea), but also occasionally grow on deciduous trees and even rocks. Similarly, in Belarus, the genus comprises at least 15 species, with U. hirta, U. dasopoga, and U. subfloridana being the most common.

Usnea is also diverse on islands. A 2018 study conducted in the Galápagos Islands recognized 27 species, with a relatively high proportion of endemic species. In tropical West Africa, on the islands of São Tomé and Príncipe, 15 species have been identified, including new species such as U. beckeri and U. longiciliata.

Usnea lichens appear in areas with low levels of air pollution. They can often be found on the ground in areas with where trees or branches have recently been cut, such as orchards (after pruning) and active logging areas.

== Ecology ==
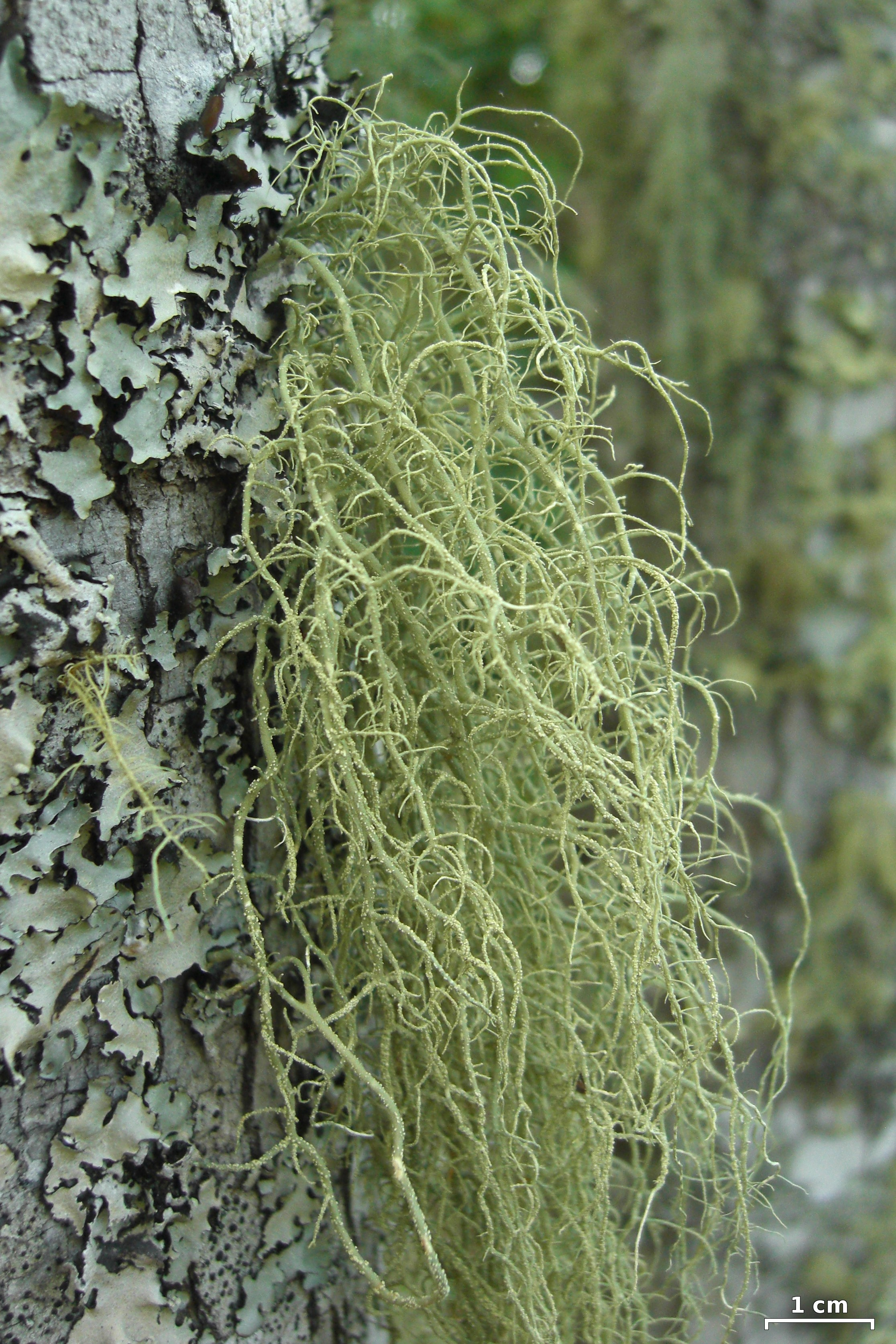
Usnea ceratina

Usnea lichens reproduce via vegetative means through fragmentation, asexual means through soredia, or sexual means through ascogonium and spermatogonium. The growth rate of lichens in nature is slow, but can be increased in laboratory conditions.

Like other lichens, Usnea often grows on sick or dying trees due to the pre-existing loss of canopy leaves, allowing for greater photosynthesis by the lichen's algae; this leads some gardeners to mistakenly blame the lichen for the tree's leaf loss and illness.

A study in Maritime Antarctica found that Usnea communities are predominantly distributed on wind-exposed convex terrain, making their presence an effective proxy for identifying areas with minimal snow cover during winter. High-resolution remote sensing imagery can accurately map these communities, offering insights for modeling permafrost distribution and ecological processes influenced by snow cover.

Usnea is very sensitive to air pollution, especially sulfur dioxide. This sensitivity has made air pollution-sensitive species such as Usnea hirta useful as air-quality bioindicators.

== Uses ==
=== By humans ===
==== Traditional medicines ====
According to Paul Bergner, Author of Medical Herbalism, "the usnic acid in Usnea is effective against gram-positive bacteria such as Streptococcus and Staphylococcus, making Usnea a valuable addition to herbal formulas for sore throats and skin infections. It is also effective against a bacterium that commonly causes pneumonia."

Bolivian traditional healers called the Kallawaya use Kaka sunka in decoction to cure lung problems. The lichen is macerated in alcohol and rubbed onto the body of those suffering from "nervous fragility".

Some believe that Usnea, in high concentrations, could possess some toxicity. The National Toxicology Program evaluated the issue, undertaking research involved feeding male and female rats and mice ground Usnea lichens containing usnic acid for three months at various concentrations. Rats suffered severe toxicity, with significant liver damage observed at various concentrations, while mice experienced liver toxicity, ovarian atrophy, and changes in reproductive cycles at higher doses. Additionally, both species showed weight loss at elevated exposure levels, and mice exhibited potential genetic damage after two weeks at high concentrations. A safe exposure level was established at 60 parts per million, below which no adverse effects were observed.

==== Dyes ====
Usnea species have been used to create yellow, orange, green, blue, and purple dyes for textiles. This wide variety of possible colors can be achieved due to variations in chemical composition depending on the species, locality, and race of a particular specimen. Specifically, Usnea can contain thamnolic, squamatic, barbatic, salazinic, and alectorialic acids, all of which can affect dye color.

Many indigenous peoples of Central and South America, including the Tarahumura and Mapuche people, have a history of dyeing with Usnea, generally to obtain orange and brown hues. The Tarahumura use them to dye wool blankets in brown and russet hues, and the Mapuche have used Usnea florida to obtain orange. There is also anthropological evidence that Usnea cocca sonca was historically used for dyeing in Peru, and a lichen called cuaxapaxtle was used near Mexico City.

==== Cosmetics ====
Usnea barbata has been used in cosmetic production for its antimicrobial and antifungal properties as a preservative and deodorant.

==== Firestarters ====
When dry, Usnea lichens are flammable and can be used as a fire starter.

==== Food ====
Some Usnea species have been used as food sources during times of scarcity. For example, people in Bosnia and Herzegovina ate Usnea barbata during the Bosnian War, particularly in the winter, when other plant material was not readily available. They ground it into powdery "flour" to make bread or ate it as mush.

=== By other organisms ===
The northern parula, a species of New World warbler which breeds in North America, uses Usnea lichens in the construction of its nest in some parts of its range. Where these lichens have declined due to air pollution, the bird has also vanished as a breeding species.
