= Friedrich Heinrich Wiggers =

German botanist (1746–1811)

- Born: 15 March 1746
- Died: 3 March 1811 (aged 64)
- Education: University of Kiel
- Children: 4
- Scientific career
- Fields: Botany
- Author abbrev. (botany): F.H.Wigg.

Friedrich Heinrich Wiggers (15 March 1746 – 3 March 1811) was a German botanist who wrote a flora of Holstein in 1780. A number of variants of his name exist, including "Fridrich Hindrich" and the Latinisation "Fredericus Henricus" and the alternative surname "Wichers".

Wiggers enrolled at the University of Kiel in 1774, and published his dissertation, "Primitiae Florae Holsaticae", in 1780. He received his doctorate four years later in 1784, becoming a doctor of medicine. He settled down in Apenrade in Schleswig, where he married in 1785 and became the father of four children.

The standard author abbreviation F.H.Wigg. is used to indicate Wiggers as the author when citing a botanical name.
