= Wildlife of Antarctica =

Antarctic wildlife

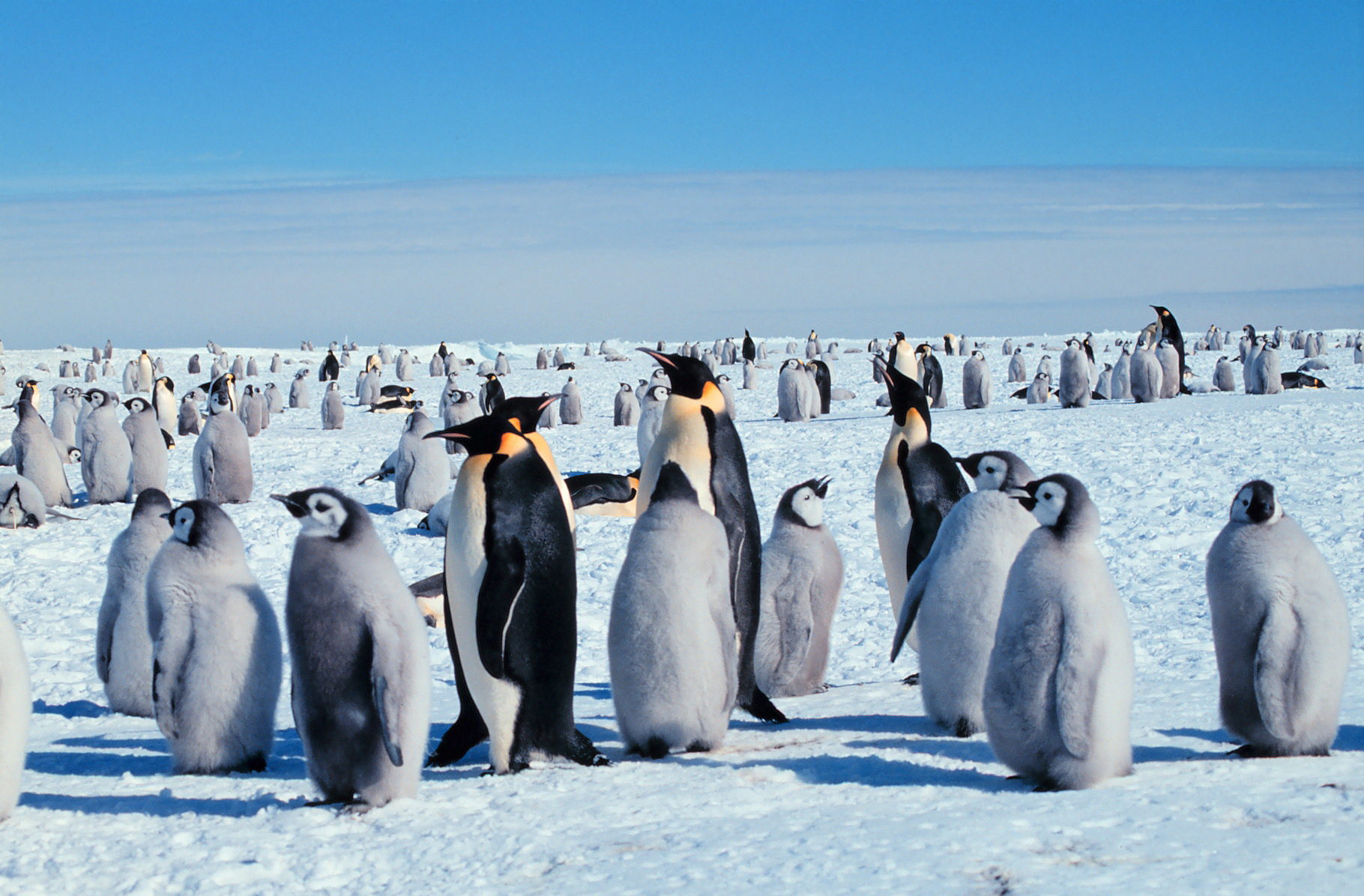
Emperor penguins (Aptenodytes forsteri) are the only animals to breed on mainland Antarctica during the winter.

The wildlife of Antarctica are extremophiles, having adapted to the dryness, low temperatures, and high exposure common in Antarctica. The extreme weather of the interior contrasts to the relatively mild conditions on the Antarctic Peninsula and the subantarctic islands, which have warmer temperatures and more liquid water. Much of the ocean around the mainland is covered by sea ice. The oceans themselves are a more stable environment for life, both in the water column and on the seabed.

There is relatively little diversity in Antarctica compared to much of the rest of the world. Terrestrial life is concentrated in areas near the coast. Flying birds nest on the milder shores of the Peninsula and the subantarctic islands. Eight species of penguins inhabit Antarctica and its offshore islands. They share these areas with seven pinniped species. The Southern Ocean around Antarctica is home to 10 cetaceans, many of them migratory. There are very few terrestrial invertebrates on the mainland, although the species that do live there have high population densities. High densities of invertebrates also live in the ocean, with Antarctic krill forming dense and widespread swarms during the summer. Benthic animal communities also exist around the continent.

Over 1,000 fungi species have been found on and around Antarctica. Larger species are restricted to the subantarctic islands, and the majority of species discovered have been terrestrial. Plants are similarly restricted mostly to the subantarctic islands, and the western edge of the Peninsula. Some mosses and lichens however can be found even in the dry interior. Many algae are found around Antarctica, especially phytoplankton, which form the basis of many of Antarctica's food webs.

Human activity has caused introduced species to gain a foothold in the area, threatening the native wildlife. A history of overfishing and hunting has left many species with greatly reduced numbers. Pollution, habitat destruction, and climate change pose great risks to the environment. The Antarctic Treaty System is a global treaty designed to preserve Antarctica as a place of research, and measures from this system are used to regulate human activity in Antarctica.

== Environmental conditions ==
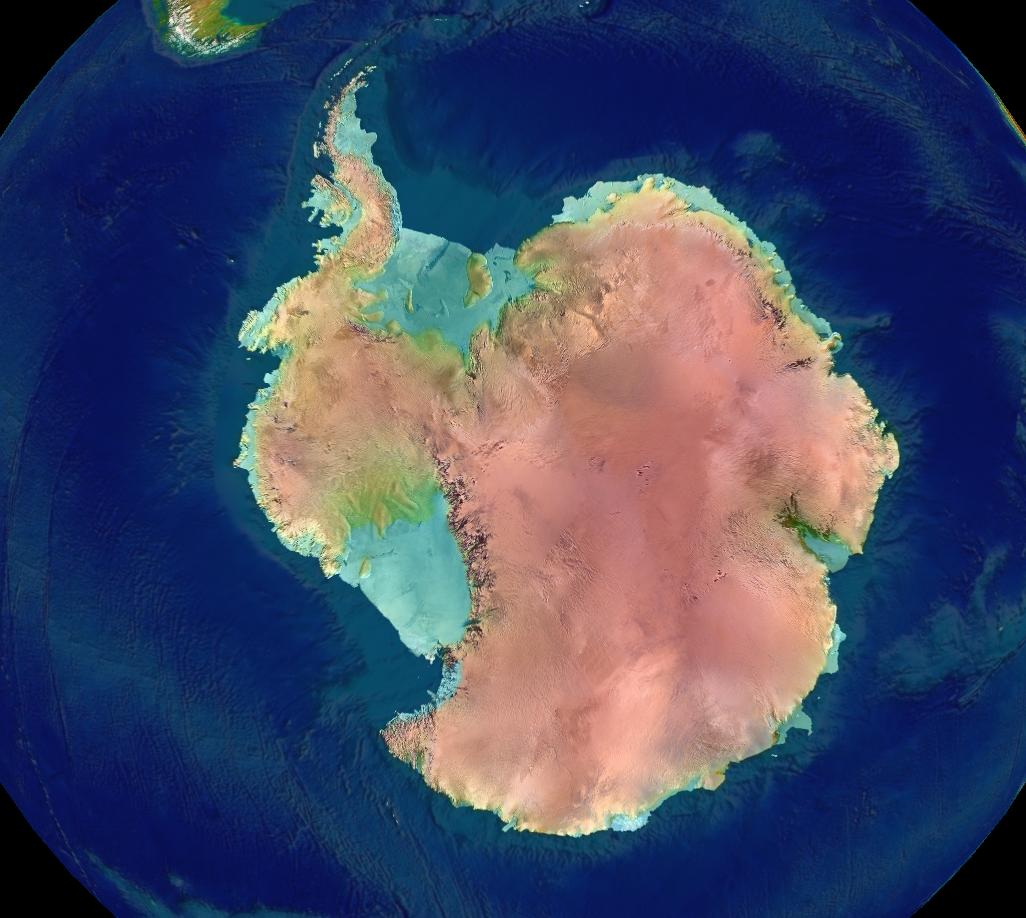
Elevation of the Antarctic terrain

Around 98% of continental Antarctica is covered in ice up to 4.7 kilometres (2.9 mi) thick. Antarctica's icy deserts have extremely low temperatures, high solar radiation, and extreme dryness. Any precipitation that does fall usually falls as snow, and is restricted to a band around 300 kilometres (186 mi) from the coast. Some areas receive as little as 50 mm (2.0 in) of precipitation annually. The coldest temperature recorded on Earth was −89.4 °C (−128.9 °F) at Vostok Station on the Antarctic Plateau. Organisms that survive in Antarctica are often extremophiles.

The dry interior of the continent is climatically different from the western Antarctic Peninsula and the subantarctic islands. The Peninsula and the islands are far more habitable; some areas of the peninsula can receive 900 mm (35.4 in) of precipitation a year, including rain, and the northern Peninsula is the only area on the mainland where temperatures are expected to go above 0 °C (32 °F) in summer. The subantarctic islands have a milder temperature and more water, and so are more conducive to life.

The surface temperature of the Southern Ocean varies very little, ranging from 1 °C (33.8 °F) to 1.8 °C (35.2 °F). During the summer sea ice covers 4,000,000 square kilometres (1,500,000 sq mi) of ocean. The continental shelf surrounding the mainland is 60 to 240 kilometres (37 to 149 mi) wide. The depth of the seafloor in this area ranges from 50 to 800 metres (164 to 2,625 ft), with an average of 500 metres (1,640 ft). After the shelf, the continental slope descends to abyssal plains, 3,500–5,000 metres (11,483–16,404 ft) deep. In all these areas, 90% of the seafloor is made up of soft sediments, such as sand, mud, and gravel.

Ozone depletion and the presence of a seasonal ozone hole above Antarctica exposes the area to high levels of ultraviolet radiation, although the hole is usually largest when snow and ice is more widespread, reducing overall impact.

== Animals ==
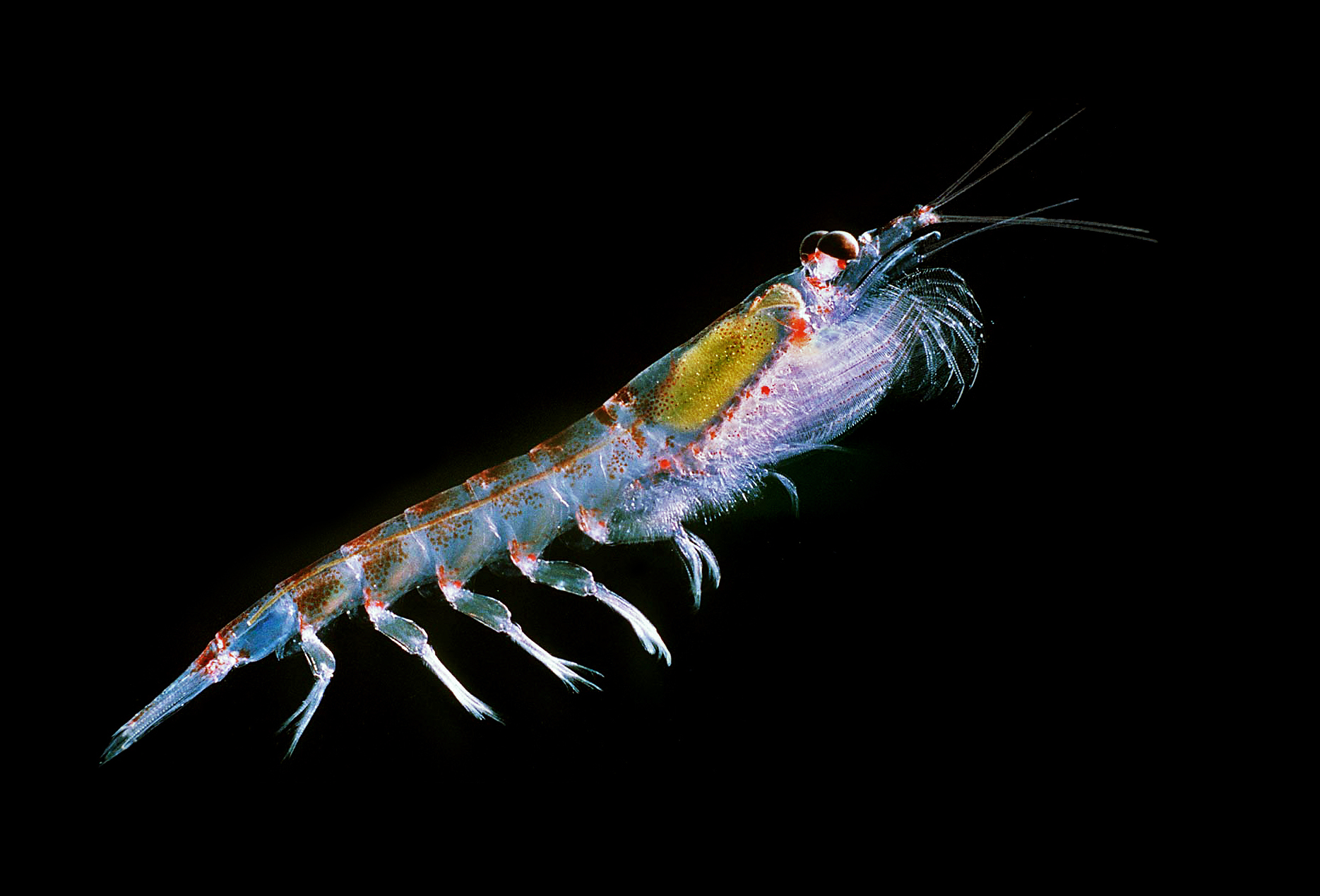
Antarctic krill (Euphausia superba) are a keystone species, forming an important part of the Antarctic food web.

At least 235 marine species are found in both Antarctica and the Arctic, ranging in size from whales and birds to small marine snails, sea cucumbers, and mud-dwelling worms. The large animals often migrate between the two, and smaller animals are expected to be able to spread via underwater currents. However, among smaller marine animals generally assumed to be the same in the Antarctica and the Arctic, more detailed studies of each population have often—but not always—revealed differences, showing that they are closely related cryptic species rather than a single bipolar species. Antarctic animals have adapted to reduce heat loss, with mammals developing warm windproof coats and layers of blubber.

Antarctica's cold deserts have some of the least diverse fauna in the world. Terrestrial vertebrates are limited to subantarctic islands, and even then they are limited in number. Antarctica, including the subantarctic islands, has no natural fully terrestrial mammals, reptiles, or amphibians. Human activity has however led to the introduction in some areas of foreign species, such as rats, mice, chickens, rabbits, cats, pigs, sheep, cattle, reindeer, and various fish. Invertebrates, such as beetle species, have also been introduced.

The benthic communities of the seafloor are diverse and dense, with up to 155,000 animals found in 1 square metre (10.8 sq ft). As the seafloor environment is very similar all around the Antarctic, hundreds of species can be found all the way around the mainland, which is a uniquely wide distribution for such a large community. Polar and deep-sea gigantism, where invertebrates are considerably larger than their warmer-water relatives, is common in this habitat. These two similar types of gigantism are believed to be related to the cold water, which can contain high levels of oxygen, combined with the low metabolic rates ("slow life") of animals living in such cold environments.

=== Birds ===
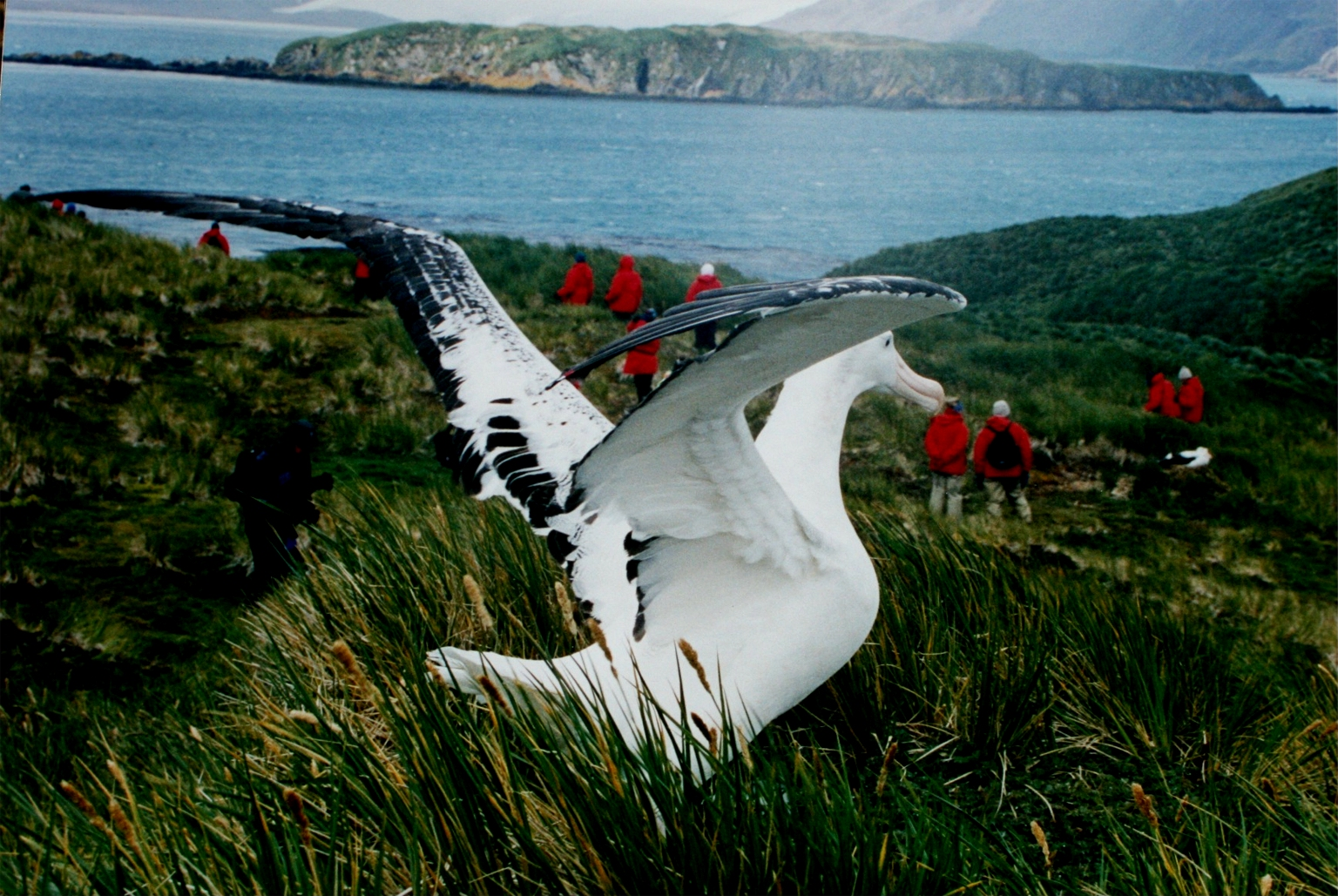
A wandering albatross (Diomedea exulans) on South Georgia

The rocky shores of mainland Antarctica and its offshore islands provide nesting space for over 100 million birds every spring. These nesters include species of albatrosses, petrels, skuas, gulls and terns. The insectivorous South Georgia pipit is endemic to South Georgia and some smaller surrounding islands. Ducks, the South Georgia pintail and Eaton's pintail, inhabit South Georgia, Kerguelen and Crozet.

The flightless penguins are almost all located in the Southern Hemisphere (the only exception is the equatorial Galapagos penguin), with the greatest concentration located on and around Antarctica. Four of the eighteen penguin species live and breed on the mainland and its close offshore islands. Another four species live on the subantarctic islands. Emperor penguins have four overlapping layers of feathers, keeping them warm. They also reduce heat loss with countercurrent heat exchange systems throughout their body to cool blood as it reaches extremities like the feet. They are the only Antarctic animal to breed during the winter.

=== Fish ===
Compared to other major oceans, there are few fish species in few families in the Southern Ocean. The most species-rich family are the snailfish (Liparidae), followed by the cod icefish (Nototheniidae) and eelpouts (Zoarcidae). Together the snailfish, eelpouts and notothenioids (which includes cod icefish and several other families) account for almost 9/10 of the more than 320 described fish species in the Southern Ocean. Tens of undescribed species also occur in the region, especially among the snailfish. If strictly counting fish species of the Antarctic continental shelf and upper slope, there are more than 220 species and notothenioids dominate, both in number of species (more than 100) and biomass (more than 90%). Southern Ocean snailfish and eelpouts are generally found in deep waters, while the icefish also are common in shallower waters. In addition to the relatively species-rich families, the region is home to a few species from other families: hagfish (Myxinidae), lamprey (Petromyzontidae), skates (Rajidae), pearlfish (Carapidae), morid cods (Moridae), eel cods (Muraenolepididae), gadid cods (Gadidae), horsefish (Congiopodidae), Antarctic sculpins (Bathylutichthyidae), triplefins (Tripterygiidae) and southern flounders (Achiropsettidae). Among fish found south of the Antarctic Convergence, almost 90% of the species are endemic to the region.

==== Icefish ====
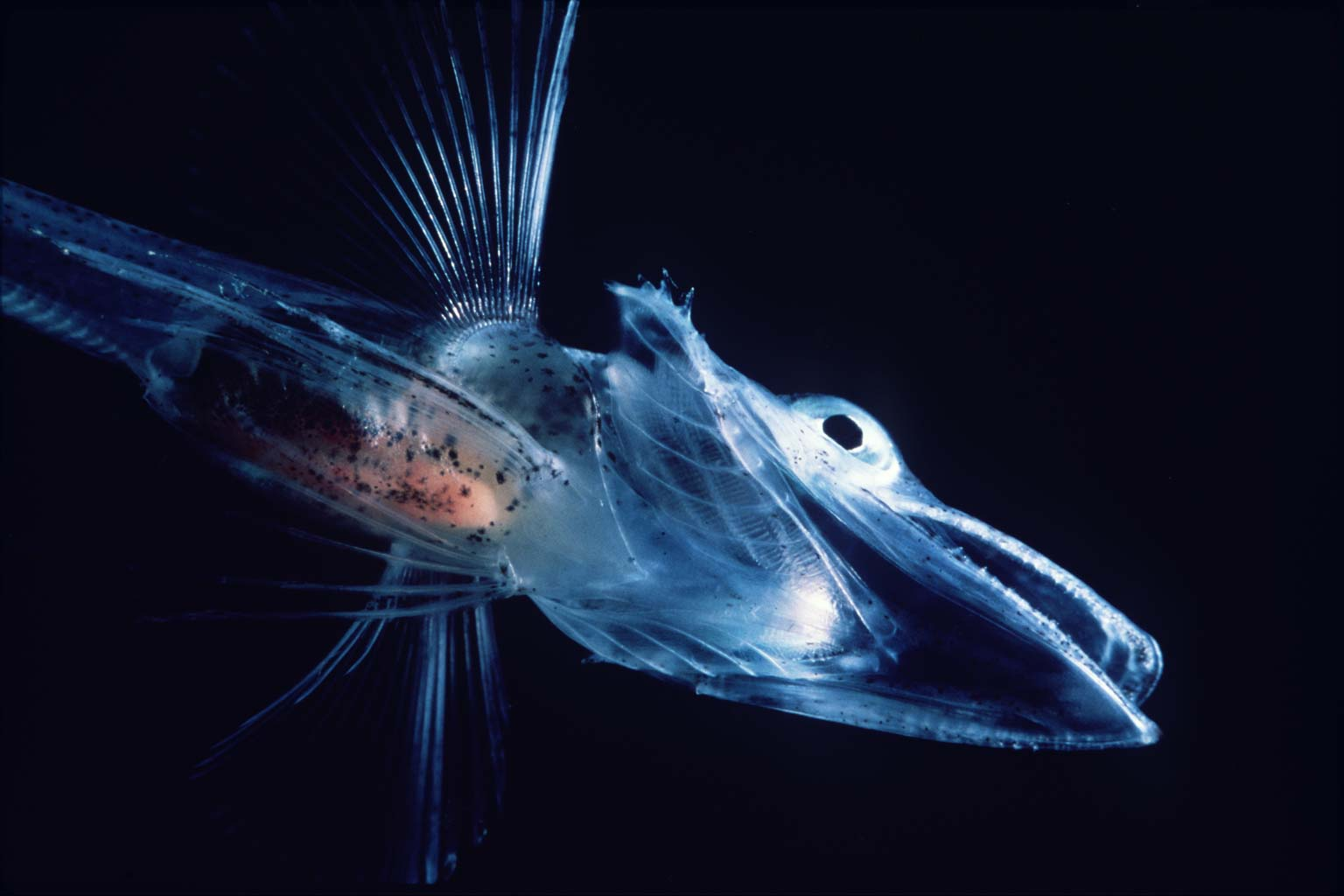
Fish of the Notothenioidei suborder, such as this young icefish, are mostly restricted to the Antarctic and subantarctic

Cod icefish (Nototheniidae), as well as several other families, are part of the Notothenioidei suborder, collectively sometimes referred to as icefish. The suborder contains many species with antifreeze proteins in their blood and tissue, allowing them to live in water that is around or slightly below 0 °C (32 °F). Antifreeze proteins are also known from Southern Ocean snailfish and eelpouts.

There are two icefish species from the genus Dissostichus, the Antarctic toothfish (D. mawsoni) and the Patagonian toothfish (D. eleginoides), which by far are the largest fish in the Southern Ocean. These two species live on the seafloor from relatively shallow water to depths of 3,000 m (9,800 ft), and can grow to around 2 m (6.6 ft) long weighing up to 100 kg (220 lb), living up to 45 years. The Antarctic toothfish lives close to the Antarctic mainland, whereas the Patagonian toothfish lives in the relatively warmer subantarctic waters. Toothfish are commercially fished, and illegal overfishing has reduced toothfish populations.

Another abundant icefish group is the genus Notothenia, which like the Antarctic toothfish have antifreeze in their bodies.

An unusual species of icefish is the Antarctic silverfish (Pleuragramma antarcticum), which is the only truly pelagic fish in the waters near Antarctica.

=== Mammals ===
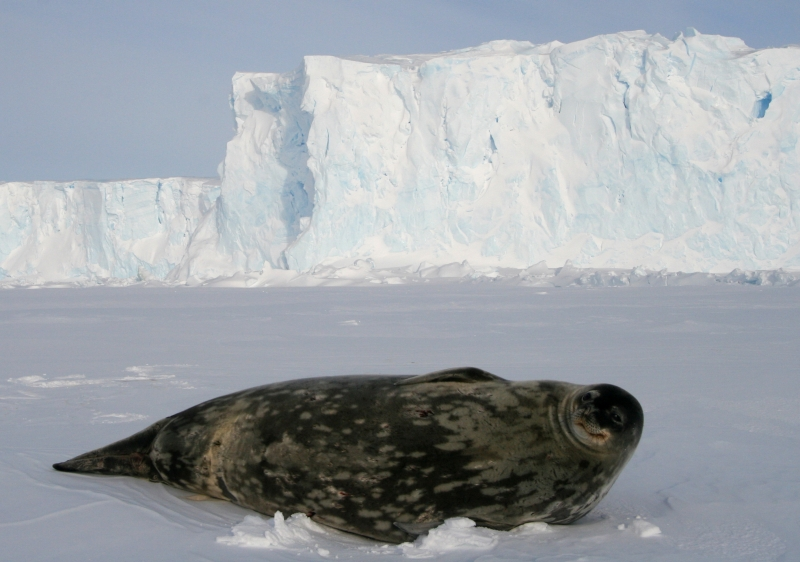
Weddell seals (Leptonychotes weddellii) are the most southerly of Antarctic mammals.

Six pinniped species inhabit Antarctica. The largest, the Southern elephant seal (Mirounga leonina), can reach up to 4,000 kilograms (8,818 lb) and over 6 metres (20 ft) long, while females of the smallest, the Antarctic fur seal (Arctophoca gazella), reach only 150 kilograms (331 lb). These two species live north of the sea ice, and breed in harems on beaches. The other four species can live on the sea ice. Crabeater seals (Lobodon carcinophagus) and Weddell seals (Leptonychotes weddellii) form breeding colonies, whereas leopard seals (Hydrurga leptonyx) and Ross seals (Ommatophoca rossii) live solitary lives. Although these species hunt underwater, they breed on land or ice and spend a great deal of time there, as they have no terrestrial predators.

The four species that inhabit sea ice are thought to make up 50% of the total biomass of the world's seals. Crabeater seals have a population of around 15 million, making them one of the most numerous large animals on the planet. The New Zealand sea lion (Phocarctos hookeri), one of the rarest and most localized pinnipeds, breeds almost exclusively on the subantarctic Auckland Islands, although historically it had a wider range. Out of all permanent mammalian residents, the Weddell seals live the furthest south.

There are 10 cetacean species found in the Southern Ocean; six baleen whales, and four toothed whales. The largest of these, the blue whale (Balaenoptera musculus), grows to 24 metres (79 ft) long weighing 84 tonnes. Many of these species are migratory, and travel to tropical waters during the Antarctic winter. Orcas, which do not migrate, nonetheless regularly travel to warmer waters, possibly to relieve the stress the temperature has on their skin.

=== Land invertebrates ===
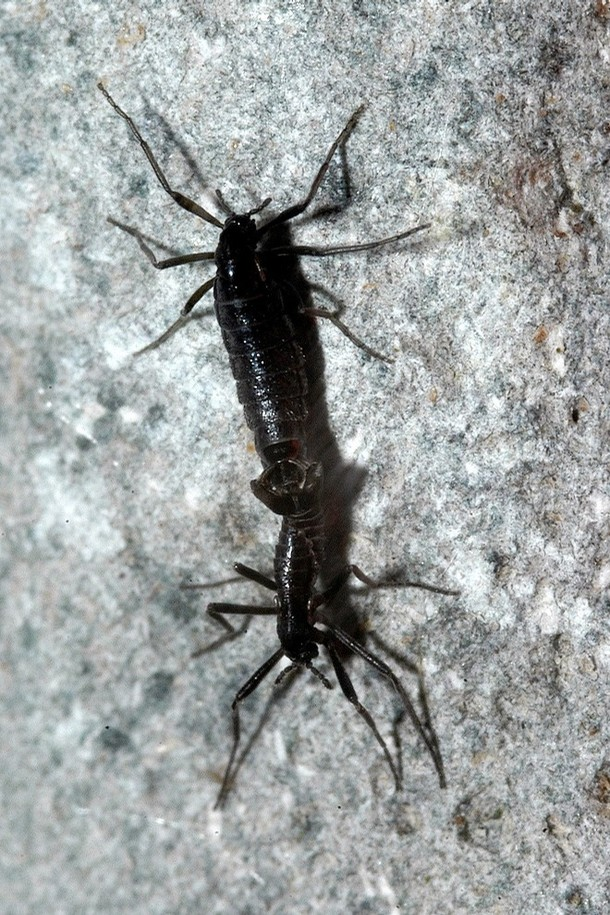
A pair of Belgica antarctica, the only insect on mainland Antarctica.

Most terrestrial invertebrates are restricted to the subantarctic islands. Although there are very few species, those that do inhabit Antarctica have high population densities. In the more extreme areas of the mainland, such as the cold deserts, food webs are sometimes restricted to three nematode species, only one of which is a predator. Many invertebrates on the subantarctic islands can live in subzero temperatures without freezing, whereas those on the mainland can survive being frozen.

Mites and springtails make up most terrestrial arthropod species, although various spiders, beetles, and flies can be found. Several thousand individuals from various mite and springtail species can be found in 1 square metre (10.8 sq ft). Beetles and flies are the most species rich insect groups on the islands. Insects play an important role in recycling dead plant material.

The mainland of Antarctica has no macro-arthropods. Micro-arthropods are restricted to areas with vegetation and nutrients provided by the presence of vertebrates, and where liquid water can be found. Belgica antarctica, a wingless midge, is the only true insect found on the mainland. With sizes ranging from 2–6 mm (0.08–0.24 in), it is the mainland's largest terrestrial animal.

There are also several lakes where various species of planktonic crustaceans live.

On the sub-Antarctic and maritime-Antarctic islands, terrestrial animals like earthworms and molluscs, along with micro-invertebrates, such as nematodes, tardigrades, and rotifers, are also found. Earthworms and insects, are important decomposers.

The springtail Gomphiocephalus hodgsoni is endemic and restricted to southern Victoria Land between Mt. George Murray (75°55′S) and Minna Bluff (78°28′S) and to the adjacent nearshore islands. Insects endemic to Antarctica include:

- Belgica albipes, a midge
- Belgica antarctica, a midge
- Siphlopteryx antarctica, a fly

Springtail species identified in recent research:

- Antarcticinella monoculata
- Cryptopygus antarcticus
- Desoria klovstadi
- Friesea grisea
- Gomphiocephalus hodgsoni
- Gressittacantha terranova
- Cryptopygus nivicolus

Mite species identified in recent research:

- Coccorhagidia keithi
- Nanorchestes antarcticus
- Stereotydeus mollis
- Tydeus setsukoae

=== Marine invertebrates ===
==== Arthropods ====
Five species of krill, small free-swimming crustaceans, are found in the Southern Ocean. The Antarctic krill (Euphausia superba) is one of the most abundant animal species on earth, with a biomass of around 500 million tonnes. Each individual is 6 centimetres (2.4 in) long and weighs over 1 gram (0.035 oz). The swarms that form can stretch for kilometres, with up to 30,000 individuals per 1 cubic metre (35 ft^{3}), turning the water red. Swarms usually remain in deep water during the day, ascending during the night to feed on plankton. Many larger animals depend on krill for their own survival. During the winter when food is scarce, adult Antarctic krill can revert to a smaller juvenile stage, using their own body as nutrition.

Many benthic crustaceans have a non-seasonal breeding cycle, and some raise their eggs and young in a brood pouch (they lack a pelagic larvae stage). Glyptonotus antarcticus at up to 20 cm (8 in) in length and 70 grams (2.5 oz) in weight, and Ceratoserolis trilobitoides at up to 8 cm (3.1 in) in length are unusually large benthic isopods and examples of Polar gigantism. Amphipods are abundant in soft sediments, eating a range of items, from algae to other animals. The amphipods are highly diverse with more than 600 recognized species found south of the Antarctic Convergence and there are indications that many undescribed species remain. Among these are several "giants", such as the iconic epimeriids that are up to 8 cm (3.1 in) long.

Crabs have traditionally not been recognized as part of the fauna in the Antarctic region, but studies in the last few decades have found a few species (mostly king crabs) in deep water. This initially led to fears (frequently quoted in the mainstream media) that they were invading from more northern regions because of global warming and possibly could cause serious damage to the native fauna, but more recent studies show they too are native and formerly simply had been overlooked. Nevertheless, many species from these southern oceans are extremely vulnerable to temperature changes, being unable to survive even a small warming of the water. Although a few specimens of the non-native great spider crab (Hyas araneus) were captured at the South Shetland Islands in 1986, there have been no further records from the region.

Slow moving sea spiders are common, sometimes growing up to about 35 cm (1 ft) in leg span (another example of Polar gigantism). Roughly 20% of the sea spider species in the world are from Antarctic waters. They feed on the corals, sponges, and bryozoans that litter the seabed.

==== Mollusks ====
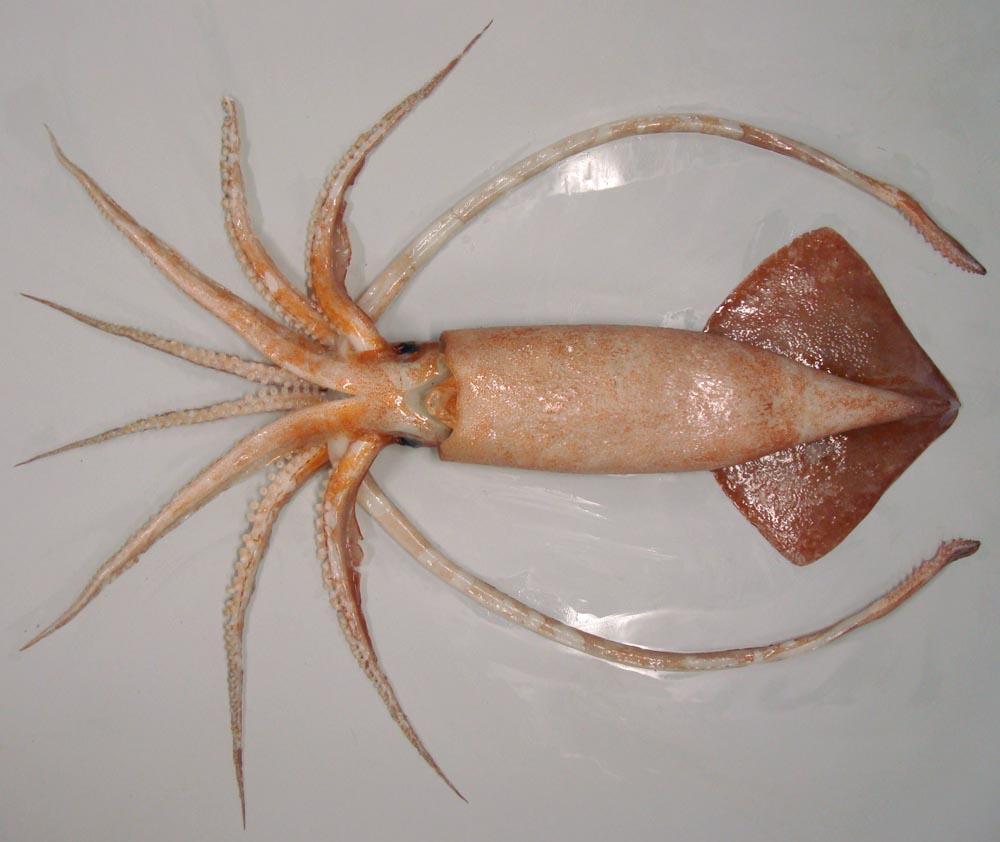
A female warty squid (Moroteuthis ingens)

Many aquatic mollusks are present in Antarctica. Bivalves such as Adamussium colbecki move around on the seafloor, while others such as Laternula elliptica live in burrows filtering the water above. There are around 70 cephalopod species in the Southern Ocean, the largest of which is the colossal squid (Mesonychoteuthis hamiltoni), which at up to 14 metres (46 ft) is among the largest invertebrates in the world. Squid make up most of the diet of some animals, such as gray-headed albatrosses and sperm whales, and the warty squid (Moroteuthis ingens) is one of the subantarctic's most preyed upon species by vertebrates.

==== Other marine invertebrates ====
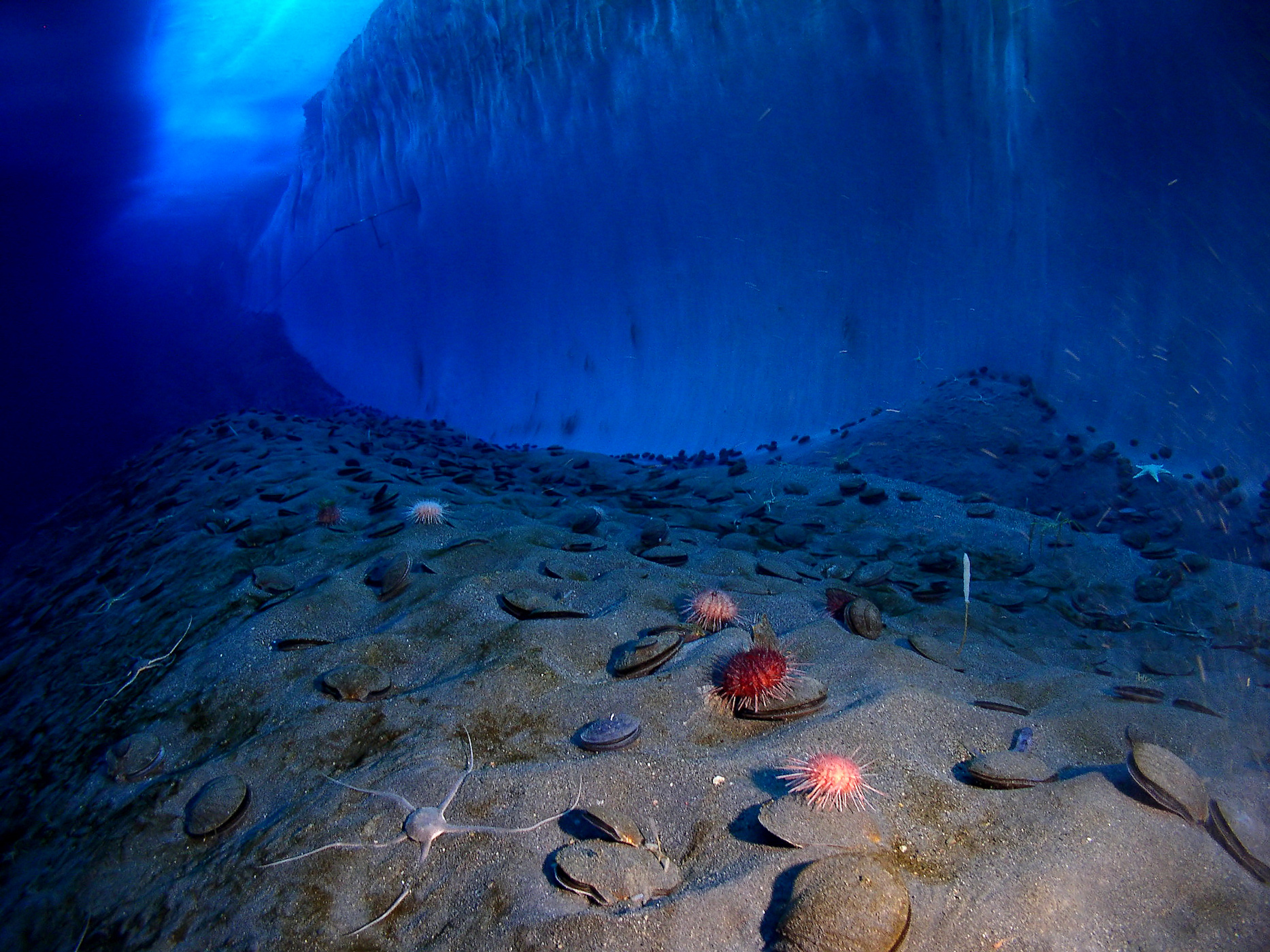
Underwater in McMurdo Sound, including the sea urchin Sterechinus neumayeri, brittle star Ophionotus victoriae, scallop Adamussium colbecki and other animals

The red Antarctic sea urchin (Sterechinus neumayeri) has been used in several studies and has become a model organism. This is by far the best-known sea urchin of the region, but not the only species. Among others, the Southern Ocean is also home to the genus Abatus that burrow through the sediment eating the nutrients they find in it. Several species of brittle stars and sea stars live in Antarctic waters, including the ecologically important Odontaster validus and the long-armed Labidiaster annulatus.

Two species of salps are common in Antarctic waters, Salpa thompsoni and Ihlea racovitzai. Salpa thompsoni is found in ice-free areas, whereas Ihlea racovitzai is found in the high latitude areas near ice. Due to their low nutritional value, they are normally only eaten by fish, with larger animals such as birds and marine mammals only eating them when other food is scarce.

Several species of marine worms are found in the Southern Ocean, including Parborlasia corrugatus and Eulagisca gigantea, which at lengths up to 2 m (6.6 ft) and 20 cm (8 in) respectively are examples of Polar gigantism.

Like several other marine species of the region, Antarctic sponges are long-lived. They are sensitive to environmental changes due to the specificity of the symbiotic microbial communities within them. As a result, they function as indicators of environmental health. The largest is the whitish or dull yellowish Anoxycalyx joubini, sometimes called the giant volcano sponge in reference to its shape. It can reach a height of 2 m (6.5 ft) and is an important habitat for several smaller organisms. Long-term observation of individuals of this locally common glass sponge revealed no growth, leading to suggestions of a huge age, perhaps up to 15,000 years (making it one of the longest-lived organisms). However, more recent observations have revealed a highly variable growth rate where individuals seemingly could lack any visible growth for decades, but another was observed to increase its size by almost 30% in only two years and one reached a weight of 76 kg (168 lb) in about 20 years or less.

Jellyfish are also found there, with 2 examples being the Ross Sea jellyfish and the cobweb jellyfish or giant Antarctic jellyfish. The former is small, at 16 cm (6.3 in) in diameter, while the latter can have 1 metre bell diameter and 5-metre-long tentacles.

== Fungi ==
Fungal diversity in Antarctica is lower than in the rest of the world. Individual niches, determined by environmental factors, are filled by very few species. Roughly 1150 fungi species have been identified. Lichens account for 400 of these, while 750 are non-lichenized. Only around 20 species of fungi are macroscopic.

The non-lichenized species come from 416 different genera, representing all major fungi phyla. The first fungi identified from the subantarctic islands was Peziza kerguelensis, which was described in 1847. In 1898 the first species from the mainland, Sclerotium antarcticum, was sampled. Far more terrestrial species have been identified than marine species. Larger species are restricted to the subantarctic islands and the Antarctic Peninsula. Parasitic species have been found in ecological situations different from the one they are associated with elsewhere, such as infecting a different type of host. Less than 2-3% of species are thought to be endemic. Many species are shared with areas of the Arctic. Most fungi are thought to have arrived in Antarctica via airborne currents or birds. The genus Thelebolus for example, arrived on birds some times ago, but have since evolved local strains. Of the non-lichenized species of fungi and closer relatives of fungi discovered, 63% are ascomycota, 23% are basidiomycota, 5% are zygomycota, and 3% are chytridiomycota. The myxomycota and oomycota make up 1% each, although they are not true fungi.

The desert surface is hostile to microscopic fungi due to large fluctuations in temperature on the surface of rocks, which range from 2 °C below the air temperature in the winter to 20 °C above air temperature in the summer. However, the more stable nanoenvironments inside the rocks allow microbial populations to develop. Most communities consist of only a few species. The most studied community occurs in sandstone, and different species arrange themselves in bands at different depths from the rock surface. Microscopic fungi, especially yeasts, have been found in all Antarctic environments.

Antarctica has around 400 lichen species, plants and fungi living symbiotically. They are highly adapted, and can be divided into three main types; crustose lichens, forming thin crusts on the surface, foliose lichens, forming leaf-like lobes, and fruticose lichens, which grow like shrubs. Species are generally divided between those found on the subantarctic islands, those found on the Peninsula, those found elsewhere on the mainland, and those with disjointed distribution. The furthest south a lichen has been identified is 86°30'. Growth rates range from 1 centimetre (0.4 in) every 100 years in the more favourable areas to 1 centimetre (0.4 in) every 1000 years in the more inhospitable areas, and usually occurs when the lichen are protected from the elements with a thin layer of snow, which they can often absorb water vapour from.

=== Lichens ===
Macrolichens (e.g., Usnea sphacelata, U. antarctica, Umbilicaria decussate, and U. aprina) and communities of weakly or non-nitrophilous lichens (e.g., Pseudephebe minuscula, Rhizocarpon superficial, and R. geographicum, and several species of Acarospora and Buellia) are relatively widespread in coastal ice-free areas. Sites with substrates influenced by seabirds are colonized by well-developed communities of nitrophilous lichen species such as Caloplaca athallina, C. citrina, Candelariella flava, Lecanora expectans, Physcia caesia, Rhizoplaca melanophthalma, Xanthoria elegans, and X. mawsonii. In the Dry Valleys the normally epilithic lichen species (Acarospora gwynnii, Buellia frigida, B. grisea, B. pallida, Carbonea vorticosa, Lecanora fuscobrunnea, L. cancriformis, and Lecidella siplei) are found primarily in protected niches beneath the rock surface occupying a cryptoendolithic ecological niche. Lichen species identified in recent research:

- Acarospora spp.
  - Acarospora gwynnii
- Buellia spp.
  - Buellia frigida
  - Buellia grisea
  - Buellia pallida
- Caloplaca athallina
- Caloplaca citrina
- Candelariella flava
- Carbonea vorticosa (form. Carbonea capsulata)
- Lecanora cancriformis
- Lecanora expectans
- Lecanora fuscobrunnea
- Lecidella siplei (form. Lecidea siplei)
- Physcia caesia
- Pseudephebe minuscula
- Rhizocarpon geographicum
- Rhizocarpon superficial
- Rhizoplaca melanophthalma
- Umbilicaria aprina
- Umbilicaria decussate
- Usnea antarctica
- Usnea sphacelata
- Xanthoria elegans
- Xanthoria mawsonii

== Plants ==
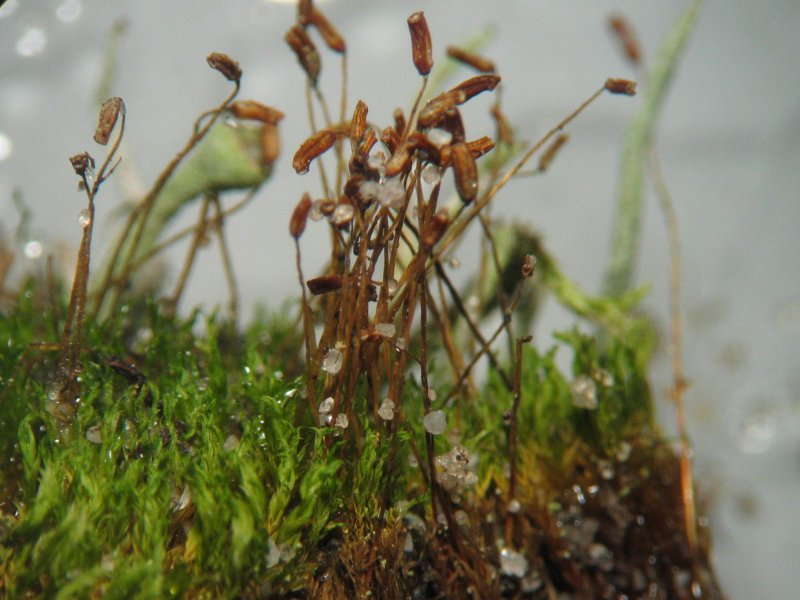
The widespread Ceratodon purpureus is a moss that inhabits areas around the globe, and reaches as far south as 84°30'.

The greatest plant diversity is found on the western edge of the Antarctic Peninsula. Coastal algal blooms can cover up to 2 square kilometres (0.77 sq mi) of the peninsula. Well-adapted moss and lichen can be found in rocks throughout the continent. The subantarctic islands are a more favourable environment for plant growth than the mainland. Human activities, especially whaling and sealing, have caused many introduced species to gain a foothold on the islands, some quite successfully.

Some plant communities exist around fumaroles, vents emitting steam and gas that can reach 60 °C (140 °F) at around 10 centimetres (3.9 in) below the surface. This produces a warmer environment with liquid water due to melting snow and ice. The active volcano Mount Erebus and the dormant Mount Melbourne, both in the continent's interior, each host a fumarole. Two fumaroles also exist on the subantarctic islands, one caused by a dormant volcano on Deception Island in the South Shetland Islands and one on the South Sandwich Islands. The fumarole on Deception Island also supports moss species found nowhere else in Antarctica.

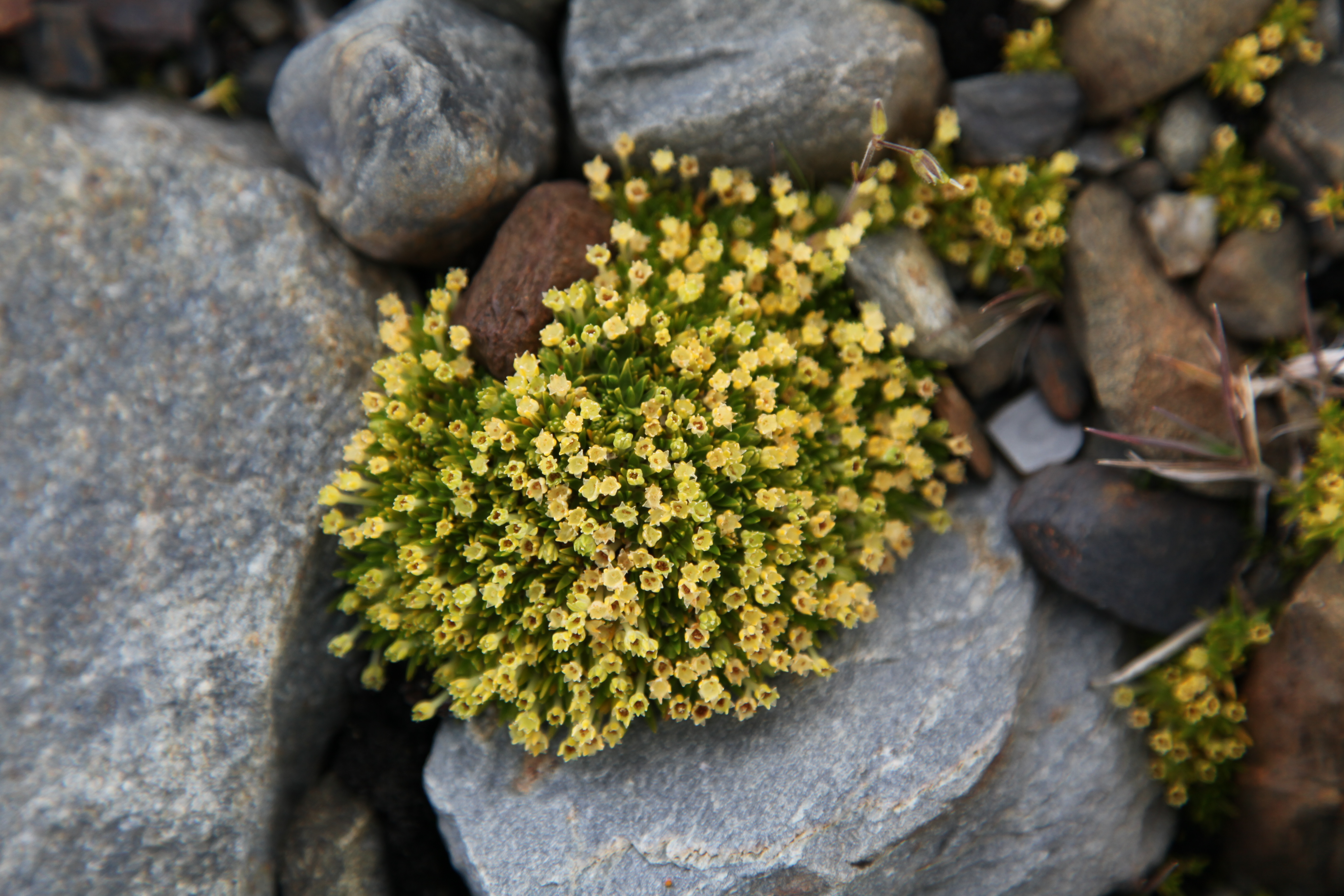
The Antarctic pearlwort (Colobanthus quitensis), one of two flowering plant species in Antarctica.

The bryophytes of Antarctica consist of 100 species of mosses, and about 25 species of liverworts. While not being as widespread as lichens, they remain ubiquitous wherever plants can grow, with Ceratodon purpureus being found as far south as 84°30' on Mount Kyffin. The moss have adapted to tolerate being dried and frozen under the snow for up to 9 months, with a short active period of only 40 to 100 days. Even when the temperature is close to 0 °C, they create their own humid microclimate where the temperature can reach 20 – 30 °C in full sunlight. Unlike most bryophytes, many Antarctic bryophytes rarely produce a diploid sporophyte stage due to extreme environmental conditions. They primarily reproduce asexually, although sexual reproductive structures may be present on the gametophyte. Male and female organs are rarely found on the same plant, making hermafroditic individuals uncommon. Only a minority of species produce a sporophyte, with about 25% of moss species in Continental Antarctica and approximately 30% in Maritime Antarctica forming sporophytes. The Mount Melbourne fumarole supports the only Antarctic population of Campylopus pyriformis, which is otherwise found in Europe and South Africa.

Only two flowering plants inhabit continental Antarctica, the Antarctic hair grass (Deschampsia antarctica), which grow up to 5 centimetres (2 in), and the Antarctic pearlwort (Colobanthus quitensis). Both are found only on the western edge of the Antarctic Peninsula and on two nearby island groups, the South Orkney Islands and the South Shetland Islands. On South Georgia and other subantarctic island there also grow plants such as coastal tussock grass, that can reach 2 metres (7 ft) in height.

=== Mosses ===
The moss species Campylopus pyriformis is restricted to geothermal sites.

Moss species identified in recent research:

- Anomobryum subrotundifolium
- Bryoerythrophyllum recurvirostre
- Bryum anomobryum
- Bryum pseudotriquetrum
- Campylopus pyriformis
- Cephaloziella varians
- Ceratodon purpureus
- Didymodon brachyphyllus
- Grimmia plagiopodia
- Hennediella heimii
- Pohlia nutans
- Sarconeurum glaciale
- Schistidium antarctici (form. Grimmia antarctici)
- Syntrichia princeps

== Others ==
Bacteria have been revived from Antarctic snow hundreds of years old. They have also been found deep under the ice, in Lake Whillans, part of a network of subglacial lakes that sunlight does not reach.

A wide variety of algae are found in Antarctica, often forming the base of food webs. About 400 species of single-celled phytoplankton that float in the water column of the Southern Ocean have been identified. These plankton bloom annually in the spring and summer as day length increases and sea ice retreats, before lowering in number during the winter.

Other algae live in or on the sea ice, often on its underside, or on the seabed in shallow areas. Over 700 seaweed species have been identified, of which 35% are endemic. Outside of the ocean many algae are found in freshwater both on the continent and on the subantarctic islands. Terrestrial algae, such as snow algae, have been found living in soil as far south as 86° 29'. Most are single-celled. In summer algal blooms can cause snow and ice to appear red, green, orange, or gray. These blooms can reach about 10^{6} cells per mL. The dominant group of snow algae is chlamydomonas, a type of green algae.

The largest marine algae are kelp species, which include bull kelp (Durvillaea antarctica), which can reach over 20 metres (66 ft) long and is thought to be the strongest kelp in the world. As many as 47 individual plants can live on 1 square metre (10.8 sq ft), and they can grow at 60 centimetres (24 in) a day. Kelp that is broken off its anchor provides a valuable food source for many animals, as well as providing a method of oceanic dispersal for animals such as invertebrates to travel across the Southern Ocean by riding floating kelp.

== Conservation ==
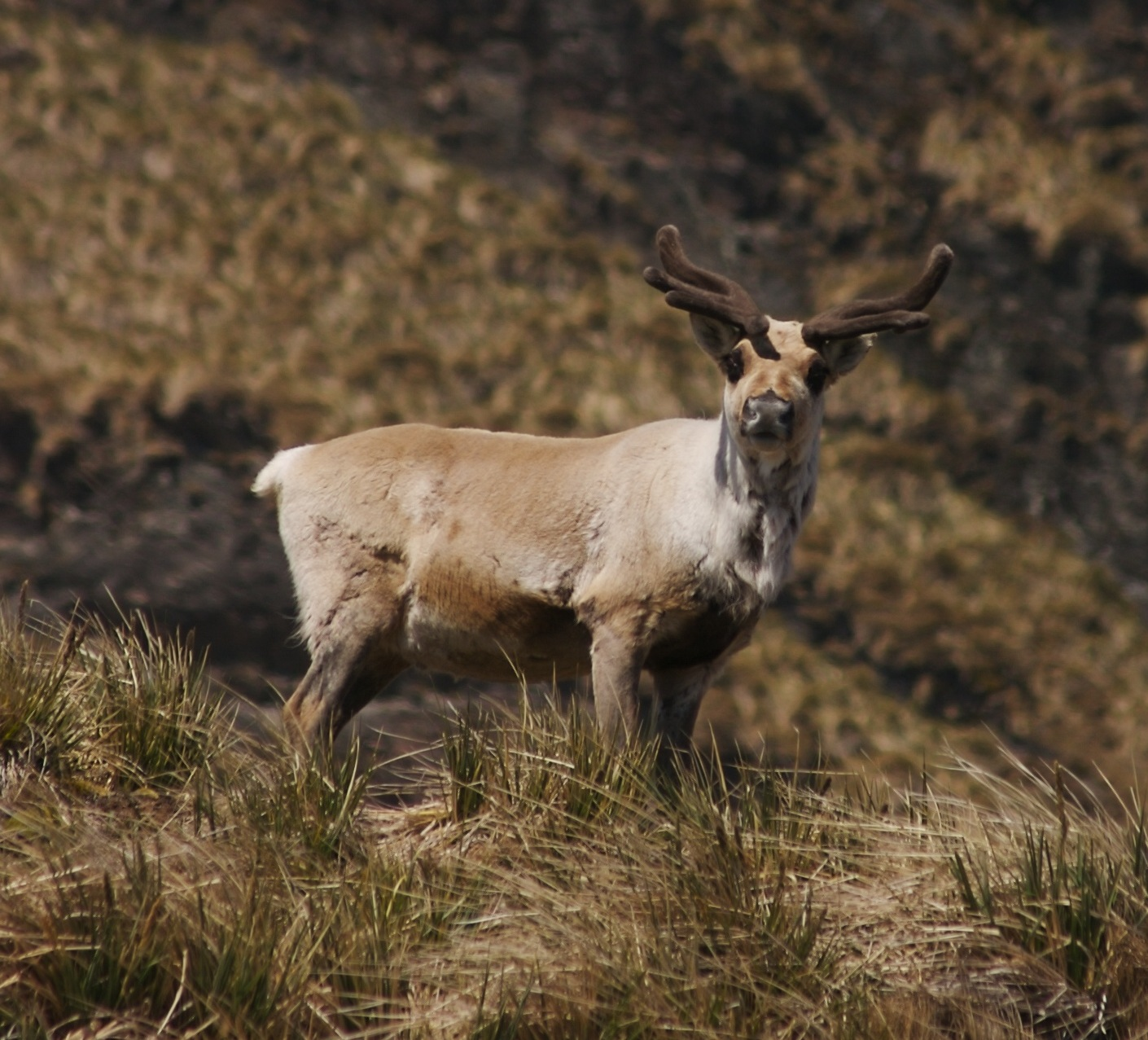
An individual with velvet-covered antlers from the southern herd of the introduced reindeer in South Georgia.

Human activity poses significant risk for Antarctic wildlife, causing problems such as pollution, habitat destruction, and wildlife disturbance. These problems are especially acute around research stations. Climate change and its associated effects pose significant risk to the future of Antarctica's natural environment.

Due to the historical isolation of Antarctic wildlife, they are easily outcompeted and threatened by introduced species, also brought by human activity. Many introduced species have already established themselves, with rats a particular threat, especially to nesting seabirds whose eggs they eat. Illegal fishing remains an issue, as overfishing poses a great threat to krill and toothfish populations. Toothfish, slow-growing, long-lived fish that have previously suffered from overfishing, are particularly at risk. Illegal fishing also brings further risks through the use of techniques banned in regulated fishing, such as gillnetting and longline fishing. These methods increase the bycatch of animals such as albatrosses.

Subantarctic islands fall under the jurisdiction of national governments, with environmental regulation following the laws of those countries. Some islands are in addition protected through obtaining the status of a UNESCO World Heritage Site. The Antarctic Treaty System regulates all activity in latitudes south of 60°S, and designates Antarctica as a natural reserve for science. Under this system all activity must be assessed for its environmental impact. Part of this system, the Convention for the Conservation of Antarctic Marine Living Resources, regulates fishing and protects marine areas.
