= Usnea pallidocarpa =

Scientific classification
- Kingdom: Fungi
- Division: Ascomycota
- Class: Lecanoromycetes
- Order: Lecanorales
- Family: Parmeliaceae
- Genus: Usnea
- Species: U. pallidocarpa

Binomial name
- Usnea pallidocarpa Wirtz & Lumbsch (2011)
- Holotype site: Cerro Catedral, Argentina

Species of lichen

Usnea pallidocarpa is a species of saxicolous (rock-dwelling) beard lichen in the family Parmeliaceae. It is known from Argentina.

== Taxonomy ==
The lichen was formally described as new to science in 2011 by the lichenologists Nora Wirtz and H. Thorsten Lumbsch. The type was collected from the Cerro Catedral in Bariloche (Río Negro), at an elevation of 1,900 m (6,200 ft). The species epithet pallidocarpa refers to the pale-coloured discs of the apothecium. Molecular phylogenetics analysis suggests a close relationship with Usnea messutiae, another Usnea species from Argentina described later the same year.

== Description ==
Usnea pallidocarpa is characterised by its shrubby, erect appearance and a thallus (the body of the lichen) that typically measures between 5 and 7 cm in length. This lichen originates from a holdfast, which is the anchoring part of the lichen, appearing either unpigmented or with a brownish hue. The main branches of the thallus taper towards the holdfast and have a somewhat dichotomous to richly branched structure with rounded (terete) branches. The surface of these branches is a yellow-green colour, which is both smooth and glossy, and is sparsely marked with faveoles, or tiny pits.

Usnea pallidocarpa has a unique feature among some morphotypes – a "compressed" form where the side branches are thick, claw-like, and darkly pigmented, akin to the characteristics seen in U. perpusilla. The lichen's main branches lack pigmentation, while the side branches may display variegated bands of black pigment. Another aspect of this lichen is the presence of cortex annulations, or ring-like structures on the cortex, though it lacks papillae. Fibrils (small fibers) are very rare in this species.

The medulla, the innermost layer of the thallus, is dense in Usnea pallidocarpa. Its central axis, a structural component, is rather thick, occupying about 34 to 71 percent of the branch diameter. Unlike some other lichen species, Usnea pallidocarpa does not produce soredia or isidiomorphs – propagules involved in asexual reproduction.

This lichen frequently develops apothecia, which are spore-producing structures. These are typically found in more or less terminal positions on the branches, though they can occasionally occur in series. As they mature, the apothecia transition from a cupular shape to a flatter or undulate (wavy) form. The disc of the apothecia ranges in colour from light yellow to brownish and may sometimes have black blotches or shading. The smooth excipulum, or the outer layer of the apothecia, encloses a thin margin that often becomes excluded, with only a few rays extending outward.

Usnea pallidocarpa produces eight simple, ellipsoid, hyaline (translucent) ascospores per ascus (the spore-bearing structure). The photobiont – the photosynthesizing partner in the lichen symbiosis – is of the trebouxioid type. The secondary chemistry of Usnea pallidocarpa is characterised by an inconsistent presence of hypostrepsilic acid, as identified by thin-layer chromatography.

== Habitat and distribution ==
Usnea pallidocarpa is known to occur only in a single location within the Argentinean Andean Cordillera in the southern part of South America. This lichen is an alpine species, growing at an elevation of about 1800 metres. It typically grows on rocks and is found in the company of other lichen species such as U. lambii, U. perpusilla, and U. sphacelata.

== See also ==
- List of Usnea species
