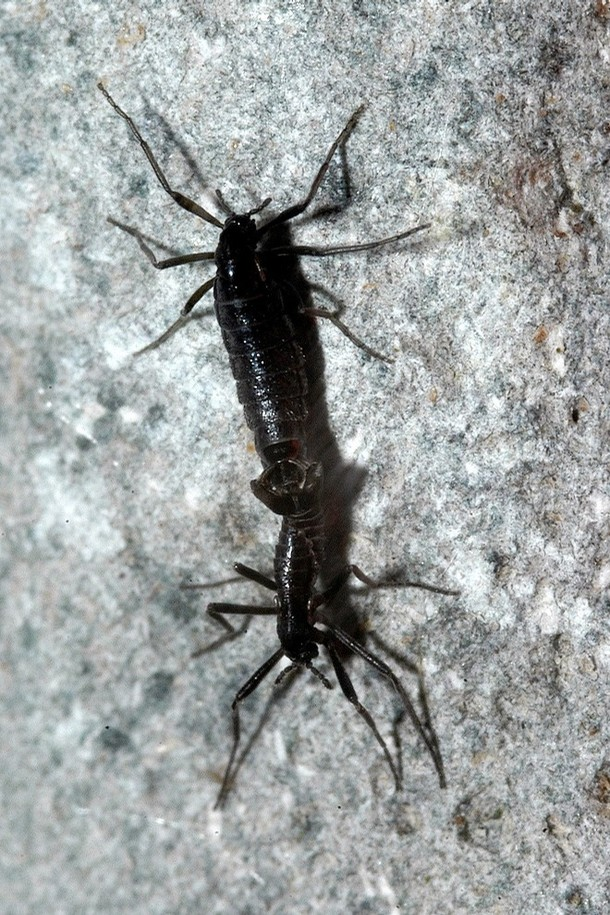
- Belgica antarctica

Scientific classification
- Domain: Eukaryota
- Kingdom: Animalia
- Phylum: Arthropoda
- Class: Insecta
- Order: Diptera
- Family: Chironomidae
- Subfamily: Orthocladiinae
- Genus: Belgica; Jacobs, 1900

Type species
- Belgica antarctica Jacobs, 1900

Species
- 2 recognized species, see article (which article?).

Synonyms
- Protobelgica Séguy, 1965

= Belgica (fly) =

Genus of flies

Belgica is a flightless midge genus in the family Chironomidae. It contains the following two species:

- Belgica albipes (Séguy, 1965), found in the Crozet Islands (Îles Crozet) in the southern Indian Ocean
- Belgica antarctica Jacobs, 1900, found in the maritime Antarctic
