= Usnea messutiae =

Scientific classification
- Kingdom: Fungi
- Division: Ascomycota
- Class: Lecanoromycetes
- Order: Lecanorales
- Family: Parmeliaceae
- Genus: Usnea
- Species: U. messutiae

Binomial name
- Usnea messutiae Wirtz & Lumbsch (2011)

Species of lichen-forming fungus

Usnea messutiae is a species of saxicolous (rock-dwelling) fruticose lichen in the family Parmeliaceae. It forms small, shrubby tufts about 3–4 cm (1.2–1.6 in) tall with yellow-green branches that may be partially or entirely blackened, especially toward the tips. This alpine lichen grows on rocks at high elevations in the Andes of Argentina and Ecuador, where it has been found between 800 and 5,000 m (2,600 and 16,400 ft) elevation.

== Taxonomy ==
"Neuropogonoid" is an informal name used for certain Usnea species with black pigmentation in the cortex (and usually dark apothecial disks) that are most often found on siliceous rocks in polar regions or at high elevations. Molecular studies have shown that the neuropogonoid growth form has evolved more than once, so it is treated within Usnea rather than as a separate genus.

Usnea messutiae was described as a new species in 2011 from the Andean Cordillera. The holotype was collected in Santa Cruz Province, Argentina, north of El Chaltén at about 800 m (2,600 ft) elevation. In a three-locus phylogenetic analysis, it formed a strongly supported clade with Usnea pallidocarpa and had previously been treated as an undescribed lineage. The authors separated U. messutiae from U. pallidocarpa by its dot-like (punctiform) soralia and the absence of observed apothecia, and they distinguished it from similar species such as U. subantarctica and U. acromelana by its dense growth, very sparse papillae, and a rough, pitted thallus surface with a largely unpigmented, proliferating holdfast. The specific epithet honors the Argentine lichenologist Maria Ines Messuti.

A phylogenomic study using reference-based RAD sequencing (RADseq) recovered Usnea messutiae as a distinct lineage within neuropogonoid Usnea and as the sister species of U. pallidocarpa. In that analysis, U. perpusilla was placed as sister to the U. messutiae–U. pallidocarpa clade, consistent with treating these taxa within the U. perpusilla complex. Divergence-time estimates in the same study dated the split of the U. messutiae–U. pallidocarpa lineage to about 2.6 million years ago.

== Description ==
Usnea messutiae forms small, erect, shrubby thalli about 3–4 cm (1.2–1.6 in) tall. It grows from a proliferating holdfast (attachment base) that is usually unpigmented, with main branches that taper toward the base; the thallus is richly branched with round (terete) branches, and a single stronger main branch may split into two near the tip. The surface is yellow-green and typically rough and pitted (foveolate). The main branches are generally unpigmented, while side branches may show bands of black pigment or become entirely black toward the tips, and ring-like annulations on the cortex are common and sometimes pigmented.

Papillae (small, conically rounded gowths) are rare, but fine side branches (fibrils) are common and may be pale or black. Internally, the medulla is dense and the central axis is thick, comprising roughly 35–60% of the branch diameter. The species reproduces by soralia (powdery reproductive spots) that are small and dot-like, often convex and hemispherical, sometimes fusing together; they are most frequent near the tips of side branches and develop from fibril scars. The soredia are usually convex and often develop into blackish isidiomorphs (isidia-like outgrowths) that may elongate into fibril-like structures. Apothecia and pycnidia have not been observed. Chemically, it contains usnic acid and has been reported with a hypostrepsilic acid chemosyndrome, along with an unidentified substance.

== Habitat and distribution ==
Usnea messutiae is an alpine, rock-dwelling lichen known from a small number of localities in the Andean Cordillera of Argentina and Ecuador. In southern South America it has been reported from around 800 m elevation and has been collected with other neuropogonoid Usnea species, including U. aurantiaco-atra, U. acromelana, U. subantarctica, U. trachycarpa, and U. sphacelata.

In Ecuador it has been reported from high elevations, around 5,000 m (16,000 ft), where it has been found in a community with Usnea sphacelata. Documented collections include Santa Cruz Province, Argentina (north of El Chalten) and Rio Negro Province (Cerro Catedral, 1,850 m), and in Ecuador on Chimborazo volcano at about 4,600–4,900 m (15,100–16,100 ft) elevation.

== See also ==
- List of Usnea species
