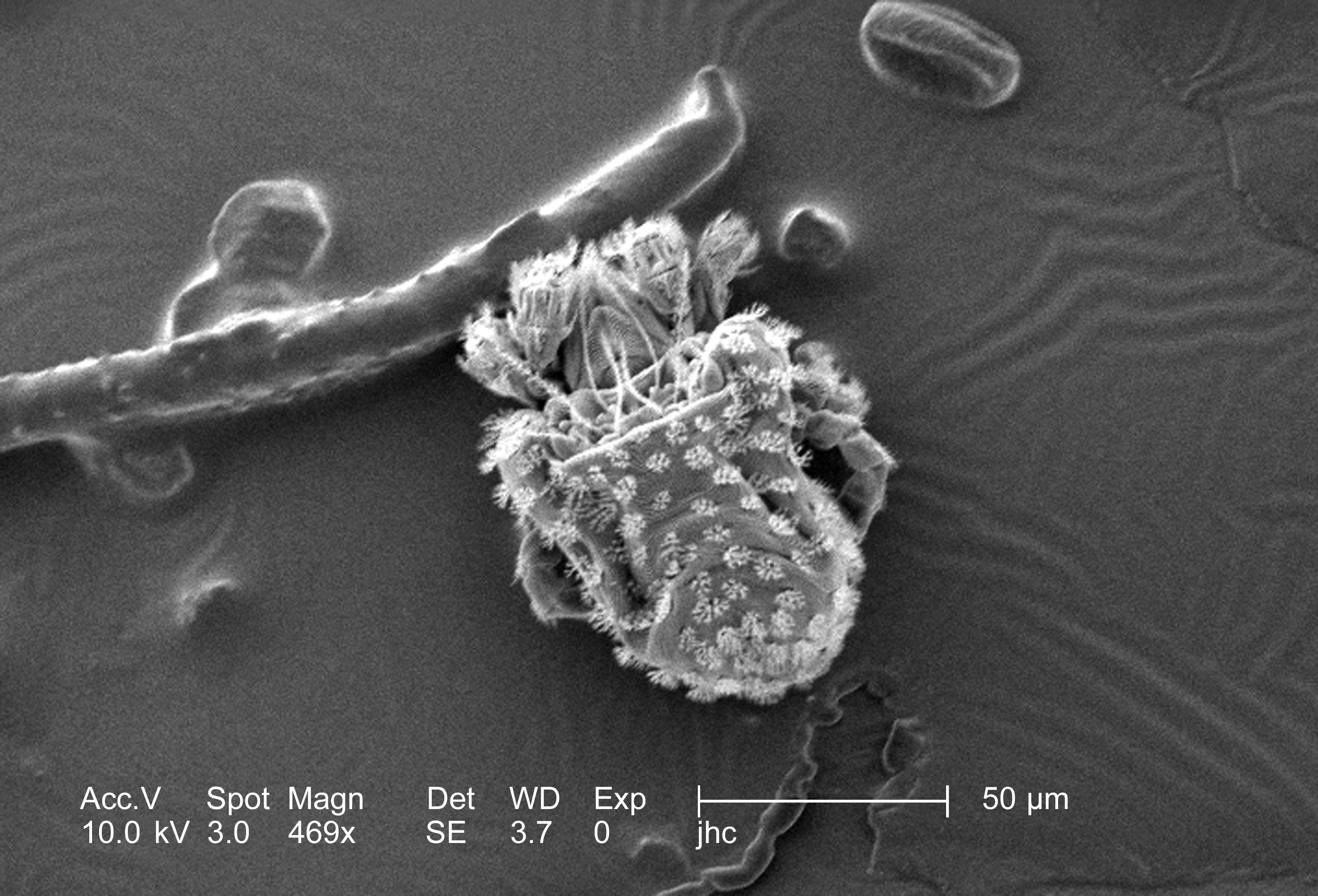
- Endeostigmata:Nanorchestidae:Nanorchestes

Scientific classification
- Kingdom: Animalia
- Phylum: Arthropoda
- Subphylum: Chelicerata
- Class: Arachnida
- Suborder: Endeostigmata
- Family: Nanorchestidae; Grandjean, 1937

= Nanorchestidae =

Nanorchestidae Temporal range: Devonian–present

Family of mites

Nanorchestidae is a family of endeostigs in the order Endeostigmata. There are at least two genera and two described species in Nanorchestidae.

Mites of the family Nanorchestidae live in soil throughout world and may live in both hot and very cold deserts. While mites of the genus Speleorchestes are able to live in the hottest deserts, those of the genus Nanorchestes live in the coldest areas on earth. Nanorchestes antarcticus, at a size of around a quarter of a millimeter, occurs in Antarctic soil and, to a lesser extent, on glaciers.

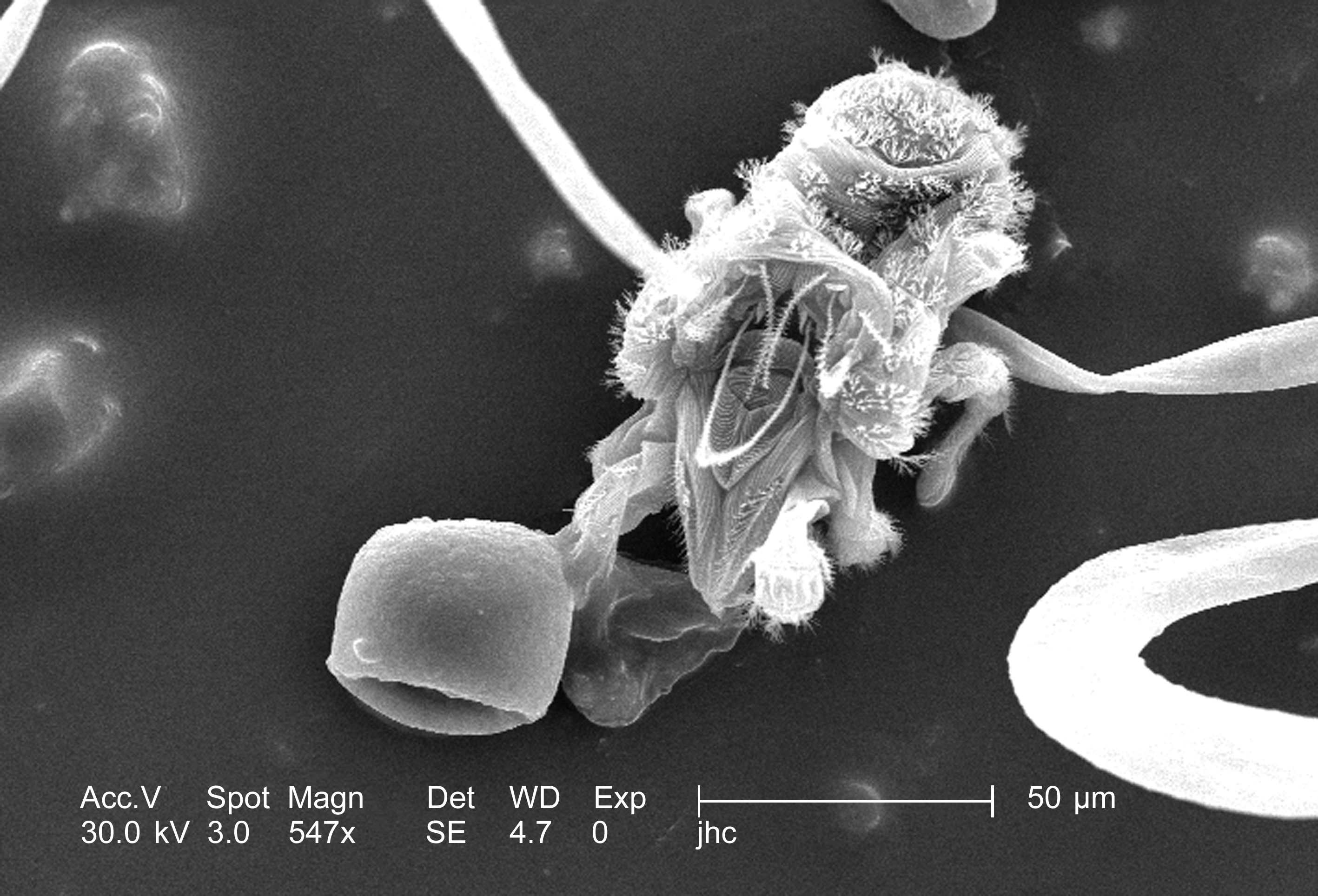
Nanorchestes

== Genera ==
- Nanorchestes Topsent & Trouessart, 1890
- Speleorchestes Trägårdh, 1909
