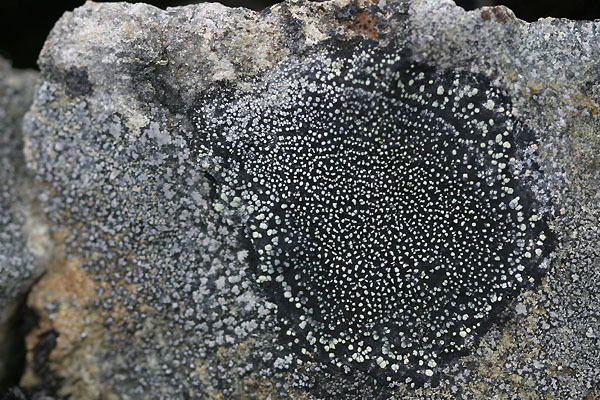

Scientific classification
- Kingdom: Fungi
- Division: Ascomycota
- Class: Lecanoromycetes
- Order: Caliciales
- Family: Caliciaceae
- Genus: Buellia
- Species: B. frigida

Binomial name
- Buellia frigida Darb. (1910)

Synonyms
- Buellia quercina Darb. (1910); Rinodina frigida (Darb.) C.W.Dodge (1948); Beltraminia frigida (Darb.) C.W.Dodge (1973)

= Buellia frigida =

Species of lichen

Buellia frigida is a species of saxicolous (rock-dwelling), crustose lichen in the family Caliciaceae. It was first described from samples collected from the British National Antarctic Expedition of 1901–1904. It is endemic to maritime and continental Antarctica, where it is common and widespread, at altitudes up to about 2,000 m (6,600 ft). The characteristic appearance of this lichen features shades of grey and black divided into small polygonal patterns. The crusts can generally grow up to 7 cm (2 3/4 in) in diameter (smaller sizes are more common), although neighbouring individuals may coalesce to form larger crusts. One of the defining characteristics of the lichen is a textured surface with deep cracks, creating the appearance of radiating lobes. These lobes, bordered by shallower fissures, give the lichen a distinctive appearance and textured surface.

In addition to its striking appearance, Buellia frigida shows adaptability to the harsh Antarctic climate conditions. The lichen has an extremely slow growth rate, estimated to be less than 1 mm (1/16 in) per century. Because of its ability to not only endure but to thrive in one of the Earth's coldest, harshest environments, Buellia frigida has been used as a model organism in astrobiology research. This lichen has been exposed to conditions simulating those encountered in space and on celestial bodies like Mars, including vacuum, ultraviolet radiation, and extreme dryness. B. frigida has demonstrated resilience to these space-related stressors, making it a candidate for studying how life can adapt to and potentially survive in the extreme environments found beyond Earth.

== Taxonomy ==
The lichen was described in 1910 by the British botanist Otto Darbishire. The type specimen was collected by Reginald Koettlitz in 1902 from Granite Harbour in McMurdo Sound growing on tuff. The samples were obtained as part of the British National Antarctic Expedition of 1901–1904. The diagnosis of the lichen was as follows (translated from Latin (Note: Passage translated by GPT-4.)):

Thick crust, brownish-gray, continuous or more often discontinuous, forming small spots, fissured and broken, often somewhat tubercular-granulous, with a darker and distinct margin, and a separate hypothallus; apothecia black, initially immersed in the thallus, marginate, later emerging, unmarginate, flat or convex, 0.5–1.0 mm wide; epithecium black or occasionally (in the same specimen) decolourised; hypothecium darkening to brownish or occasionally decolourised or carbonaceous; apothecia occasionally containing gonidia in an amphithecium (similar to Rinodina species), but when mature, always without an amphithecium; spores eight, brown, bicellular, 0.009–0.015 mm.

Darbishire observed that the newly described species appeared to belong to the genus Buellia. However, he noted that in its early stages of development, the apothecium sometimes had lecanorine characteristics, sharing features with genus Rinodina. He noted that the hypothecium, a specific layer of tissue in the lichen's apothecium, was often carbonaceous (blackened), particularly near the edges of the apothecium. Darbishire acknowledged the close relationship between the genera Buellia and Rinodina. In 1948, Carroll William Dodge proposed to transfer the taxon to genus Rinodina; however, the name Rinodina frigida was not validly published by Dodge. Later, in 1973, Dodge placed the taxon in genus Beltraminia as Beltraminia frigida in his work Lichen Flora of the Antarctic Continent and Adjacent Islands. The genus Beltraminia has since been synonymised with Dimelaena. In her 1968 monograph on Antarctic lichens, Elke Mackenzie supported Darbishire's placement in Buellia, largely because of the lecideine structure of the mature apothecia, wherein the disc lacks a thalline margin.

Darbishire also simultaneously described Buellia quercina, collected at the same type locality as B. frigidia, but with a more effigurate margin and lighter colour. MacKenzie rejected taxonomic value for variations in the black, grey, and whitish colours of the thallus due to anatomical variations of the lichen, and reduced B. quercina to synonymy.

A 2016 molecular phylogenetics study of the Caliciaceae included B. frigida in its analysis. In the constructed phylogenetic tree, this species appeared as sister (closest evolutionary relative) to Amandinea coniops; the clade containing these two species was itself sister to Amandinea punctata; a similar result was obtained in a molecular analysis published in 2023. It is known that the genus Buellia itself is not monophyletic (derived from a single common ancestor).

== Description ==
Buellia frigida is a crustose lichen (sometimes placodioid) with a variable thallus size, more or less circular in outline. It has a diameter of up to 7 cm (2 3/4 in), although it is often much smaller. The thallus is characterised by a black hypothallus that extends approximately 5–7.5 millimetres (3/16–5/16 in) beyond the older central region of thallus; this black area represents the growth zone. In some instances, neighbouring thalli coalesce to form larger aggregations of up to 50 cm (20 in). Its margin is somewhat fimbriate, sometimes barely visible, and its older, central thallus has a deeply rimose appearance, giving rise to the impression of radiating marginal lobes. These lobes are further defined by shallower cracks, creating a surface divided into polygonal areoles. The areoles have a somewhat cerebriform (brainlike) texture and can vary in colour from grey to black, with the tips of the marginal lobes typically appearing black. An amorphous layer, approximately 35–40 μm thick, covers the thallus. This layer, mucilaginous in nature, may appear white when it is dry.

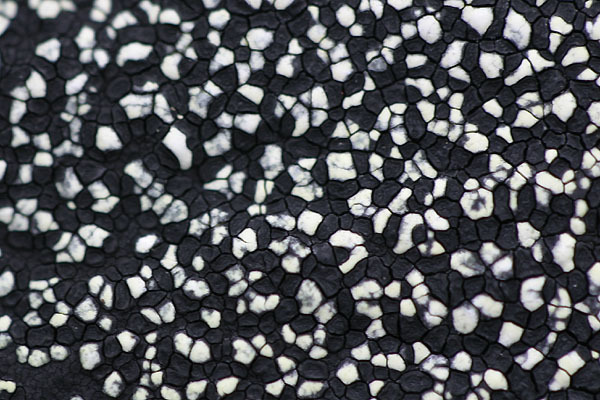
Closeup of thallus surface in older central region, comprising angular grey to black areoles

The upper cortex of B. frigida is about 6–7 μm thick. It has a rounded or swollen top (capitate) and grows in a dense, upright, and parallel arrangement (fastigiate). However, it appears as a single layer of dark, thick-walled cells that are equal in diameter in all dimensions (isodiametric). The algal layer within the thallus varies in thickness, containing cells of Trebouxia measuring between 4–7 μm in diameter. The medulla, composed of loosely woven, thin-walled hyphae that are somewhat vertically arranged, also has variability in thickness. The medulla stabilises the thallus structure and helps regulate water retention and gas exchange in the lichen. Beneath the medulla, there is a basal layer, approximately 15 μm thick, of compact dark brown cells that elongate upward and merge with the medullary hyphae. Medullary hyphae also help the thallus adhere tightly to the substratum.

Buellia frigida forms black, slightly shiny apothecia, which are often more or less sessile on the older areoles. The apothecia start as flat discs but become convex as they mature. When young, they have a lecanorine appearance; when mature they are lecideine in form, and up to about 1 mm in diameter. The amphithecial cortex is about 15–17 μm thick, formed by a palisade of isodiametric cells. Algae that initially exist between the medullary hyphae disappear as the apothecia age. The medulla of the apothecia consists of vertical brown hyphae that are loosely woven and connected to the thalline medulla. The proper margin is not differentiated in older apothecia; instead, the amphithecial cortex darkens, and the medullary hyphae shrink together after the algae disappear, creating the impression of a dimidiate proper margin (i.e. divided into two equal or nearly equal halves). The hypothecium is brownish, with a thickness ranging from 30 to 80 μm in the centre and thinning towards the margin, where it merges with the amphithecial cortex. The ascus, which contains the ascospores, stands approximately 90–110 μm tall. Paraphyses, measuring 2 μm in diameter, darken above the asci and have an internal partition, or septum. The asci are clavate, with dimensions of 36–46 by 14.5–17 μm, and contain dark brown, bilocular ascospores (divided into two segments by a septum). These ascospores are occasionally only slightly constricted at the septum, and some may remain unilocular. They are typically ellipsoid, with dimensions of 9–13 by 5–8 μm.

Asexual propagules, such as isidia or soredia, are not made by Buellia frigida. The lichen, however, does create pycnidia that originate from under the algal layer, appearing ampulliform (with a rounded or bulbous form with a narrower portion or neck) to irregular and reaching sizes of up to 300 μm in diameter. A thin perifulcrum, consisting of very small-celled pseudoparenchyma, surrounds the pycnidia. Conidiophores have a few septa and are branched at the base, measuring approximately 10 by 1 μm. The terminal conidia are ellipsoid, measuring about 4 by 1 μm in size.

=== Similar species ===
Buellia subfrigida, described in 1993 and found in the Lützow-Holm Bay area and the Prince Olav Coast of East Antarctica, is closely related to Buellia frigida. Both species are part of a species pair (a closely related duo differing in key traits), with B. subfrigida likely evolving from the sexually reproducing B. frigida through the acquisition of soredia. The species share morphological and chemical traits, forming circular thalli with distinct effigurate lobes at their margins, and have similar chemical profiles. However, B. subfrigida differs by its sorediate thallus. This adaptation allows B. subfrigida to grow in habitats that are seasonally inundated with water, a niche where B. frigida, despite its wide ecological amplitude (the limits of environmental conditions within which an organism can live and function), is rarely observed.

== Habitat, distribution, and ecology ==
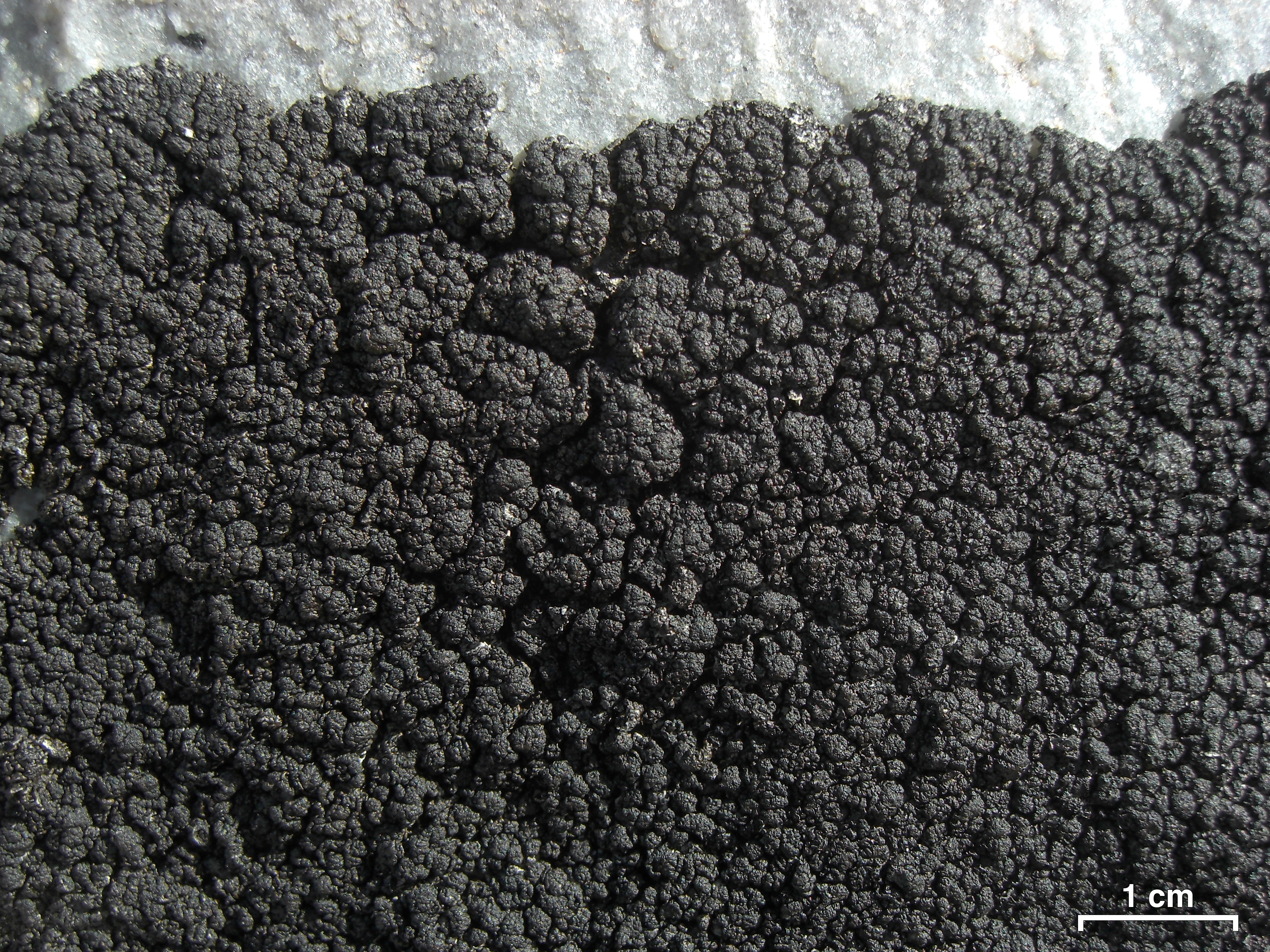
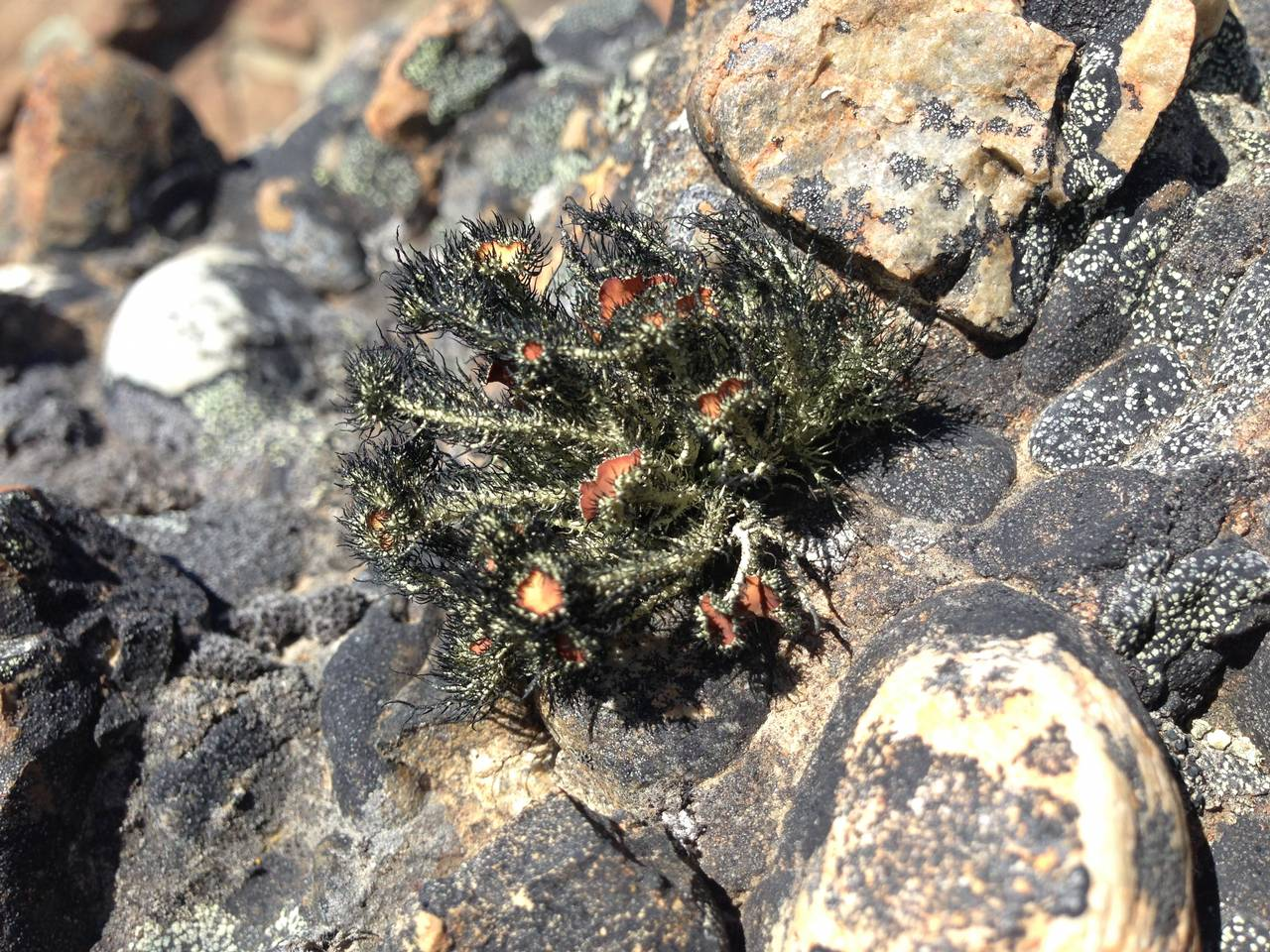
Pseudephebe minuscula (left) and Usnea sphacelata (right) are lichens that often establish themselves on the thalli of Buellia frigida in the Antarctic environment.

Buellia frigida is endemic to the maritime and continental Antarctic, growing in ice-free areas on exposed rock surfaces. On these surfaces, it prefers sheltered areas like crevasses or drainage channels. In crevasses, thalli chains grow larger near the ground. In its habitat, Buellia frigida is often the only species that colonises smooth, ice-polished rock. Once its thallus is about 2 cm (1 in) or more in diameter, Pseudephebe minuscula or Usnea sphacelata often begin growing near its centre. This secondary lichen growth degrades underlying B. frigida, leaving outer rings of healthy crustose lichen. The umbilicate lichen Umbilicaria decussata is another species that grows on Buellia frigida. Buellia frigida associates with different species across habitats. Near Syowa Station, a small community of Buellia frigida and Rhizocarpon flavum grows on slopes without nesting colonies of petrels and other birds. The nitrogen-enriched areas beneath bird nests have a more diverse lichen community, which, in addition to B. frigida, includes species from the genera Caloplaca, Umbilicaria, and Xanthoria. Phaeosporobolus usneae is a lichenicolous (lichen-dwelling) fungus that parasitises the thalli of B. frigida in Bunger Hills (Wilkes Land). Despite genetic evidence suggesting limited dispersal capabilities, B. frigida shows remarkable symbiotic flexibility, being able to associate with up to 13 different photobionts – one of the highest numbers recorded among Antarctic lichens.

Buellia frigida is among the most common lichens in Antarctica, particularly in eastern regions. The distribution of B. frigida extends throughout Antarctica, from the Peninsula to rocky coastal areas and exposed rock formations in the interior. It is one of about 25 lichen species that occur circumpolar in coastal areas and extend inland to nunataks and mountains near the South Pole. It is the most widespread lichen in east Antarctica, including the Larsemann Hills, but it is somewhat rare in Marie Byrd Land and the King Edward VII Land, increasing in Victoria Land and most common on Antarctica's eastern coast. It is most abundant in Victoria Land's dry valley region and higher elevations above 600 m (2,000 ft), known for cloud cover and summer snow. The lichen has been found at altitudes of up to 2,015 m (6,611 ft). About 2,500 m (8,200 ft) marks the altitudinal limit at which lichens can survive in the Antarctic. Above this height, the long periods of exposure to −60 to −70 °C (−76 to −94 °F) winter temperatures and the lack of insulating snow cover on windblown rock faces is too harsh to support lichen life.

The species typically forms communities in wind-protected areas, particularly in rock cracks and on the leeward side of rocks. These communities can consist of B. frigida alone or occur with other saxicolous lichens such as Lecidea cancriformis, Acarospora gwynnii, Carbonea vorticosa, Pseudephebe minuscula, Physcia caesia, and Lecidella siplei. On the less lichen-populated Antarctic Peninsula, it is confined to the western part, south of 67°S latitude. Collections of Buellia frigida are typically made in coastal areas, and its inland range in the continent's interior remains unknown. It is one of 20 species of Buellia that occur in Antarctica.

== Physiological adaptations and growth ==
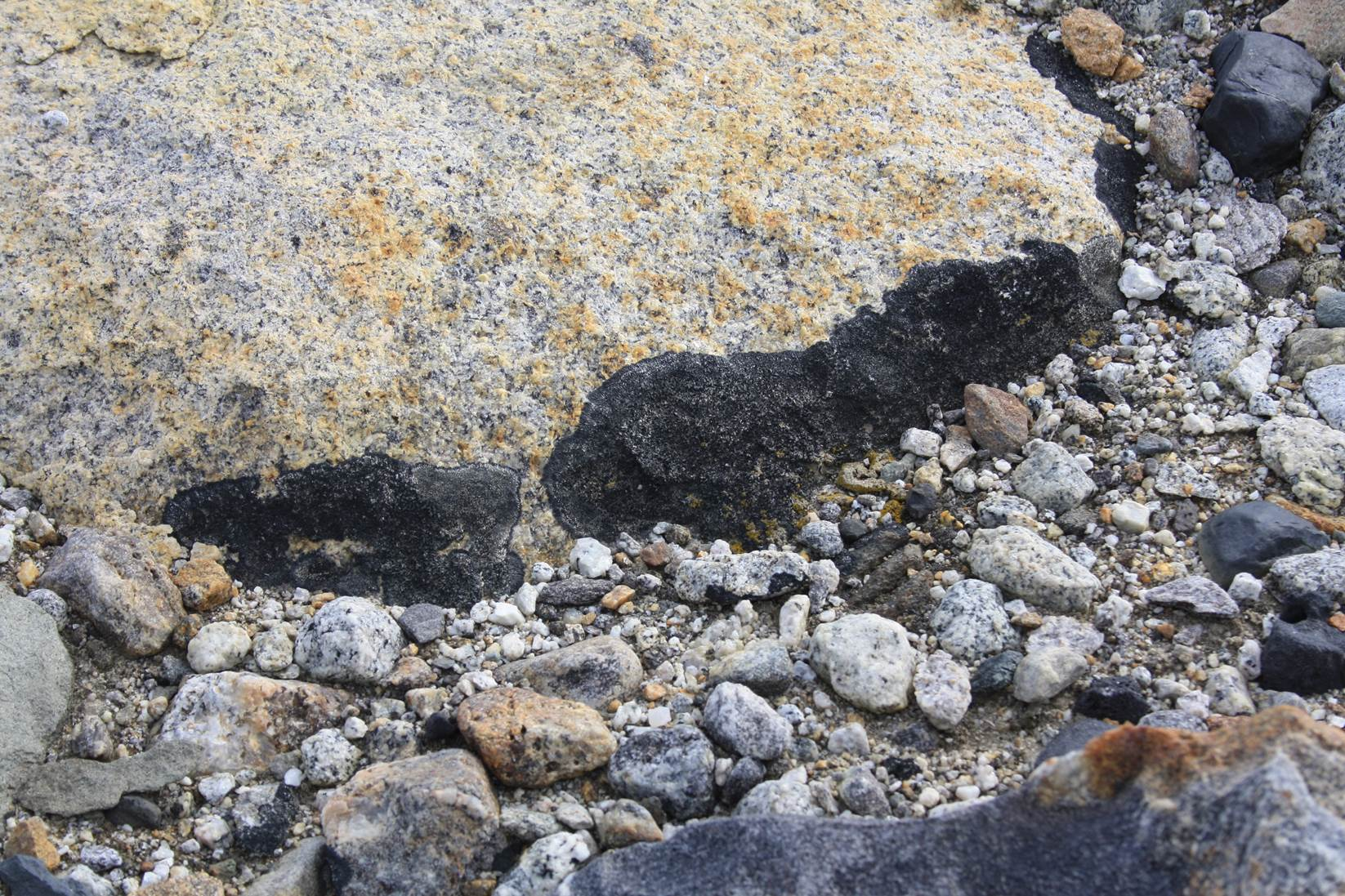
Several Buellia frigida thalli growing around the base of a large rock; photographed in 2015 as part of the GANOVEX 11 expedition in northern Victoria Land

This lichen experiences high fluxes of photosynthetically active radiation, desiccation, and cold temperatures. The Net Assimilation Rate (NAR) measures how organisms convert light and carbon dioxide into organic substances through photosynthesis, minus respiration. Buellia frigida's maximum NAR occurs at 10 °C (50 °F) with full thallus hydratation, showing its photosynthetic efficiency in polar ecosystems. Buellia frigida tolerates the harsh conditions of Antarctica. Its dark colouration is the result of pigmentation that protects it from harmful ultraviolet radiation, which is even greater at high latitudes and altitudes. Hydration swells the lichen thallus, which reduces the density of its black pigmentation in the cortex. This exposes the algal layer to light, enabling photosynthesis. When dry, the thallus shrinks, increasing the density of its pigmentation and shielding itself from light; this effect is most prevalent in the marginal areas, which contain the most algae. In situ measurements of this lichen's photosynthetic activity were conducted in continental Antarctica, showing it thrives in its habitat. Its high photosynthetic rate indicates adaptation to Antarctica's extreme conditions like low temperatures and intense light. This adaptability enables its survival in this region, where it is exposed to fluctuating moisture levels due to drying cycles of meltwater-soaked thalli. The photobiont partner of Buellia frigida has a higher cold resistance potential and a longer retention of photosynthetic capacity during exposure to freezing temperatures than the counterpart photobiont of several other Antarctic and European lichens.

Moisture availability determines Buellia frigida's distribution. At Cape Geology, southern Victoria Land, it primarily relies on meltwater from snowpack and occasional snowfalls for moisture in early summer. Despite the strong sunlight, the lichen survives in the combination of hydration, low temperatures, and intense light exposure. The distribution of lichen thalli on rock surfaces is influenced by the frequency and duration of meltwater moistening, reflecting its need for moisture.

Studies in continental Antarctica show the extremely slow radial growth rates of Buellia frigida. A monitoring study conducted in Yukidori Valley, no measurable increase in size was noted for any of the measured thalli after a five-year period. In the McMurdo Dry Valleys, the lichen growth rates varied across different sites, indicating responses to regional climate changes, including alterations in snowfall patterns. This adaptation over time demonstrates the lichen's resilience to changing environmental conditions in Antarctica, suggesting its use as an indicator of climate change in the region. Geographic information system technology has been used to detect subtle changes in the growth of Buellia frigida over a 42-year period. At radial growth rates of 0.0036 mm per year—about the thickness of an individual fungal hypha—some thalli are estimated to be at least 6,500 years old, dating back to the end of the Stone Age.

Studies on the population genetics of Buellia frigida indicate limited dispersal among regions in Antarctica, likely influenced by prevailing wind patterns and physical barriers such as glaciers. While the spores of B. frigida have the potential for wind-assisted dispersal, the lichen predominantly colonises specific areas conducive to its growth, particularly those with sufficient moisture during the short Antarctic summer, showing how environmental factors affect its dispersal. Samples of B. frigida collected from eastern Antarctica's Vestfold Hills and Mawson Station revealed minimal genetic variation: only three genotypes in the Vestfold Hills, differing by a single nucleotide. The most common genotype of B. frigida there matched specimens from Mawson Station, showing low genetic diversity across this large Antarctic region.

== In astrobiology research ==
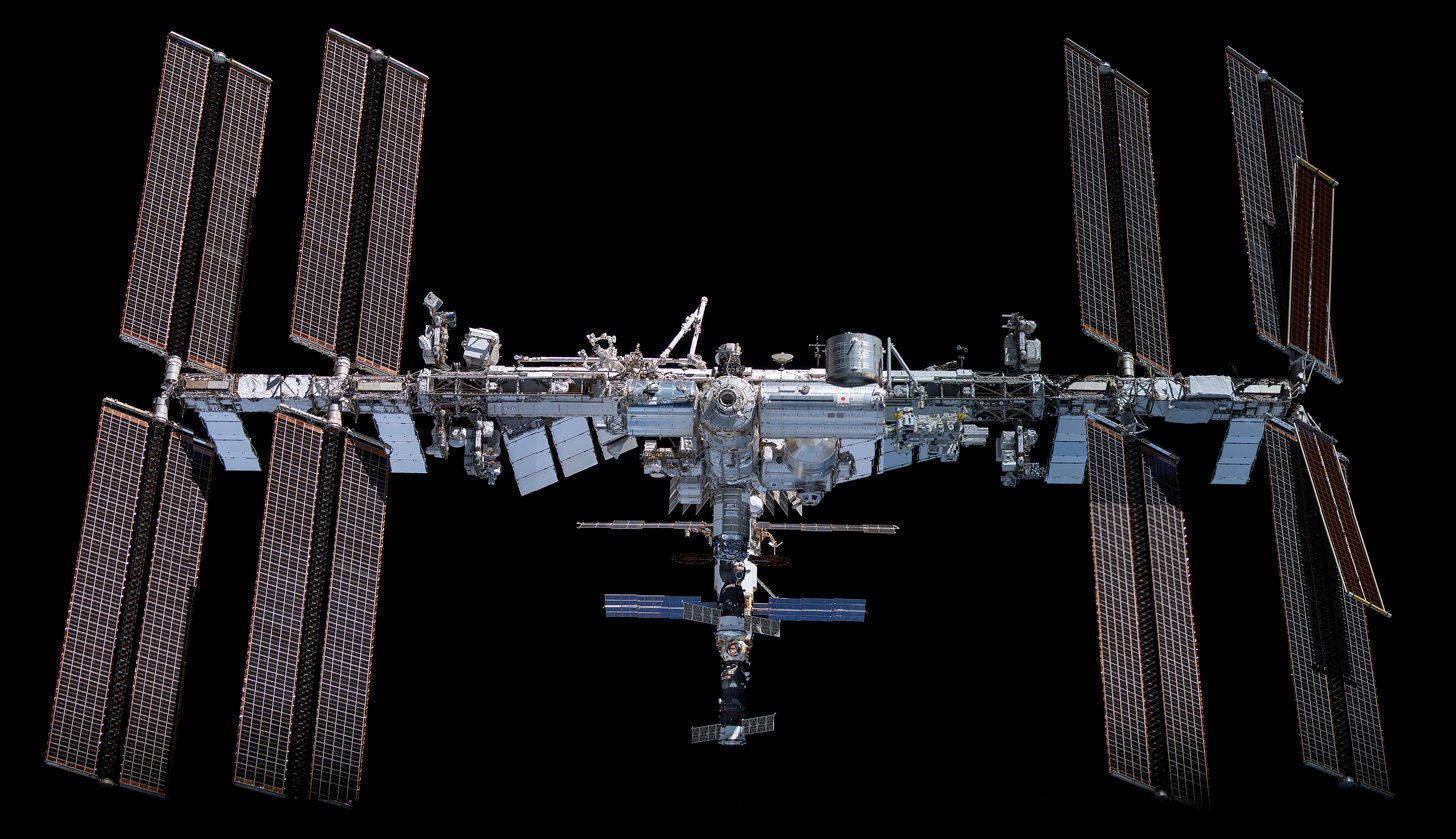
Buellia frigida is one of the few lichens to have been on board the International Space Station.

Buellia frigida is a model organism in astrobiology that provides insight into life's adaptability beyond Earth and the potential for survival in space. Research examines this extremotolerant species' endurance under harsh conditions akin to those in space and Mars. B. frigida resists non-terrestrial abiotic factors, including space exposure, hypervelocity impacts, and Mars-simulated conditions, which helps explain the biological responses to extreme environments.

Tests expose B. frigida to stressors like vacuum, UV radiation, and desiccation to measure its viability and photosynthetic activity. These tests reveal that B. frigida maintains high post-exposure viability and sustains minimal damage to its photosynthetic capacity under these conditions. This resilience stems from protective mechanisms including morphological traits, secondary compounds, and anhydrobiosis during desiccation, features that also enable other extremotolerant lichens to survive.

Space experiments on the International Space Station (ISS) and in simulated Mars conditions tested the lichen's survival. One study showed that exposure to low Earth orbit conditions resulted in reduced viability of its fungal and algal components, but the fungal partner was less affected than the algal partner. Despite this, the lichen maintained its structure, showing resilience to an extraterrestrial environment. This indicated potential adaptation of this terrestrial organism to space conditions.

Different results came from the European Space Agency's Biology and Mars Experiment (BIOMEX) project, also conducted on the ISS. These experiments showed high mortality rates for both algal and fungal symbionts of B. frigida under similar low Earth orbit conditions, suggesting reduced survival potential in extreme extraterrestrial environments, questioning whether Mars could support this lichen. In additional BIOMEX studies, researchers examined the DNA integrity of B. frigida over 1.5 years. They used the Randomly Amplified Polymorphic DNA technique and observed DNA alterations in space-exposed lichen compared to Earth-based controls, indicating limited resistance of Buellia frigida to the conditions of space and Mars-like environments.

== See also ==
- List of Buellia species
