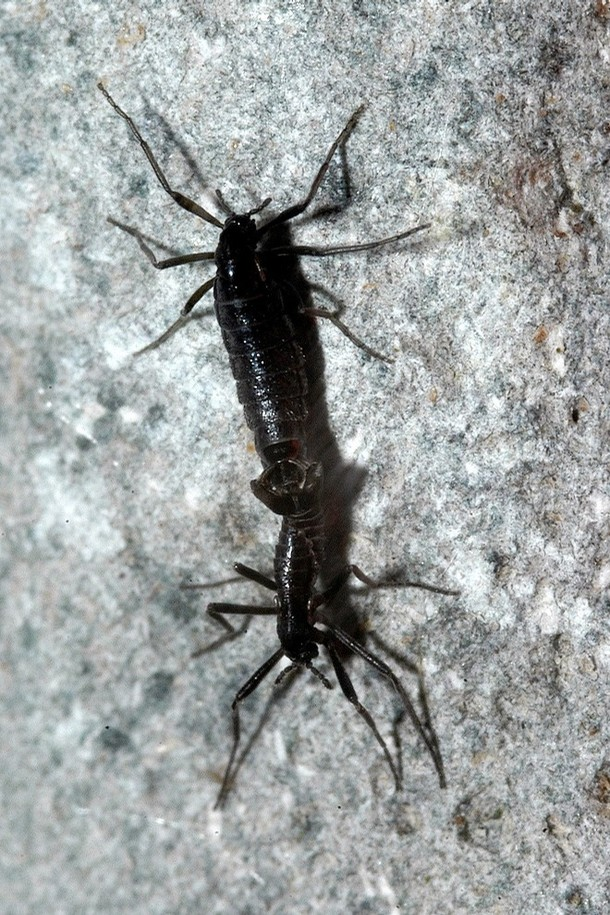
- Two Belgica antarctica adults

Scientific classification
- Kingdom: Animalia
- Phylum: Arthropoda
- Clade: Pancrustacea
- Class: Insecta
- Order: Diptera
- Family: Chironomidae
- Genus: Belgica
- Species: B. antarctica

Binomial name
- Belgica antarctica Jacobs, 1900
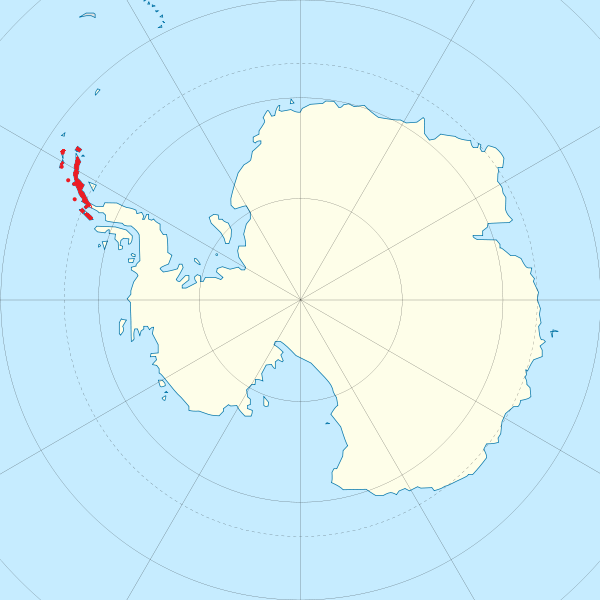
- Distribution in Antarctica (red)

= Belgica antarctica =

Species of fly

Belgica antarctica, the Antarctic midge, is a species of flightless midge, endemic to the continent of Antarctica. At a length of 2–6 mm (0.08–0.2 in), it is the largest purely terrestrial invertebrate native to the continent. It also has the smallest known insect genome as of 2014, with only 99 million base pairs (Mbp) of nucleotides and about 13,500 genes. It is the only insect that can survive year-round in Antarctica.

== Taxonomy and etymology ==
The first specimens of Belgica antarctica were collected on the Belgian Antarctic Expedition (1897–1899). During this expedition organized by the Belgian Government, Romanian biologist Emil Racoviță collected, among other specimens, a flightless midge and its larvae. Based on these specimens, the Belgian doctor and entomologist, Jean-Charles Jacobs, described Belgica antarctica Jacobs, 1900. Jacobs named the new genus and species of insect after the location where it was collected off the Antarctic Peninsula, "canal de la Belgica antarctica" (Belgian Strait) (now called Gerlache Strait), which in turn was named after the expedition's steam-yacht, SY Belgica.

== Tolerance to extreme conditions ==
=== Freezing temperatures ===
The flightlessness of B. antarctica may be an adaptation to prevent wind from blowing it into inhospitable areas. It can survive freezing, but although local air temperatures may reach as low as −40 °C, this insect cannot survive temperatures below −15 °C. This is comparatively milder than other cold-adapted insects. The reason for this relatively low freezing tolerance is due to thermal buffering: just burrowing at a depth of 1 cm, temperature is stable between 0 and −2 °C for 10 months out of 12, and it seldom goes lower than −7 °C all year round. Ice and snow cover also helps keep the temperature stable. Freezing tolerance is enhanced by cold hardening.

To adapt to the cold temperatures, B. antarctica accumulates trehalose, glucose, and erythritol. These compounds help the insect survive freezing by reducing the amount of ice that forms within the body. They also stabilize proteins and membranes, binding to them by means of hydrogen bonds. Heat shock proteins also help the tolerance to both high and low temperatures.

Belgica antarctica not only tolerates, but also requires a freezing climate to survive: exposure of larvae to such mild temperatures as 10 °C is enough to kill them within a week. Exposure to temperatures of 30 °C kills individuals in a few hours. It can, however, resist partial desiccation, surviving the loss of up to 70% of body water. In examples of first instar larvae evolving into fourth instar larvae, the conditions were incredibly limited, only occurring at 4 °C.

=== Dehydration ===
Not only can this insect survive in freezing temperatures, but their larvae are incredibly adapted to dehydration in the west coast of Antarctica. Living without water through the duration of their larval cycle, B. antarctica have been recorded to slow the dehydration process by doubling their concentration of glycerol, which assists in the cold-hardening process as well. Like other insects, B. antarctica larvae have been shown to cluster to preserve water in their populations.

== Lifecycle ==
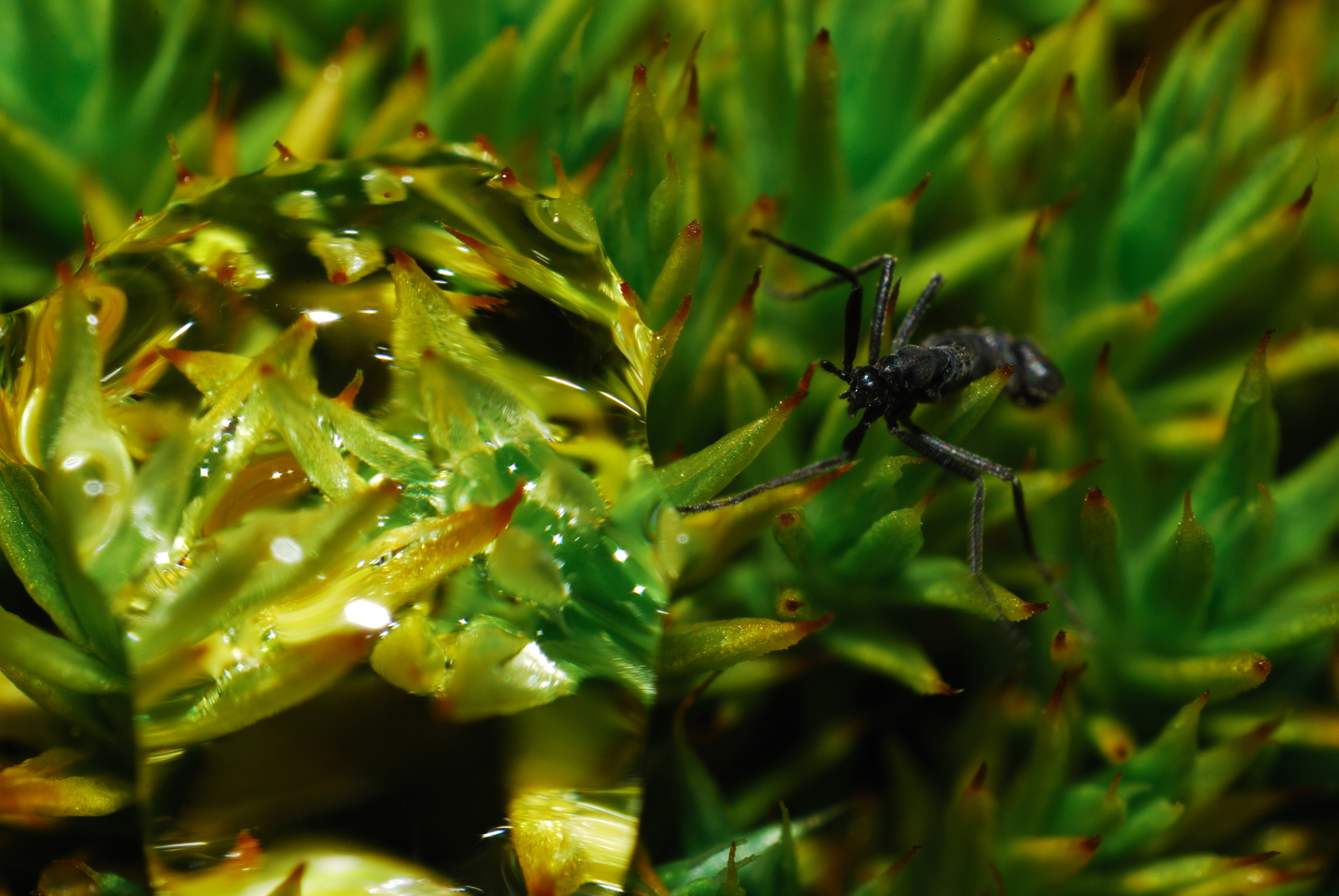
Belgica antarctica on a moss in Antarctica.

B. antarctica spends most of its two-year lifecycle in four larval stages. Research finds that it uses a unique dual dormancy strategy during its development. In the first winter, larvae typically reach their second instar and undergo quiescence — a form of dormancy that allows them to quickly resume development when conditions improve. As they approach their second winter in the fourth (final) instar, the larvae enter obligate diapause, a programmed dormant period that ensures synchronized adult emergence during summer.

Overwintering may occur in any instar. Terrestrial algae (particularly Prasiola crispa), fungi, decaying vegetation, organic detritus, and microorganisms provide the food for the larval stage. The non-feeding adults emerge in the spring and summer and live no more than 10 days; females reproduce only once — they are semelparous, that is — laying their eggs, which damages the abdomen, 1–2 days after mating in their first day of life. The number of egg batches is sometimes said to be singular and, at other times, multiple. The iteroparous males on the other hand, are able to mate more than once. The eggs are laid covered in a hygroscopic gel, secreted by the accessory gland during oviposition, which prevents dehydration and overheating, and acts a food source and thermal buffer. Mating occurs in large groups of males, like swarms of winged midges.

The only other free-living insects known from the Antarctic are the chironomid Parochlus steinenii, the only flighted insect in the Antarctic, from the South Shetlands and South Georgia, and Glaciopsyllus antarcticus, the latter being free-living only at the larval stage, having the most southern record of any insect (68º 51' S), and being the only insect from deep continental Antarctica (East Antarctica).

== Genome ==
As of 2014, B. antarctica has the smallest insect genome known, at 99 Mbp of nucleotides and 13 500 genes. Although the total amount of coding DNA is similar to that of other Diptera (19 Mbp), its fraction is much higher due to the extreme reduction in some types of non-coding DNA. Intron size has been reduced, while transposable elements are almost absent.

Comparison of insect genomes
Species	Genome size	Coding DNA (genome percentage)	Transposable element percentage
Belgica antarctica	99 Mbp	19 Mbp (19.4%)	0.12%
Aedes aegypti	1380 Mbp	22 Mbp (1.6%)	47%
Drosophila melanogaster	180 Mbp	22.8 Mbp (13.6%)	20%

== See also ==
- Gynaephora groenlandica, a species of Arctic moth whose larvae can survive temperatures below −60 °C
- Belgian Antarctic Expedition
