= Jean-Charles Jacobs =

Belgian entomologist (1821–1907)

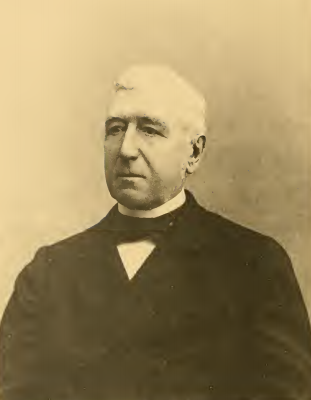
Jean-Charles Jacobs

Jean-Charles Jacobs (1821 – 1907) was a Belgian doctor and entomologist, a pupil of Constantin Wesmael. He graduated in medicine from the University of Brussels, but never abandoned the study of insects, and was one of the founders of the Société entomologique de Belgique. He concentrated on the Hymenoptera, often in collaboration with Jules Tosquinet, turning to Diptera later in life. Among his later studies was a report on the insects collected by the Belgian Antarctic Expedition, including that continent's largest fully terrestrial animal, the fly Belgica antarctica .
