= Desoria klovstadi =

Scientific classification
- Kingdom: Animalia
- Phylum: Arthropoda
- Class: Collembola
- Order: Entomobryomorpha
- Family: Isotomidae
- Genus: Desoria
- Species: D. klovstadi

Binomial name
- Desoria klovstadi Carpenter, 1902

Species of springtail

Desoria klovstadi is a species of springtail native to Antarctica. It was one of the first Antarctic species, from the class of Collembola, to be described.

== Taxonomy ==
Desoria klovstadi was first collected in November 1899 during the British Antarctic Expedition, on the north coast of Victoria Land. The species was first described by Carpenter in 1902, and was one of the first from the class of Collembola described from the continent of Antarctica.

== Distribution and habitat ==
Desoria klovstadi can be found on the coasts of Antarctica and the surrounding Southern Ocean, also known as the Antarctic Ocean. More specifically, they occur in northern Victoria Land, the Possession Islands, the Coulman Islands, and Foyn Islands
