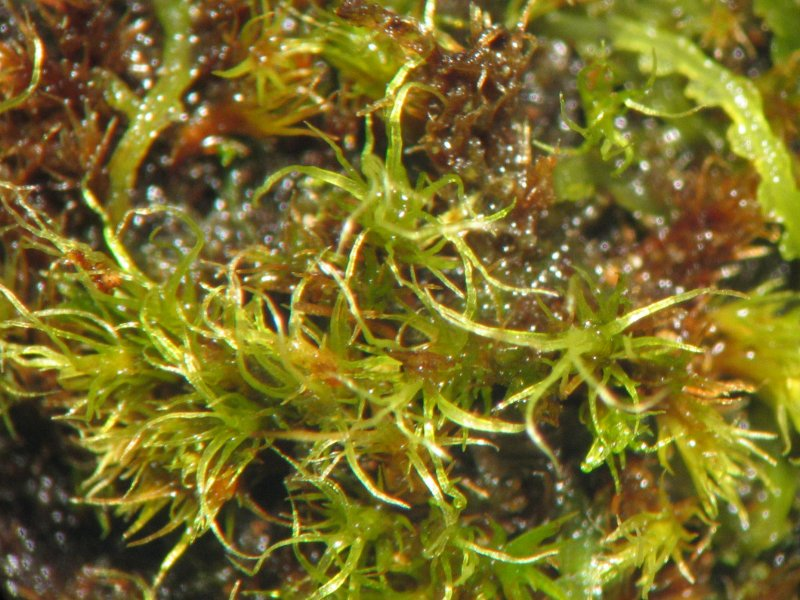

Scientific classification
- Kingdom: Plantae
- Division: Bryophyta
- Class: Bryopsida
- Subclass: Dicranidae
- Order: Dicranales
- Family: Leucobryaceae
- Genus: Campylopus
- Species: C. pyriformis

Binomial name
- Campylopus pyriformis (Schultz) Brid.

= Campylopus pyriformis =

Species of moss

Campylopus pyriformis is a species of moss belonging to the family Dicranaceae. It has a cosmopolitan distribution.
