= Nanorchestes antarcticus =

Scientific classification
- Kingdom: Animalia
- Phylum: Arthropoda
- Subphylum: Chelicerata
- Class: Arachnida
- Family: Nanorchestidae
- Genus: Nanorchestes
- Species: N. antarcticus

Binomial name
- Nanorchestes antarcticus Strandtmann, 1963

Species of mite

Nanorchestes antarcticus is a species of mite in the family Nanorchestidae, first described by Womersley and Strandtmann in 1963. It is widely distributed across continental and maritime Antarctica and parts of the sub-Antarctic region, where it inhabits ice-free terrestrial environments. It is one of the smallest terrestrial mites and is notable for its tolerance of extreme cold.

== Taxonomy ==
Nanorchestes antarcticus was originally described by Womersley and Strandtmann (1963) from specimens collected at Observation Hill, Ross Island, Victoria Land. Subsequent taxonomic revisions revealed that specimens previously identified as N. antarcticus included several distinct species. In 1982, Strandtmann described N. berryi and N. gressitti from maritime Antarctic material and recognised N. lalae and N. bellus as distinct species from specimens previously attributed to N. antarcticus. Additional species have also been described from Macquarie Island and the Ross Sea region.

Molecular studies have identified divergent COI lineages in N. antarcticus, suggesting that its widespread distribution may conceal genetic diversity and potentially unrecognised species.

== Description ==
Nanorchestes antarcticus is a very small terrestrial mite, described as reddish, globular and iridescent, with an average body length of 240 μm for males and 230 μm for females. The dorsal surface bears two pairs of eyes. Diagnostic features include a deeply divided naso, a bifurcated cheliceral seta with two approximately equal branches, and characteristic arrangements of setae on the legs. The first and second pairs of legs also possess distinctive sensory structures on their tarsi. Strandtmann reported females containing fully developed larvae, suggesting that N. antarcticus is larviparous.

Both sexes have eight pairs of genital setae on the genital plates. The number of genital setae varies with the developmental stage, with 6 pairs in tritonymphs, 3 in deutonymphs and 1 in protonymphs; larvae lack this.

== Distribution and habitat ==
Nanorchestes antarcticus is recorded as one of the most abundant terrestrial arthropods in continental Antarctica. The species has been recorded in moss turf and carpet communities, barren scree, glacial deposits and sandy soils, as well as on glaciers. At Signy Island, it has been found from sea level all the way to the island's summit, at approximately 279m elevation.

Populations of N. antarcticus appear to be most abundant in bryophyte habitats, with densities of approximately 1000-1200 individuals/m². Lower densities have been recorded in algae and soil habitats (100-800 individuals/m²) and glacial ice (around 180 individuals/m²).

In one study, mites were active from October to March, when ground temperatures exceeded 0°C, and became immobile in deeper sand layers from April to September. Eggs were recorded as early as November, at depths of up to 4cm. Larvae occur during the austral summer, alongside increased numbers of nymphs.

Its distribution and abundance are associated with environmental conditions including chlorophyll-a content and the presence of macroscopic algae; and negatively with soil salinity. More broadly, they are adapted to environments affected by seasonal snow and ice melt, which can allow them to survive sub-zero soil temperatures.

== Physiology ==
It has adapted to the extreme environmental conditions of Antarctica and exhibits considerable tolerance to temperature extremes. Laboratory studies found that it could survive temperatures between -23°C and 31°C, while temperatures below -41°C and above 37.2°C were lethal under experimental conditions. The species has also been observed to remain locomotively active at temperatures as low as -8°C. Specimens have been recovered from ice on McLeod Glacier and Signy Island, representing remnants of a population that previously inhabited a depression on the glacier surface.

Respiration happens through the cuticle, which bears regularly spaced surface granulations that retain a layer of air around the body. These structures have been proposed to facilitate gas exchange in seasonally waterlogged polar soils and reduce direct contact with ice, thus limiting freezing. Starvation in combination with exposure to low temperatures lowered the mites' mean supercooling point and was associated with increased glycerol concentrations in their body fluids.

Oxygen consumption in N. antarcticus has been measured at 5°C using micro-respirometry. Individual respiration rates varied between developmental stages, ranging from 0.156×10⁻³ μl to 1.135×10⁻³ μl O2 per individual per hour. When adjusted for body mass, metabolic rates were highest in adult females and lowest in deutonymphs.

N. antarcticus has been reported to feed on the gelatinous red-snow alga Ochromonas. When disturbed it can also jump considerable distances relative to its body size; one observed jump measured 8cm.
