= Belgica albipes =

Scientific classification
- Domain: Eukaryota
- Kingdom: Animalia
- Phylum: Arthropoda
- Class: Insecta
- Order: Diptera
- Family: Chironomidae
- Genus: Belgica
- Species: B. albipes

Binomial name
- Belgica albipes Séguy, 1965

Species of fly

Belgica albipes is a species of non-flying lake fly first described by Eugène Séguy in 1965. Belgica albipes is part of the genus Belgica and the family Chironomidae. The insect lives in the Crozet Islands.

== Bibliography ==
- Davies, L. 1973: Observations on the distribution of surface-living land arthropods on the Subantarctic Île de la Possession, Îles Crozet. Journal of natural history, 7: 241–253. doi:10.1080/00222937300770201
- Séguy 1965: Deux nouveaux Tendipedides des Iles Crozet (Insetes Dipteres Nematoceres). Bull. Mus. natn. Hist. nat. Paris, 37: 285–289.
- Serra-Tosio, B. 1982: Description du male de Belgica albipes (SÉGUY, 1965), n. comb., rare chironomidé microptère des iles Crozet (Diptera). Revue française d'entomologie, 4: 97–100.
