= Free-living =

Free-living may refer to:

- a non-parasitic, non-endosymbiotic organism
- a non-sessile (or free-swimming) organism
