= Cryptopygus nivicolus =

Scientific classification
- Domain: Eukaryota
- Kingdom: Animalia
- Phylum: Arthropoda
- Class: Collembola
- Order: Entomobryomorpha
- Family: Isotomidae
- Genus: Cryptopygus
- Species: C. nivicolus

Binomial name
- Cryptopygus nivicolus (Salmon, 1965)

Synonyms
- Neocryptopygus nivicolus Salmon, 1965

Species of springtail

Cryptopygus nivicolus is a species of springtail native to Antarctica. It is found in southern Victoria Land.
