= Gomphiocephalus =

Gomphiocephalus hodgsoni

Scientific classification
- Kingdom: Animalia
- Phylum: Arthropoda
- Clade: Pancrustacea
- Class: Collembola
- Order: Poduromorpha
- Family: Hypogastruridae
- Genus: Gomphiocephalus; Carpenter, 1908
- Species: G. hodgsoni

Binomial name
- Gomphiocephalus hodgsoni Carpenter, 1908

Genus of springtails

Gomphiocephalus is a genus of springtail native to Antarctica. Gomphiocephalus hodgsoni is the only member of the genus.

The Gomphiocephalus hodgsoni was first collected from Granite Harbour, southern Victoria Land, Eastern Antarctica in 1902 by the British National Antarctic Expedition.
