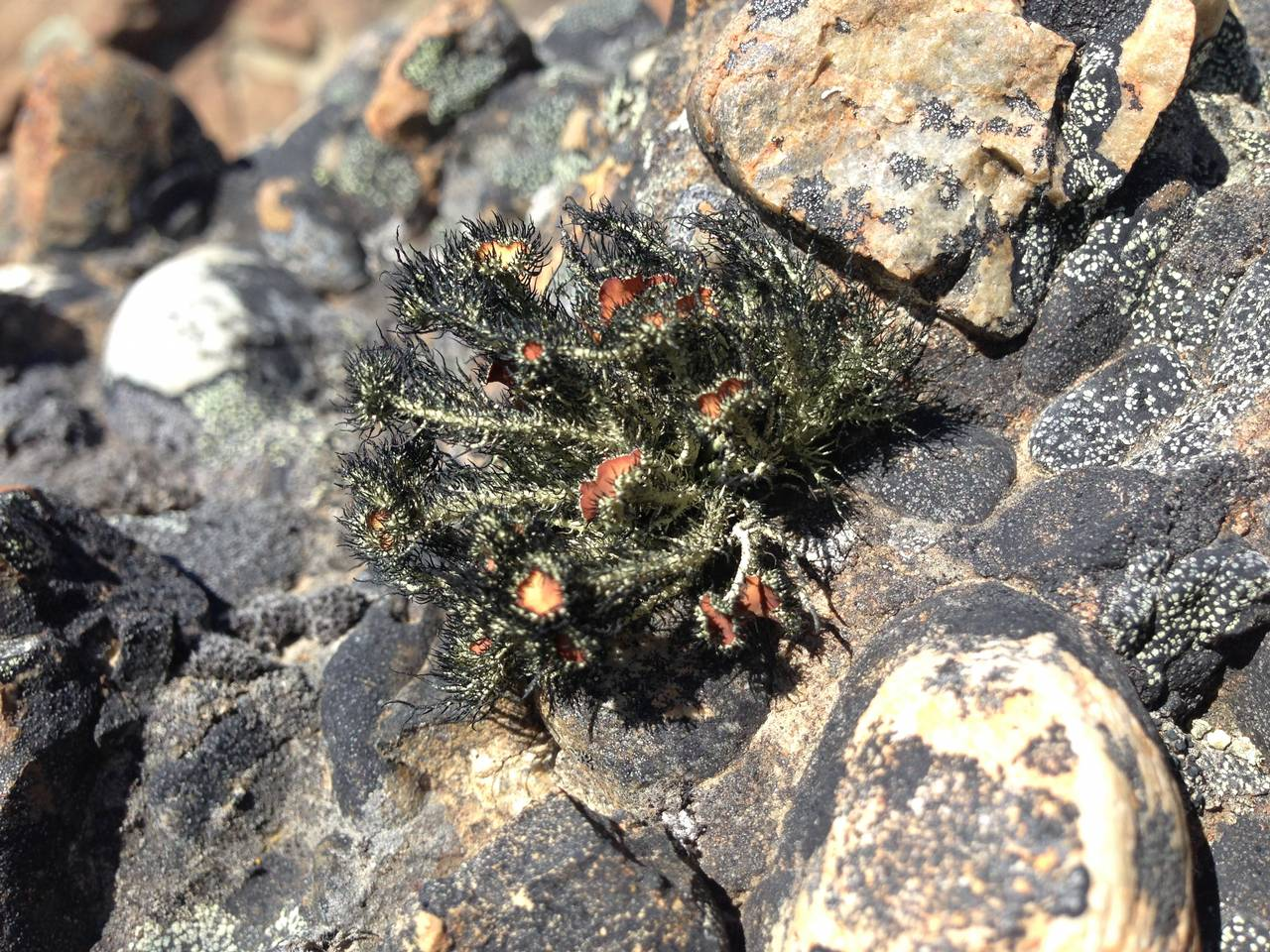

Conservation status
- Apparently Secure (NatureServe)

Scientific classification
- Kingdom: Fungi
- Division: Ascomycota
- Class: Lecanoromycetes
- Order: Lecanorales
- Family: Parmeliaceae
- Genus: Usnea
- Species: U. sphacelata

Binomial name
- Usnea sphacelata R.Br. (1823)

Synonyms
- Usnea melaxantha var. sphacelata (R.Br.) Hook.f. & Taylor (1847); Usnea sulphurea var. sphacelata (R.Br.) Vain. (1903); Neuropogon sphacelatus (R.Br.) D.J.Galloway (1992)

= Usnea sphacelata =

Species of lichen

Usnea sphacelata is a species of saxicolous (rock-dwelling), fruticose lichen in the large family Parmeliaceae. It is found in both polar regions of Earth, as well as in southern and northern South America and in New Zealand.

== Taxonomy ==
The lichen was formally described as a new species in 1823 by Scottish botanist Robert Brown. The type specimen was collected from Melville Island in the Canadian Arctic Archipelago.

A 2007 study using phylogenetic and morphological analysis of a large number of Antarctic Usnea specimens suggests that Usnea sphacelata comprises at least two genetically distinct groups with no clear differences in morphology.

== Description ==
Usnea sphacelata has a range of distinctive morphological characteristics. Its central axis is relatively thin, accounting for about 20–40% of its structure. Soralia, which are numerous, are typically restricted to the ultimate branches. Minute papillae, which are often pigmented, can be observed on its surface. Fibrils are usually absent from this species. Additionally, its pigmentation is noteworthy; the upper portion is conspicuously variegated, or it can be continuously pigmented towards the tips. This set of features helps to distinguish Usnea sphacelata from other sympatric Antarctic Usnea species, including U. antarctica, U. aurantiaco-atra, U. subantarctica, and U. trachycarpa.

== Distribution and habitat ==
The lichen has a bipolar distribution; that is, it occurs in both the Antarctic and the Arctic. It is also found in southern South America, the northern Andean regions of South America, and the South Island of New Zealand. In the Windmill Islands area of continental Antarctica, Usnea sphacelata tends to grow in drier sun-exposed areas where snow does not tend to persist. Typical lichen associates at this location include Buellia frigida, Buellia soredians, Pseudephebe minuscula, and Umbilicaria decussata. In some regions, the crustose Buellia frigida is often the only species that can become established on smooth, ice-polished rock. Once its thallus is about 2 cm or more in diameter, Pseudephebe minuscula or Usnea sphacelata often start growing near the centre of the thallus.

== Ecology ==
A 1989 study near Casey Station, Antarctica found that U. sphacelata showed potential for photosynthetic activity even under challenging environmental conditions. The research demonstrated that while humidity levels above 80% were optimal for photosynthesis, the lichen could maintain positive net photosynthesis across various exposures on Antarctic rocks, with its biomass reaching up to 900 grams dry weight per square metre in suitable habitats.

Other research conducted near Casey Station revealed that U. sphacelata exists in two forms: a blackish pigmented light-form found in exposed sites and a yellowish shade-form in sheltered habitats. The species can photosynthesise while covered in snow, even at temperatures below freezing, though its productivity is limited by several factors. The lichen shows signs of photoinhibition (decreased photosynthetic rate) when exposed to light levels above 600 μmol m⁻² s⁻¹ PAR, particularly at lower temperatures, suggesting that it photosynthesises most efficiently during overcast conditions. During the studied austral summer period, the lichen was only physiologically active for about 27% of the time, primarily when moistened by snow, producing approximately 3.44 g carbon per square meter. This productivity is significantly lower than laboratory studies had suggested, highlighting the challenges of survival in the Antarctic environment.

== See also ==
- List of Usnea species
