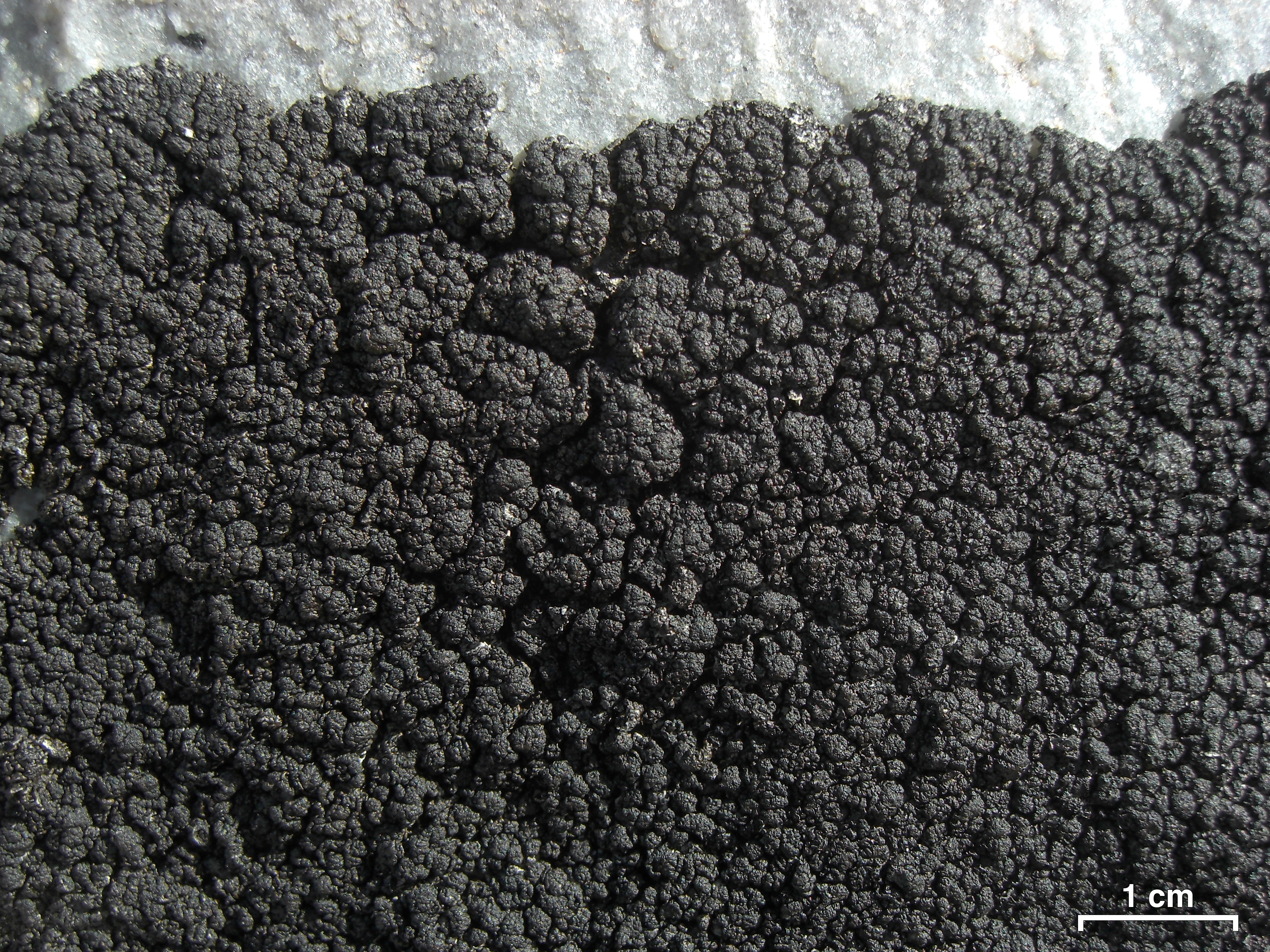

Conservation status
- Secure (NatureServe)

Scientific classification
- Kingdom: Fungi
- Division: Ascomycota
- Class: Lecanoromycetes
- Order: Lecanorales
- Family: Parmeliaceae
- Genus: Pseudephebe
- Species: P. minuscula

Binomial name
- Pseudephebe minuscula (Nyl. ex Arnold) Brodo & D.Hawksw. (1977)

Synonyms
- Imbricaria lanata var. minuscula Nyl. ex Arnold (1878); Alectoria lanata f. minuscula Nyl. ex Leight. (1878); Alectoria minuscula Nyl. (1871); Alectoria minuscula (Nyl. ex Arnold) Degel. (1938); Cornicularia lanata var. minuscula (Nyl. ex Arnold) Hue (1915); Parmelia minuscula (Nyl. ex Arnold) Nyl. (1887); Parmelia pubescens var. minuscula (Nyl.) Dalla Torre & Sarnth. (1902)

= Pseudephebe minuscula =

Species of lichen

Pseudephebe minuscula is a species of fruticose lichen in the family Parmeliaceae. In North America, it is known colloquially as coarse rockwool. It has an antitropical distribution.

== Description ==
The lichen has a dark brown to almost black filamentous thallus, comprising individual cylindrical branches, closely attached to the rock substrate, often flattened, measuring 0.2–0.5 mm thick. It is common in windswept arctic and alpine environments, where it grows on granitic rocks and pebbles.
