= List of fungi of South Africa – U =

This is an alphabetical list of the fungal taxa as recorded from South Africa. Currently accepted names have been appended.

== Um ==
Genus: Umbilicaria (Lichens)

- Umbilicaria flavovirescens Leight.
- Umbilicaria galuca Stizenb.
- Umbilicaria hottentotta Fee.
- Umbilicaria lecanorocarpa Krempelh.
- Umbilicaria membranacea Laur.
- Umbilicaria papulosa Nyl.
- Umbilicaria pustulata Hoffm. f. minor Cromb.
- Umbilicaria pustulata var. papillata Hampe.
- Umbilicaria pustulata var. papulosa Tuck.
- Umbilicaria rubiginosa Pers.
- Umbilicaria thunbergii Reinke

== Un ==
Genus: Uncinula

- Uncinula aspera Doidge
- Uncinula circinata Cooke & Peck.
- Uncinula combreticola Doidge
- Uncinula eylesii Doidge
- Uncinula incrassata Salm
- Uncinula necator Burr.
- Uncinula pterocarpi Doidge
- Uncinula polvchaeta Berk. & Curt, ex Ellis.
- Uncinula sp.

== Ur ==
Genus: Urceolaria

- Urceolaria actinostoma Pers. ex Ach.
- Urceolaria actinostoma var. aenea Müll.Arg.
- Urceolaria actinostoma var. caesiopluinbea Nyl
- Urceolaria capitata Nees.
- Urceolaria cinerea Ach.
- Urceolaria cinereocaesia Ach.
- Urceolaria deuteria Syd.
- Urceolaria excavata Ach.
- Urceolaria scruposa β arenaria Schaer.
- Urceolaria scruposa f. arenaria Ach.
- Urceolaria subcuprea Nyl.

Order: Uredinales

Genus: Uredinopsis

- Uredinopsis macrosperma P.Magn.

Genus: Uredo

- Uredo africana Lagerh.
- Uredo aloes Cooke.
- Uredo alysicarpi Doidge.
- Uredo ancylanthi P.Henn.
- Uredo asclepiadis-fruticosi Doidge.
- Uredo aterrima Thuem.
- Uredo augeae Pole Evans.
- Uredo augeae Syd.
- Uredo balsamodendri Cooke.
- Uredo brachylaenae Doidge.
- Uredo brideliae Doidge.
- Uredo caricis-petitianae Doidge.
- Uredo carpodini P.Henn.
- Uredo cassiae-mimosoides Doidge.
- Uredo celastrineae Cooke & Mass.
- Uredo cephalandrae Thuem.
- Uredo clematidis Berk.
- Uredo combreticola Doidge.
- Uredo commelinae Kalchbr.
- Uredo compositarum var. melantherae Cooke.
- Uredo crotalariicola P.Henn.
- Uredo cryptolepidis Cooke.
- Uredo cussoniae Cooke.
- Uredo cypericola P.Henn.
- Uredo detergibilis P.Henn.
- Uredo digitariaecola Thuem.
- Uredo disae v.d.Byl
- Uredo dissotidis Cooke.
- Uredo dissolidis-longicaudae P.Henn.
- Uredo dolichospora Kalchbr.
- Uredo dombeyae Doidge.
- Uredo ectadiopsis Cooke.
- Uredo ecteinanthi Kalchbr.
- Uredo ehrartae-calycinae Doidge.
- Uredo eriospermi MacOwan.
- Uredo fici Cast.
- Uredo filicum Klotzsch.
- Uredo fuirenae P.Henn.
- Uredo gardeniae-thunbergiae P. Henn.
- Uredo geranii DC., (1806) f. pelargonii-alchemilloides Thuem. accepted as Puccinia pelargonii-zonalis Doidge (1926)
- Uredo geranii f. pelargonii-zonalis Thuem. accepted as Puccinia pelargonii-zonalis Doidge (1926)
- Uredo gliae Lindr.
- Uredo grewiae Pat. & Har.
- Uredo harmsiana P.Henn.
- Uredo heteromorphae MacOwan.
- Uredo homeriae Bubak.
- Uredo hyperici-leucoptychodis Doidge.
- Uredo hypoestis de Toni
- Uredo indigoferae Doidge.
- Uredo ixiae Lev.
- Uredo ixiae Rud.
- Uredo kaempferiae Syd.
- Uredo kampuluvensis P.Henn.
- Uredo leguminosarum Link.
- Uredo lepisclinis Thuem.
- Uredo leucadis Syd.
- Uredo linearis Pers.
- Uredo lonchocarpi Doidge.
- Uredo longaenis P.Henn.
- Uredo lotononi Doidge.
- Uredo lucida Theum.
- Uredo lupini Berk. & Curt.
- Uredo macrosperum Cooke.
- Uredo mixta Duby f. Salicis capensis Thuem.
- Uredo monsoniae Syd.
- Uredo moraeae Kalchbr.
- Uredo myrsiphylli Thuem.
- Uredo pelargonii Thuem.
- Uredo phaseolorum de Bary.
- Uredo pilulaeformis Berk.
- Uredo plectranthi Kalchbr.
- Uredo pogonarthriae Syd.
- Uredo polygalae Kalchbr.
- Uredo polypodii DC.
- Uredo pretoriensis Syd.
- Uredo psoraleae-polystictae Doidge.
- Uredo pychnostachydis Kalchbr.
- Uredo rhoina Syd.
- Uredo rhynchosiae Cooke.
- Uredo ricini Biv. Bern.
- Uredo rottboelliae Diet.
- Uredo rabigo-vera DC. f. digitariae-sanguinalis Thuem.
- Uredo rumicum DC.
- Uredo rumicum f. Rumicis obtusifolii capensis Thuem.
- Uredo satyrii Mass.
- Uredo schizachyrii Doidge.
- Uredo scholzii P.Henn.
- Uredo scirpi-corymbosi Doidge.
- Uredo scirpi-maritimi Doidge.
- Uredo sempertecta Thuem.
- Uredo stenotaphri Syd.
- Uredo stylosanthis P.Henn.
- Uredo transversalis Thuem.
- Uredo valerianae DC. f. valerianae-capensis Thuem.
- Uredo vangueriae Cooke.
- Uredo viborgiae P.Henn.
- Uredo zehneriae Thuem.
- Uredo sp.

Genus: Urocystis

- Urocystis agropyri Schroet.
- Urocystis gladioli Wemh.
- Urocystis hypoxidis Thaxt.
- Urocystis occulta Rabenh.
- Urocystis ornithoglossi Zundel.
- Urocystis tritici Körn., (1877), accepted as Urocystis agropyri (Preuss) A.A. Fisch. Waldh., (1867)

Genus: Uromyces

- Uromyces albucae Kalchbr. & Cooke.
- Uromyces alchemillae Lev.
- Uromyces aloes P.Magn.
- Uromyces aloicola P.Henn.
- Uromyces alysicarpi Wakef. & Hansf.
- Uromyces anomathecae Cooke.
- Uromyces antholyzae Syd.
- Uromyces appendiculatus Link.
- Uromyces argyrolobii Doidge.
- Uromyces avicularae Schroet.
- Uromyces babianae Doidge.
- Uromyces badius Syd.
- Uromyces barbeyanus P.Henn.
- Uromyces betae Lev. accepted as Uromyces beticola (Bellynck) Boerema (1987)
- Uromyces bidentis Lagerh.
- Uromyces bolusii Mass.
- Uromyces bona-spei Bubak.
- Uromyces bulbinis Theum.
- Uromyces bylianus Doidge
- Uromyces capensis Doidge
- Uromyces caryophyllinus Wint. (sic) possibly (Schrank) J. Schröt., (1884) accepted as Uromyces dianthi (Pers.) Niessl, (1872)
- Uromyces cassiae-mimosoides Doidge
- Uromyces chloridis Doidge
- Uromyces circinalis Kalchbr. & Cooke
- Uromyces clignyi Pat. & Har.
- Uromyces cluytiae Kalchbr. & Cooke
- Uromyces commelinae Cooke
- Uromyces comptus Syd.
- Uromyces cyperi P.Henn.
- Uromyces delagoensis Bubak.
- Uromyces dieramatis Doidge
- Uromyces dolichi Cooke
- Uromyces dolichi Syd.
- Uromyces dolicholi Arth.
- Uromyces drimiopsidis Doidge
- Uromyces ecklonii Bubak.
- Uromyces ehrhartae-giganteae Doidge
- Uromyces eragrostidis Tracy.
- Uromyces eriospermi Kalchbr. & Cooke
- Uromyces ermelensis Doidge
- Uromyces erythronii Pass.
- Uromyces erythronii Pass. v. drimiopsidis
- Uromyces euphorbias Cooke & Peck.
- Uromyces euphorbiicola Tranzsch.
- Uromyces fabae (Pers.) de Bary, (1879), accepted as Uromyces viciae-fabae var. viciae-fabae (Pers.) J. Schröt., (1875)
- Uromyces ferrariae Doidge
- Uromyces fiorianus Sacc.
- Uromyces freesiae Bubak.
- Uromyces geissorhizae P.Henn.
- Uromyces geranii (DC.) G.H. Otth & Wartm., (1847), accepted as Puccinia pelargonii-zonalis Doidge (1926)
- Uromyces gladioli P.Henn.
- Uromyces greenstockii Doidge
- Uromyces harmsianus Doidge
- Uromyces heteromorphae Thuem.
- Uromyces hobsoni Vize.
- Uromyces holubii Doidge
- Uromyces hyperici-frondosi Arth.
- Uromyces hypoxidis Cooke
- Uromyces inaequialtus Lasch.
- Uromyces ipomoeae Berk.
- Uromyces ixiae Wint.
- Uromyces junci (Schwein.) Tul. & C.Tul (1854), accepted as Stegocintractia junci (Schwein.) M.Piepenbr. (2000)
- Uromyces kentaniensis Doidge
- Uromyces krantzbergensis Doidge
- Uromyces lachenaliae Doidge
- Uromyces leptodermus Syd.
- Uromyces liliacearum Ung.
- Uromyces limonii Lev.
- Uromyces lugubris Kalchbr.
- Uromyces macowani Bubak.
- Uromyces maireanus Syd.
- Uromyces massoniae Doidge
- Uromyces medicaginis Pass., (1872), accepted as Uromyces striatus J. Schröt., 1870
- Uromyces melantherae Cooke
- Uromyces melasphaerulae Syd.
- Uromyces microsorus Kalchbr. & Cooke
- Uromyces mimusopsidis Cooke
- Uromyces moraeae Syd.
- Uromyces mucunae Rabenh.
- Uromyces natalensis P.Magn.
- Uromyces oxalidis Lév.
- Uromyces papillatus Kalchbr. & Cooke
- Uromyces paradoxus Syd.
- Uromyces pedicellata Pole Evans.
- Uromyces peglerae Pole Evans.
- Uromyces phaseolorum DC.
- Uromyces polemanniae Kalchbr. & Cooke
- Uromyces polygoni Fuck.
- Uromyces pretoriensis Doidge
- Uromyces proeminens Lev.
- Uromyces prunorum Link. var. amygdali Kalchbr.
- Uromyces pseudarthriae Cooke
- Uromyces psoraleae Peck.
- Uromyces pulvinatus Kalchbr. & Cooke
- Uromyces rhodesicus Wakef.
- Uromyces rhynchosiae Cooke emend. Doidge
- Uromyces ricini Biv.
- Uromyces romouleae v.d.Byl & Werd.
- Uromyces romuleae Doidge
- Uromyces rumicis Wint.
- Uromyces saginatus Syd.
- Uromyces sanguinalis Evans.
- Uromyces schinzianus P.Henn.
- Uromyces scillarum Wint.
- Uromyces scrophulariae DC.
- Uromyces setariae-italicae Yoshino.
- Uromyces sparaxidis Syd.
- Uromyces stellenbossiensis v.d.Byl.
- Uromyces strauchii Doidge
- Uromyces striatus J. Schröt., (1870),
- Uromyces stylochitonis Doidge
- Uromyces tenuicutis McAlp.
- Uromyces thwaitesii Berk. & Br.
- Uromyces transversalis Wint.
- Uromyces trichoneurae Doidge
- Uromyces trifolii Lev.
- Uromyces trollipi Kalchbr. & MacOwan.
- Uromyces urgines Kalchbr.
- Uromyces valerianae Fuck.
- Uromyces ventosa Syd.
- Uromyces vignae Barcl.
- Uromyces walsoniae Syd.
- Uromyces zeyheri Bubak.

Genus: Uropyxis

- Uropyxis gerstneri Doidge
- Uropyxis steudneri P.Magn. var. rhodesica Doidge

== Us ==
Genus: Usnea (Lichens)

- Usnea acanthera Vain.
- Usnea aequatoriana Motyka.
- Usnea africana Motyka.
- Usnea amplissima Stirt.
- Usnea angulata Ach.
- Usnea angulata f. gonioides Hue.
- Usnea angulata var. flaccida Müll.Arg.
- Usnea arthroclada Fee subsp. arthrodadodes Vain.
- Usnea articulata Hoffm.
- Usnea articulata f. minor Krempelh.
- Usnea australis Fr.
- Usnea baileyi Zahlbr.
- Usnea barbata Fr.
- Usnea barbata f. ceratina Ach.
- Usnea barbata f. florida Fr.
- Usnea barbata var. articulata Ach.
- Usnea barbata var. australis Müll.Arg.
- Usnea barbata var. farinosa Müll.Arg.
- Usnea barbata var. florida f. australis Vain.
- Usnea barbata* Usnea florida var. comosa Wain.
- Usnea barbata var. scabrosa Müll.Arg.
- Usnea capensis Hoffm.
- Usnea capensis Motyka.
- Usnea cartiliginea Laur.
- Usnea ceratina Ach.
- Usnea ceratina var. picta Steiner.
- Usnea ceratina var. scabrosa Aoh.
- Usnea comosa Rohl.
- Usnea contorta Jatta.
- Usnea comuta Korb.
- Usnea dasypoga Rohl.
- Usnea dasypoga var. plicata Crorab.
- Usnea dasypoga var. plicata f. annulata Hue.
- Usnea dasypoga var. plicata f. dasypogoides Hue.
- Usnea dasypogoides Nyl.
- Usnea delicata Vain.
- Usnea densirostra Tayl.
- Usnea diffracta Vain.
- Usnea distensa Stirt.
- Usnea farinosa Zahlbr.
- Usnea flaccida Motyka.
- Usnea flexilis Stirt.
- Usnea florida Wigg.
- Usnea florida var. asperrima Müll.Arg.
- Usnea florida var australis Sitzenb.
- Usnea florida var. comosa Biroli.
- Usnea florida var. densirostra Stizenb.
- Usnea florida var. farinosa Stizenb.
- Usnea florida var. ochrophora.
- Usnea florida var. pulverulenta Müll.Arg.
- Usnea florida var. rubiginea Michx.
- Usnea florida var. scabrosa Wain.
- Usnea florida var. strigosa Ach.
- Usnea florida var. subelegans Vain.
- Usnea flotowii Zahlbr. var. subhispida Zahlbr.
- Usnea foveolata Stirt.
- Usnea fusca Motyka.
- Usnea gonioides Stirt.
- Usnea gracilis var. subplicata Vain.
- Usnea havaasii Motyka.
- Usnea hirta Wigg.
- Usnea hirta var. horridula Stizenb.
- Usnea hispidula Zahlbr.
- Usnea horridula Motyka.
- Usnea implioita Zahlbr.
- Usnea intercalaris Krempelh.
- Usnea laevis Nyl.
- Usnea leprosa Motyka.
- Usnea longissima Ach.
- Usnea longissima var. horridula Müll.Arg.
- Usnea maculata Stirt.
- Usnea malacea Zahlbr. var. subelegans Zahlbr.
- Usnea molliuscula Stirt.
- Usnea moniliformis Motyka.
- Usnea mutabilis Stirt.
- Usnea ochrophora Motyka.
- Usnea perspinosa Motyka.
- Usnea picata Motyka.
- Usnea plicata Wigg.
- Usnea poliotrix Krempelh.
- Usnea praelonga Stirt.
- Usnea primitiva Motyka.
- Usnea promontorii Motyka.
- Usnea pulverulenta Motyka.
- Usnea pulvinata fr.
- Usnea rubescens Stirt. var. rubrotincta Motyka
- Usnea rubicunda Stirt.
- Usnea rubiginea Massal.
- Usnea rubrotincta Stirt.
- Usnea sorediosula Motyka.
- Usnea spilota Stirt.
- Usnea steineri Zahlbr.
- Usnea steineri var. tincta f. sorediosa Zahlbr.
- Usnea strigosa Eaton.
- Usnea strigosella Steiner.
- Usnea sublurida Stirt.
- Usnea submusciformis Vain.
- Usnea sulcata Motyka.
- Usnea transvaalensis Vain.
- Usnea trichina Motyka.
- Usnea trichodea Ach.
- Usnea trichodeoides Vain, emend. Motyka
- Usnea undulata Stirt.
- Usnea sp.

Family: Usneaceae

Family: Ustilaginaceae

Order: Ustilaginales

Genus: Ustilaginoidea

- Ustilaginoidea mossambicensis P.Henn.
- Ustilaginoidea setariae Bref.

Genus: Ustilago

- Ustilago affinis Ell. & Everh.
- Ustilago andropogonis-finitimi Maubl.
- Ustilago anthephorae Syd.
- Ustilago avenae Jens. (sic), possibly (Pers.) Rostr., (1890)
- Ustilago bromivora Fisch.
- Ustilago capensis Reess.
- Ustilago carbo Tul. f. Cynodontis dactylonis Thuem.
- Ustilago cesatii Fisch. de Waldh.
- Ustilago crameri Korn.
- Ustilago crus-galli Tracy & Earle.
- Ustilago cynodontis P.Henn.
- Ustilago dactyloctaenii P.Henn.
- Ustilago danthoniae Kalchbr.
- Ustilago digitariae Rabenh.
- Ustilago dinteri Syd.
- Ustilago dregeana Tul.
- Ustilago ehrhartana Zundel.
- Ustilago elionuri P.Henn. & Evans.
- Ustilago eragostidis-japonicana Zundel.
- Ustilago evansii P.Henn.
- Ustilago fingerhuthiae Syd.
- Ustilago flagellata Syd.
- Ustilago gigaspora Mass.
- Ustilago henningsii Sacc. & Syd.
- Ustilago heterospora P. Henn.
- Ustilago holubii Syd.
- Ustilago hordei (Pers.) Lagerh. (1889)
- Ustilago hyparrheniae Hopkins.
- Ustilago inconspicua Pole Evans.
- Ustilago ischaemi Fuck.
- Ustilago jensenii Rostr. accepted as Ustilago avenae (Pers.) Rostr., (1890)
- Ustilago kelleri Wille.
- Ustilago levis (Kellerm. & Swingle) Magnus (1896), accepted as Ustilago hordei (Pers.) Lagerh., (1889)
- Ustilago liebenbergii Zundel.
- Ustilago mariscana Zundel.
- Ustilago maydis Tul. (sic) possibly Ustilago maydis (DC.) Corda, (1842)
- Ustilago modesta Syd.
- Ustilago neglecta Niessl.
- Ustilago nuda (C.N. Jensen) Kellerm. & Swingle (1890)
- Ustilago pappophori Syd.
- Ustilago peglerae Bubak & Syd.
- Ustilago piluliformis Tul.
- Ustilago pretoriense Pole Evans.
- Ustilago puellaris Syd.
- Ustilago rabenhorstiana Kuhn.
- Ustilago sacchari Rabenh.
- Ustilago schlechteri P.Henn.
- Ustilago scitaminea Syd., (1924), accepted as Sporisorium scitamineum (Syd.) M. Piepenbr., M. Stoll & Oberw. 2002
- Ustilago scitaminea var. sacchari—barberi.
- Ustilago segetum (Bull.?) Dittm. (sic) (species complex?)
- Ustilago sladenii Pole Evans.
- Ustilago sorghi Pass. accepted as Sporisorium sorghi Ehrenb. ex Link (1825)
- Ustilago stenotaphri P.Henn.
- Ustilago stenotaphricola
- Ustilago trachypogonis Zundel.
- Ustilago tragana Zundel.
- Ustilago trichoneurana Zundel.
- Ustilago trichophora Kunze.
- Ustilago tritici Rostr.
- Ustilago urochloana Zundel.
- Ustilago verruculosa Wakef.
- Ustilago vaillantii Tul.
- Ustilago verecunda Syd.
- Ustilago versatilis Syd.
- Ustilago welwitschiae Bres.
- Ustilago zeae Unger.
- Ustilago sp.

Genus: Ustulina

- Ustulina vulgaris Tul.

== See also ==
- List of bacteria of South Africa
- List of Oomycetes of South Africa
- List of slime moulds of South Africa
- List of fungi of South Africa
  - List of fungi of South Africa – A
  - List of fungi of South Africa – B
  - List of fungi of South Africa – C
  - List of fungi of South Africa – D
  - List of fungi of South Africa – E
  - List of fungi of South Africa – F
  - List of fungi of South Africa – G
  - List of fungi of South Africa – H
  - List of fungi of South Africa – I
  - List of fungi of South Africa – J
  - List of fungi of South Africa – K
  - List of fungi of South Africa – L
  - List of fungi of South Africa – M
  - List of fungi of South Africa – N
  - List of fungi of South Africa – O
  - List of fungi of South Africa – P
  - List of fungi of South Africa – Q
  - List of fungi of South Africa – R
  - List of fungi of South Africa – S
  - List of fungi of South Africa – T
  - List of fungi of South Africa – U
  - List of fungi of South Africa – V
  - List of fungi of South Africa – W
  - List of fungi of South Africa – X
  - List of fungi of South Africa – Y
  - List of fungi of South Africa – Z
