= Agriculture in New York =

Major component of New York's economy

Agriculture is a major component of the New York economy. As of the 2012 census of agriculture, there were over 35,000 farms covering an area of 7 million acres (28,000 km^{2}) which contributed $5.4 billion in gross sales value and $1.2 billion in net farm income to the national economy. Dairy farming alone accounted for $2.5 billion or 45% of sales. The Finger Lakes region is the center of state agriculture, and the state is a top-ten national producer of cow milk, apples, grapes, onions, sweet corn, tomatoes, and maple syrup. New York places second in apple production after Washington.

== History ==
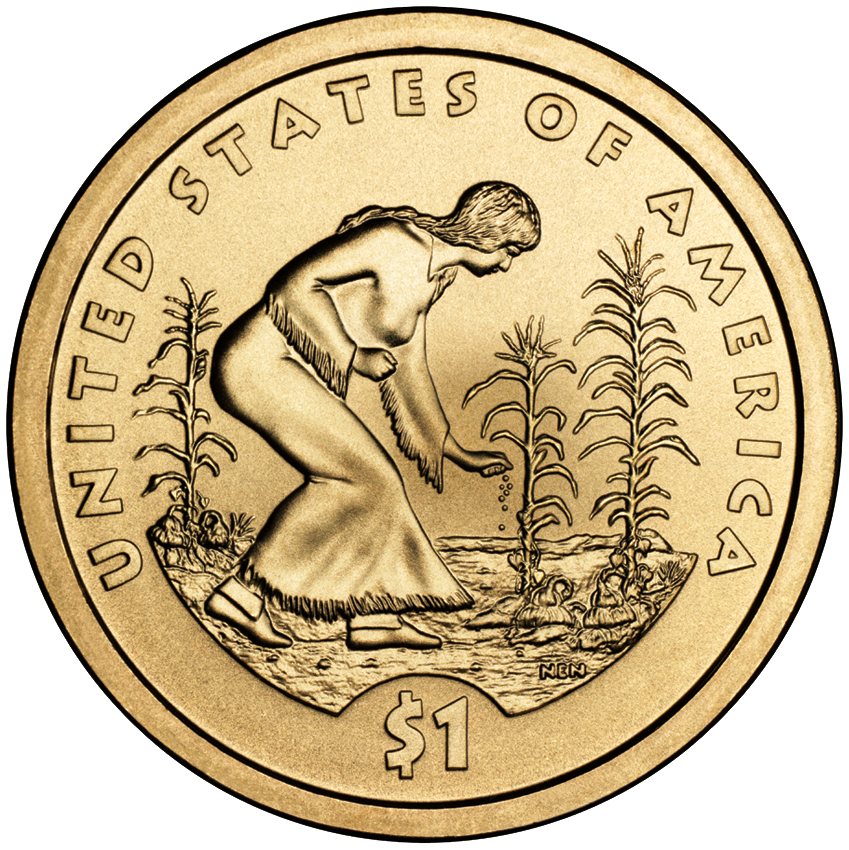
The Three Sisters planting method is featured on the reverse of the 2009 Sacagawea dollar

The majority of the New York soils were formed from glacial till and outwash deposits. Haudenosaunee agriculture from the 1300s onwards centered on the "Three Sisters"—beans, corn, and squash. Extensive apple and peach orchards were planted by the Seneca; these were largely destroyed or taken over by colonists following the revolutionary war.

By the 1840s and 1850s, the New York and Erie Rail Road was shipping fresh milk from the Hudson Valley to New York City, helping alleviate the city's scourge of swill milk, and New York state became the largest national dairy producer when dairy farming was becoming increasingly professional and industrialized. Dairy producers have historically been widely distributed, weakening their bargaining power, and beginning in the 1870s became increasingly dominated by dealers. After an 1883 milk strike, dealers became increasingly consolidated, and after a failed milk strike in 1902, producer cooperatives became increasing consolidated; the 1907 Dairymen's League formed an alliance with the Borden Condensed Milk Company in 1922, who along with Sheffield Farms would become the "Big 3". The interwar period saw the establishment then disestablishment of the state Milk Control Board, producers' bargaining agencies and dealers' bargaining agencies, and the establishment (still in use) of the New York–New Jersey federal–state milk marketing order and the system of milk pooling, classification and blended pricing.

== Major agricultural products ==
Of the $5.4 billion in sales value reported the 2012 census of agriculture, 58% was from the value of livestock, poultry, and their products, and 42% was from crops, including nursery and greenhouse crops. Cow dairy alone accounted for 44.6% of sales value and ranked third nationally, and in 1998 the state was ranked second in apple production, third in corn silage, fourth in tart cherries, seventh in strawberries, and tenth in potatoes, and is also a top-ten national producer of grapes, onions, sweet corn, tomatoes, and maple syrup.

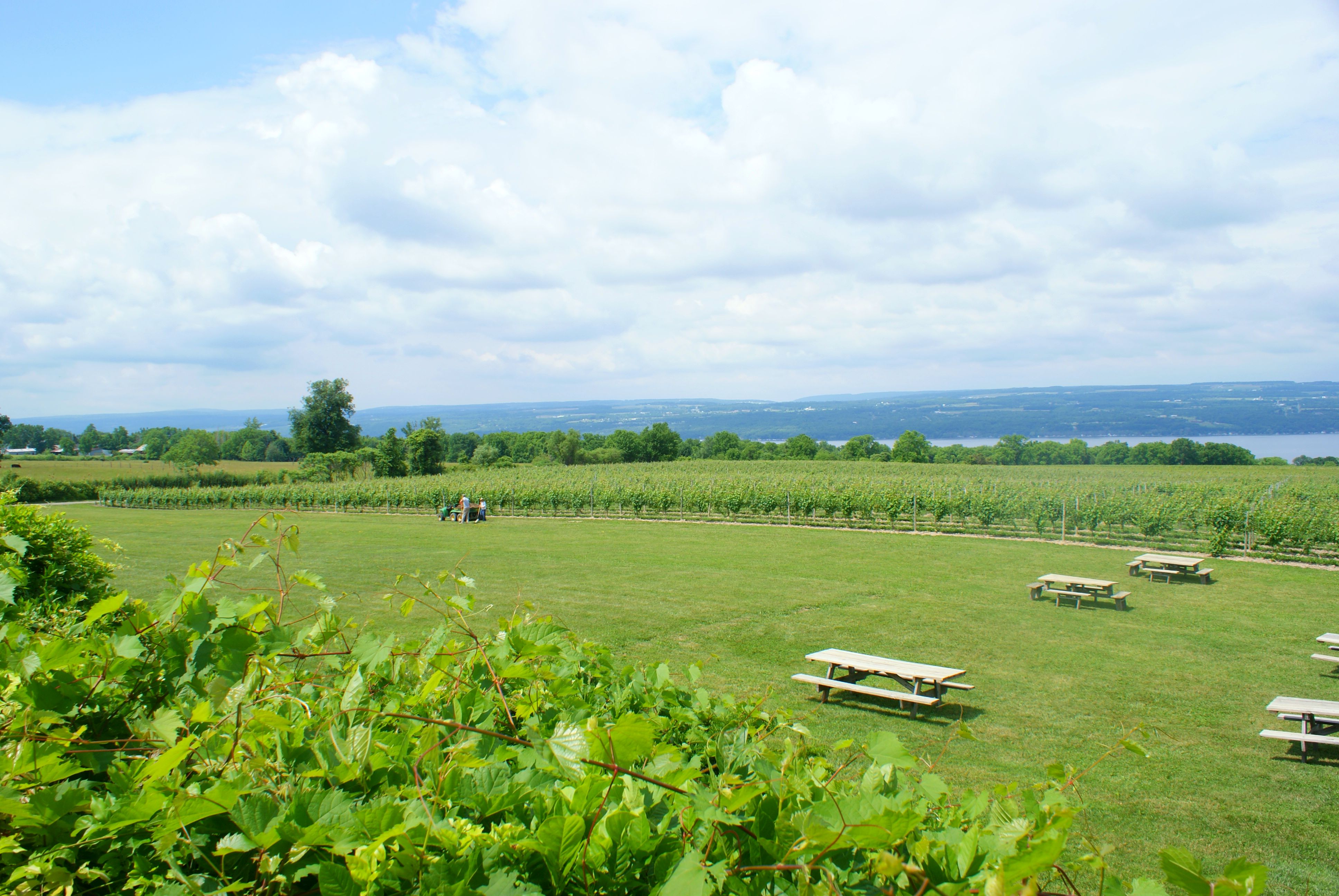
A vineyard of the Seneca Lake AVA

=== Livestock, poultry, and their products ===
The New York cow dairy farming industry created over $2.5 billion in milk sales value in 2015 and $2.4 billion in 2012, accounting for 44.6% of all agricultural sales value and making New York the 3rd largest cow milk producer in the country by sales. Dairy products make up the majority of the state's foreign agricultural exports.

=== Wine ===
New York wine refers to wine made from grapes grown in the U.S. state of New York. New York ranks second in grape production by volume after California, having produced 27.9 million US gallons (106 million litres) in 2024. The majority of New York's grape area is planted to Vitis labrusca varieties (mostly Concord). The rest is equally divided between Vitis vinifera and French hybrids.

=== Crops ===
New York is a top-ten national producer of apples, grapes, onions, sweet corn, tomatoes, and maple syrup. In 1998, the state ranked second in apples, third in corn silage, fourth in tart cherries, seventh in strawberries, and tenth in potatoes. Crops accounted for $2.25 billion in sales in 2012. There are over fifty thousand acres of apple orchards and approximately 694 commercial apple growers, concentrated in the Champlain Valley, Hudson Valley, Finger Lakes and Niagara Frontier regions.

Some sources rank potatoes as number one in economic value among vegetables. New York is also top-two or -three nationwide in cabbage acreage and production, and it has also been claimed that cabbage is the highest earning vegetable in the state. An upstate New York farm was the first to cultivate sugar snap peas at scale, after the cultivar was developed in Twin Falls, Idaho.

== Regions ==
The Finger Lakes region is the center of state agriculture. The top five counties by sales value in 2012 were Wyoming, Cayuga, Suffolk, Genesee, and St. Lawrence counties. In the Western New York region, Chautauqua County is the state's top producer of grapes while Allegany County is the state's top producer of hogs and pigs.

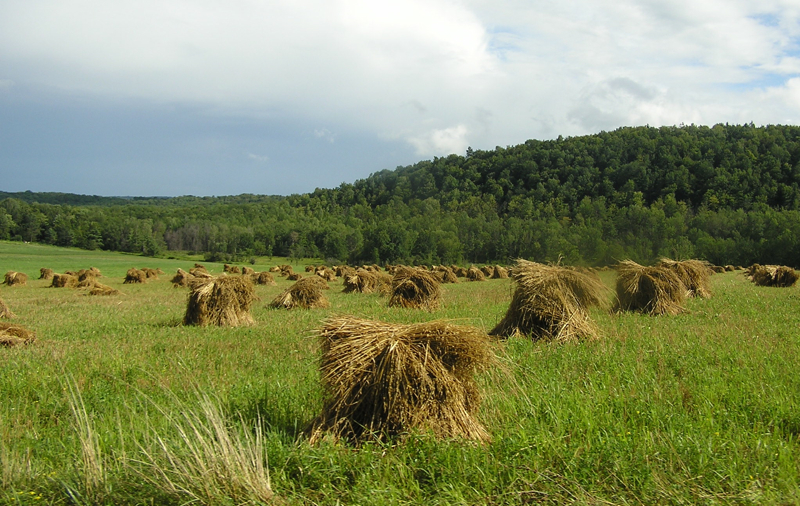
Farmland in rural Steuben County

Honeoye soil, located mainly on the low plateau in the northern part of the Appalachian Plateau, in the southern part of the Ontario Lowland, and Mohawk Valley, is recognized as one of the most productive agricultural soils and as the quasi-official New York state soil.

The Black Dirt Region is a super-fertile region of muck located in southern Orange County within the Hudson Valley region, northwest of New York City. Muck soils are defined by the USDA as made up of relatively deep organic deposits of partially or almost completely decomposed plant material.

== Government ==
The NYS Department of Agriculture and Markets (Ag Department) enforces laws relating to agriculture, weights and measures, and the production, processing, transportation, storage, marketing and distributing of food. The Soil and Water Conservation Committee (SWCC) is an independent agency within the department that supports natural resources management through the support of water and soil conservation districts.

In 2012, New York received $6.01 billion in agricultural subsidies, ranking second with 10% of the total nationwide. The Dairy Acceleration Program assists dairy farms, and is administered by the Ag Department and NYS Environmental Conservation Department and coordinated by the Cornell CALS PRO-DAIRY program. The Excelsior Jobs Program is administered by the NYS Economic Development Department and encourages creation of jobs and investments in industries such as agriculture. The Ag Department also administers the Good Agricultural Practices (GAP)/Good Handling Practices (GHP) Certification Assistance Program is a cost sharing and reimbursement program assisting with the cost of a GAP/GHP food safety audit. The SWCC administers the Nonpoint Source Abatement and Control Grant Program which can share up to 75% of costs for controlling agricultural nonpoint source pollution, and the Climate Resilient Farming Program for reducing agricultural impacts on climate change (e.g., agricultural waste storage cover and flare systems; on-farm riparian, floodplain, and upland water management systems; and soil health systems).

The US Natural Resources Conservation Service continues to set standards for water conservation best management practices (BMP) and administers farm bill conservation programs such as the Environmental Quality Incentives Program (EQIP), Agricultural Management Assistance Program (AMA), Conservation Stewardship Program (CSP), Farm and Ranch Lands Protection Program (FRPP), Wildlife Habitat Incentives Program (WHIP), and the Wetlands Reserve Program (WRP).

== Employment ==
In 2012, there were 61,000 agricultural jobs resulting in $731 million in payroll expenses, from 10,000 farms (29% of all farms). There were also an additional 56,000 farm operators, with 75% being over 45 years old and the average age being 55 years old. In 2015, the dairy industry alone hired almost 20,000 people.

Farm Credit East has reported that among those farmers that use the H-2A Visa program, which is already heavily regulated and burdensome, many have reported it has becoming increasingly unworkable due to significant and unexpected delays, and reiterated longstanding concerns with an inadequate labor supply. The cow dairy industry uses permanent employees who are ineligible for H-2A Visas, causing problems with labor supply and making it a target for immigration enforcement. Responding to the 2016 proposed $15 minimum wage increase, Farm Credit East argued that it would reduce farm net income by 31–51% due to farm's general inability to pass-on costs in a global market.

== Education ==
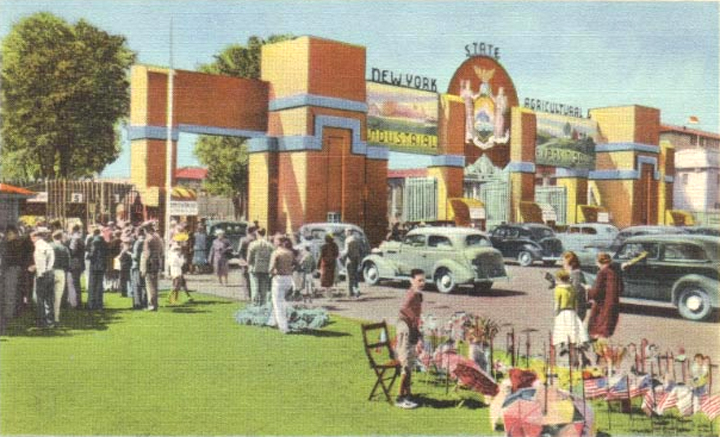
Postcard showing the Great New York State Fair main entrance in the 1940s

Both 4-H and FFA are national youth organizations traditionally focused on agriculture and farming. Farm Credit East maintains a scholarship program for those pursuing a post-high school education (including colleges and technical schools) who can demonstrate an intention for a career in agriculture, forestry or commercial fishing. Farm Credit East also maintains a scholarship program for teachers attending an institute of the Curriculum for Agricultural Science Education (CASE).

Pathways in Technology Early College High School (PTECH) is an early college high school partnership between SUNY Cobleskill, Fulton–Montgomery Community College, Hamilton–Fulton–Montgomery BOCES, and other businesses focusing on agriculture and other pathways. The Cornell University College of Agriculture and Life Sciences (CALS or Ag School) in Ithaca is New York's land grant and statutory college of agriculture supervised by the State University of New York (SUNY) system. The CALS PRO-DAIRY program focuses on educational programming and applied research for the New York dairy industry.

== See also ==
- Fruit Belt
- Agriculture in Florida
