= New York State Department of Agriculture and Markets =

Department of the New York state government

Department of Agriculture and Markets

Department overview
- Formed: April 29, 1926
- Jurisdiction: New York
- Department executive: Richard Ball, Commissioner
- Key document: Agriculture and Markets Law
- Website: agriculture.ny.gov

The New York State Department of Agriculture and Markets is the department of the New York state government that enforces laws relating to agriculture, weights and measures, and the production, processing, transportation, storage, marketing and distributing of food. It principally investigates animal and plant diseases, regulates food safety and labeling, promotes state agriculture, and administers the New York State Fair. Its regulations are compiled in title 1 of the New York Codes, Rules and Regulations.

== Agroeconomy ==
Agriculture is a major component of the New York economy. As of the 2012 census of agriculture, there were over 35,000 farms covering an area of 7 million acres (28,000 km^{2}) which contributed $5.4 billion in gross sales value and $1.2 billion in net farm income to the national economy. The Finger Lakes region is the center of state agriculture, and the state is a top-ten national producer of cow milk, apples, grapes, onions, sweet corn, tomatoes, and maple syrup.

== Structure and services ==
=== Kosher food registry ===
New York State's concern for consumer protection of those seeking to buy kosher food was documented in the 1920s, but a New York Times article noted that some legal protection "originated in the late 19th century."

While the department "maintains an online registry of food represented as kosher" it does not define what is kosher. Consumers are provided, per the Kosher Law Protection Act of 2004, with "information identifying the person or organization certifying that food as kosher," and as of 2005 may also search online.

In addition, the department verifies that claims about this "food product, ... food establishment or a caterer" are in compliance with consumer protection standards. In 1986 there were 12 inspectors, headed by Schulem Rubin, Director of the Kosher Law Enforcement Division. One significant change Rubin made was to add more people with experience as kosher butchers.

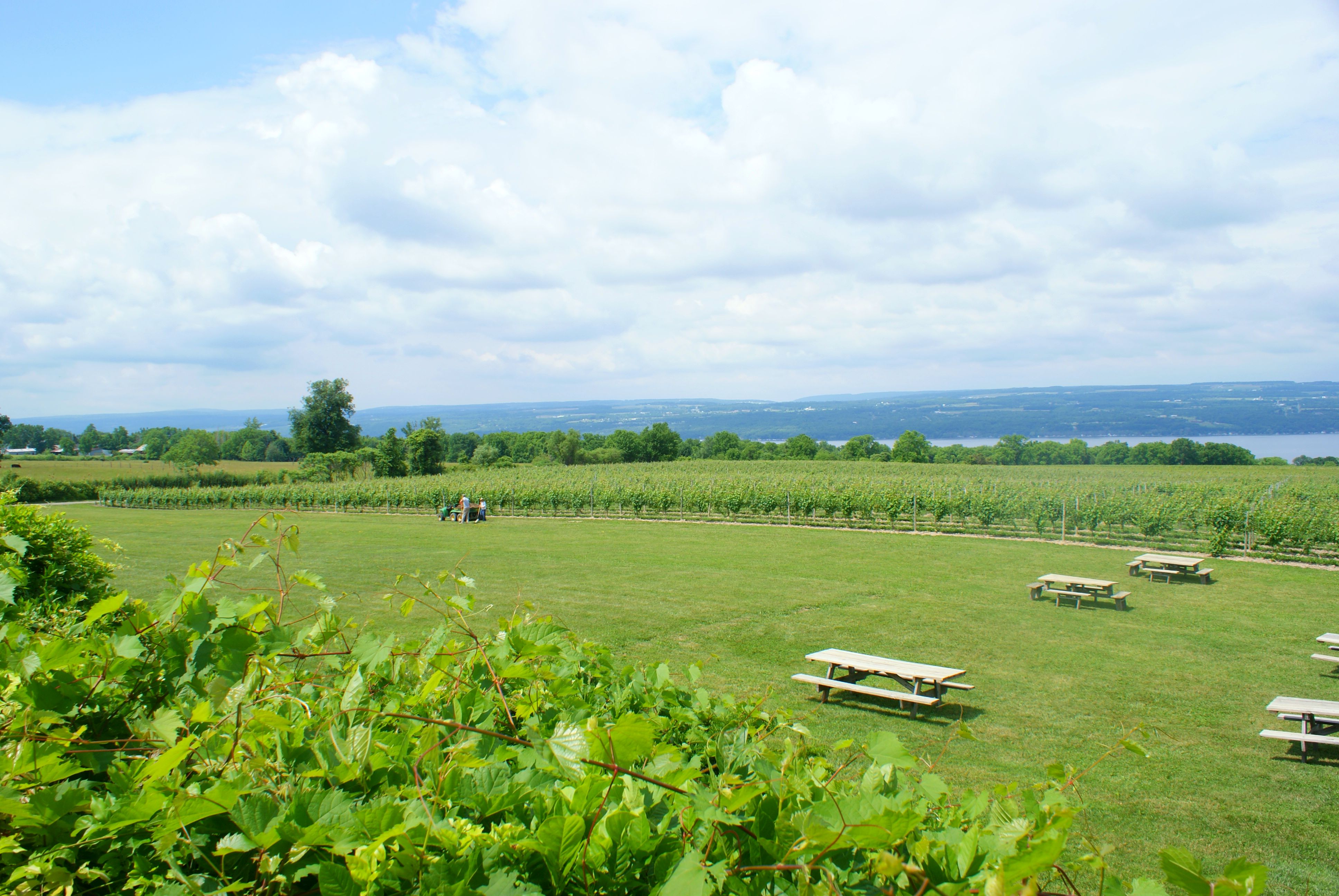
A vineyard of the Seneca Lake AVA

Based on legislation passed in July 2004, data is submitted by those "involved in the kosher food industry" and also about qualifications of those who provide certification.

=== Soil and water conservation ===
The New York State Soil and Water Conservation Committee is an independent agency within the department that supports natural resources management through the support of soil and water conservation districts, which represent each of the 57 counties of New York and New York City (for the 5 counties thereof).

The state committee administers the Agricultural Nonpoint Source Pollution (NPS) Abatement and Control Grant Program, the Agricultural Environmental Management (AEM) Base Program, the annual district reimbursement, and provides review and oversight for AEM Planner certification. The US Natural Resources Conservation Service continues to set standards for water conservation best management practices (BMP) and administers farm bill conservation programs such as the Environmental Quality Incentives Program (EQIP), Agricultural Management Assistance Program (AMA), Conservation Stewardship Program (CSP), Farm and Ranch Lands Protection Program (FRPP), Wildlife Habitat Incentives Program (WHIP), and the Wetlands Reserve Program (WRP).

== History ==
The department's progenitor was the 1884 New York State Dairy Commission that inspected dairy production and sales facilities, which was abolished in 1893 and its functions transferred to the Department of Agriculture that inspected farms, set agricultural quality standards, and operated agricultural experiment stations. A separate Department of Foods and Markets was established in 1914 to set standards for grading and selling food, supervise markets, and publish information on dairy prices and marketing methods. In 1917, these two departments and the 1851 Office of State Superintendent of Weights and Measures were consolidated into the Department of Farms and Markets, headed by the Council of Farms and Markets.

The current Department of Agriculture and Markets was established as part of the 1926 reorganization of government under Governor Al Smith and was transferred the functions of the Department of Foods and Markets as well as the State Fair Commission. In 1935 the Council of Farms and Markets was abolished and the power to appoint the commissioner transferred to the governor. In February 1937, President Franklin D. Roosevelt sent to the states the Standard State Soil Conservation Districts Law, a model law, and on April 23, 1940 the New York State Soil and Water Conservation Committee was established and the soil and water conservation districts authorized when the Soil Conservation District Law was enacted, and in April 1964 water was added to the jurisdiction and in 1981 the state committee was transferred to the Department of Agriculture and Markets.

== List of commissioners ==
- John J. Dillon, 1st Commissioner of Foods and Markets
- Eugene H. Porter, Commissioner of Foods and Markets (1917–1923)
- Frank Walkley, Commissioner of Agriculture and Markets (1972–1975)

== See also ==
- United States Department of Agriculture (USDA)
- New York Farm Winery Act of 1976
