= Private landowner assistance program =

United States government assistance program

Private landowner assistance program (PLAP) is a class of government assistance program available throughout the U.S. for landowners interested in maintaining, developing, improving and protecting wildlife on their property. Each state provides various programs that assist landowners in agriculture, forestry and conserving wildlife habitat. This helps landowners in the practice of good land stewardship and provides multiple benefits to the environment. Some states offer technical assistance which includes:

- assisting the landowner to decide which programs will fit the landowner's needs,
- assist landowners with processes/procedures,
- and assist in coming up with a plan that will be beneficial to the species present on their land while preserving their natural habitat.

== Landowner incentive programs ==
Landowner incentive programs work to financially assist landowners in the restoration and protection of endangered species Generally any private landowner or organization can apply for assistance but preference is given to areas in greatest need of protection.

Wildlife Habitat Incentives Program (WHIP)

WHIP is a voluntary landowner program that is devoted to the improvement of upland wildlife habitat. It is available in all 50 states and has enrolled nearly 11,000 landowners totaling 1,600,000 acres (6,500 km^{2}) since its beginning in 1998. Eligibility is limited to privately owned, federal, tribal and government lands (Limited). Once approved, land management plans are designed with one of two primary agendas.

- Habitat for declining species
- Wildlife and fishery habitats and sustainable practices

Proposed management plans are considered for 5,10 or 15 year time spans with increased cost-share benefits for longer commitments.

Forest Land Enhancement Program (FLEP)

FLEP is a type of USDS incentive program designed to maintain the long term sustainability of non-industrial private forest. The program provides financial and educational assistance to landowners that compose a qualifying management plan. Initially proposed plans must be 10 years management strategies and can manage no more than 1,000 acres (4.0 km^{2}) (additional area can be added in special cases).

Tax incentives

Another way landowners can be persuaded to conserve their private land is through tax incentive programs. For example, Louisiana has a tax exemption program providing tax relief for landowner that commit to specific management plans.

== Agricultural conversion programs ==
Conservation Reserve Program - State Acres for wildlife Enhancement (SAFE)

The United States Department of Agriculture USDA started the Conservation Reserve Program as part of the Food Security Act of 1985. The program is designed to provide assistance and incentive for farmers to maintain sustainable farming practices and to encourage the development of natural wildlife habitat.

The State Acres for wildlife Enhancement (SAFE) program was approved by the USDS as an offshoot of the Conservation Reserve Program. The program is designed to further protect threatened and endangered species habitat through the restoration of eligible property. The overall goal of the program is to restore and enhance up to but no more than 500,000 acres (2,000 km^{2}) of wildlife habitat. Eligibility requirements, designated SAFE zones and sign-up practices vary from state to state.

Agricultural Management Assistance

Agricultural Management Assistance (AMA) can provide financial assistance to farming landowners willing to volunteer their land for conservation. Funding can be used in a variety of management plans including; windbreak planting, irrigation improvements, soil erosion control, sustainable pest management or development of new organic farming operations. The AMA has a limited annual budget of $20million and individual landowners can qualify for up to $50,000 in AMA payments per year. AMA is available in 15 states and interested landowners can apply via their local Natural Resources Conservation Service (NRCS) or conservation district office.

Grassland Reserve Program

The grassland reserve program is a voluntary landowner program than provides financial and educational support to landowners wishing to maintain or enhance grasslands on their property. The program allows for restoration of multiple types of grasslands including shrub-land, pasture, and range. The grassland reserve programs main goal is to prevent the conversion of native grasslands to other land uses such as development and agriculture. Once protected the land does not necessary remain untouched. Easements may be applied for which allow temporary practices such as grazing, hay harvest, seed harvest or mowing to occur. All temporary easements are decided on while taking disturbance possibilities into account. In terms of land cover, grasslands have the highest percentage of coverage with more than 535,000,000 acres (2,170,000 km^{2}) in the United States alone.

Grazing Land Conservation Initiative (GLCI)

The Grazing Land Conservation Initiative (GLCI) is set up to help improve grazing land that is privately owned. This program targets landowners and promotes the maintenance of private grazing land in order to produce higher quality grass than previously found in a specific location. The GLCI provides education materials for anyone who is interested in improving their private grazing land.

Conservation of Private Grazing Land Program (CPGL)

Conservation of Private Grazing Land Program (CPGL) provides private landowners with the necessary tools to maintain high quality grasslands. The primary agenda of the CPGL is to increase the diversity of the land and aid in water managing practices for grazing. No funding is available through this program.

== Forest legacy program ==
The Forest Legacy Program (FLP) is a Federal program in partnership with individual states that protect forests which are environmentally sensitive or endangered. The program focuses on interests and issues that deal with privately owned forests. The FLP provides financial assistance for privately owned forest that is endangered due to anthropogenic development, or forest that has become fragmented due to previous practices. The Forest Legacy program provides alternatives for landowners located in these troubled forested areas. The FLP also develops cooperative conservation plans that allow private landowners to retain land ownership without the need to negotiate property rights. This reduces the effort needed to maintain a sustainable management plan and ultimately increases the benefit to the forest. The Forest Legacy Program has two main goals. The first is to support property acquisition and the second is to acquire donated conservation easements. Participation in the FLP program is limited to private land owners and the federal government funds up to 75% of the costs that are involved. The remaining 25% comes from the landowners as well as other local and state resources. The FLP program has partnered with the Montana Department of Fish, Wildlife and Parks in an effort to protect almost 8,000 acres (32 km^{2}) of forested terrain. The Forest Legacy Program has websites for specific states working together.

== Forest stewardship programs ==
The Forest Stewardship Program (FSP) provides assistance to non-industrial private forest owners by encouraging and enabling them for long-term forest management. The program provides landowners with information on development and multi-source planning in an effort to manage private forests for goods and services. Increased economic output along with increased output from the forest is the main goal of the program. Since its introduction, the program has developed 270,000 management plans that consist of more than 31,000,000 acres (130,000 km^{2}) of private land. Stewardship plans promote forest health and development through active management while providing timber, wildlife habitat, natural watersheds, recreational opportunities and many other benefits. Stewardship plans also motivate landowners to become actively involved in planning and managing their land which eventually can lead healthier and more productive forests. Participation in forest stewardship programs is generally open to all private landowners who are committed to a management plan for at least ten years.

== Forestry Contractors ==
Forestry contractors are local individuals and professionals that can provide landowners with general forest management information and assistance on a wide range of questions and projects. Forestry contractors assist private landowners on issues such as; species identification, timber management, timber stand improvement, timber sales, wildlife management and habitat improvement, endangered and threatened species information, erosion management, recreational development, tree and shrub selection, hazard tree appraisal, forest inventory and damage appraisal. Contact information for forestry contractors and other service forestry experts can generally be found on local Department of Natural Resource Websites.

== Urban and community forestry programs ==
Urban and community forests are the trees, plants and ecosystems occurring in developed areas. Urban and community forestry programs work to create and maintain sustainable communities and improve overall urban aesthetics. Programs are designed to conserve natural resources by utilizing a variety of tools including property tax assessment and forest easement programs. They assist landowners with species identification and management of existing community forests with the main goal of creating healthy functional ecosystems within residential communities. Urban and community forestry programs are not only limited to trees and shrubs but also to the factors that contribute to the growth of these organisms. Additional factors include soil, water and air quality. These programs educate citizens on proper tree planting techniques, gardening, nature and how to utilize their land more efficiently. Investments in this program provide clean air and water, energy conservation, reduction in greenhouse gases and add beauty to urban areas.

== Watershed forestry programs ==
Watersheds or drainage basins are an area of land that drain into a common water body such as stream, lake, estuary, aquifer or ocean. The Watershed Approach is an important framework to address today's water challenges. More than $450 billion in food and fiber, manufactured goods, and tourism depends on clean water and healthy watersheds. The watershed approach consists of three main strategies:

- Hydrologically defined: which takes geography and all other factors into consideration
- Involves the stakeholders: which includes the federal, state, local and private sectors
- Strategically addresses water resource goals: which focuses on the water quality and habitat of a particular region. The strategy uses adaptive management and multiple programs which consist of mandatory and voluntary aspects

The Environmental Protection Agency (EPA) has created a website for which contains information about sources of funding of practitioners and funders that have the goal to serve and protect the watersheds.

== Nursery and seedbank programs ==
Nursery and seedbank programs aid conservation programs by supplying trees and shrubs at different successive levels. Plant materials are available for both private and public conservation programs and must be used for the following conservation purposes:

- Windbreaks
- Shelterbelts
- Woodlots
- Erosion Control
- Wildlife Habitat
- Christmas Tree Farms
- Streambank Stabilization
- Greenstripping
- Mine Reclamation

== Northeastern forest legacy program ==
The Northeastern Forest Legacy Program is an alliance between the USDA Forest Service and the individual states to protect the forest for the future generations. The purpose of this program is to preserve the forest areas that are threatened by the conversion to non forest uses. Seventy five percent of the programs that belong to this alliance are funded by the government and the other 25% comes from private, state, and local communities or organizations. The technique used to protect the forests is conservation easement. Land that has scenic value, fish and wildlife value, contains endangered or threatened species are prioritized. Some of the main characteristics of the program are:

- It is voluntary
- The program helps state and local to identify important areas that need immediate attention
- The program is based on a “willing seller and willing buyer” concept
- When conservation easements are used the land remains privately owned
- FLP consists of protection tools such as full-fee purchase, voluntary deed restriction, and agreements

== Illinois Acres for Wildlife ==
Illinois Acres for Wildlife is an Illinois Department of Natural Resources (IDNR) voluntary program designed to provide assistance to private landowners wishing to maintain their property. The ultimate goal of the program is to inform and educate landowners so they understand how their property fits into a broad management plan. The IDNR provides an initial resource assessment for participating landowners in order to design an effective management plan. No financial assistance is described or offered by the acres for wildlife program but the IDNR can provide seed and seedling stock for qualifying areas.

Note: This Illinois plan was discontinued in 2020 per Jeff Horn of the Illinois Department of Natural Resources.

== American Tree Farm System ==
"Wood is a crop. Forestry is Tree Farming." — Gifford Pinchot, First chief of the USDA Forest Service.

The American Tree Farm system is an organized collection of private landowners interested in effectively managing their woodland properties. Founded in 1941, the ATFS consists of more than 27,500,000 acres (111,000 km^{2}) of privately owned forest in 46 states. There are 4,400 volunteers who inspect the forest grounds and there are 87,000 family forest owners. The ATFS is primarily known for continuous wood and timber production but it also consists of many programs and committees that work to ensure the protection of wildlife habitats, watersheds, soil quality and recreation for communities. The habitat and resources that tree farms provided differ greatly based on their location and by the species of trees that are planted. Farms in the system attempt to maintain a healthy level of biodiversity by creating natural forest buffers, practicing sustainable harvesting techniques and by minimizing land fragmentation. Tree farm systems in each state are self-governing and all work under specific guidelines developed by the ATFS's National Operating Committee. The term tree farming was introduced in 1940 by linking the terms in an attempt to make it easier for the public to conceptualize that trees are renewable resources.

== Forest Landowners Association (FLA) ==
60% of the nation's forestlands are privately owned. In order to sustain private forests FLA works to sustain the people who own them. The association works on the behalf of all private landowners interests regardless of whether they are members or not. Since 1941, FLA has provided its members, who own and operate more than 40 million acres of forestland in 48 states, with education, information, and national grassroots advocacy, which enables them to sustain their forestlands across generations and help protect the rights of America's private forest landowners - along with the diverse habitats, clean water and air, recreation and the other, benefits that private forests provide. Outreach on behalf of private forest landowners nationwide enhances landowners forestland management practices and stewardship.

Viable markets and reasonable regulations are fundamental to sustaining private forests, forestry related jobs and forest stewardship. FLA communicates advice, support and information to policy makers on behalf of all private landowners, on how proposed legislation could affect private forest management, stewardship and owners’ rights. FLA provides a voice for forest landowners on national and regional issues, and follows legislation appearing before Congress that affects forest landowners and their property.

Members of the Forest Landowners Association are a diverse group of individual & institutional landowners, consulting foresters, and corporations. Motives for their support are varied but FLA is an advocate of all private landowners-regardless of size, corporate structure, location, certification status, or tax classification. Forest Landowners Association works with many organizations.

== Wetland Reserve Program (WRP) ==
The Wetland Reserve Program (WRP) funds landowners that volunteer their land for wetland development and provides opportunities for landowners participate in the maintenance of the project. The land must meet specific requirement to receive funding and the program is set up for each state in the United States.

The Landowner has up to three choices:

- Permanent Easement
- 30-Year Easement
- Restoration Cost-Share Agreement

== U.S. Department of Natural Resource External links ==
The following list is a collection of links to state department websites and other natural resource organizations. Each link is specific to the many private landowner services provided by different departments throughout the United States.

- Alabama-http://www.dcnr.state.al.us/
- Alaska-http://www.state.ak.us/adfg/
- Arizona-http://www.gf.state.az.us/
- Arkansas-http://www.agfc.com/index.html
- California-http://www.dfg.ca.gov/
- Colorado-http://wildlife.state.co.us/, http://coloradoriparian.org/
- Connecticut-http://dep.state.ct.us/
- Delaware-http://www.dnrec.state.de.us/fw/
- Florida-http://www.floridaconservation.org//, http://www.floridaforestservice.com/services.html
- Georgia-http://www.DNR.State.GA.US/
- Hawaii-http://www.hawaii.gov/dlnr/
- Idaho-http://www2.state.id.us/fishgame/
- Illinois- http://dnr.state.il.us/OREP/C2000/Incentives.htm#PLWHP
- Indiana- http://www.in.gov/dnr/forestry/
- Iowa- https://web.archive.org/web/20080219134410/http://www.iowadnr.gov/forestry/private.html
- Kansas- https://web.archive.org/web/20080216002459/http://www.kdwp.state.ks.us/news/other_services/private_landowner_assistance
- Kentucky- https://web.archive.org/web/20080221220153/http://fw.ky.gov/navigation.asp?cid=647&NavPath=C100C366
- Louisiana- https://web.archive.org/web/20070813173836/http://www.biodiversitypartners.org/state/la/incentives.shtml
- Maine- http://www.swoam.org/
- Maryland- https://web.archive.org/web/20110809172610/http://www.dnr.state.md.us/wildlife/Habitat/lip_intro.asp
- Massachusetts- http://www.mass.gov/dfwele/dfw/habitat/grants/lip/lip_home.htm
- Michigan- http://www.michigan.gov/dnr/0,1607,7-153-10370_36649---,00.html
- Minnesota- https://web.archive.org/web/20061008132530/http://www.dnr.state.mn.us/lip/index.html - http://files.dnr.state.mn.us/forestry/urban/bmps.pdf
- Mississippi- http://www.mdwfp.com/Level2/Wildlife/Lip/Introduction.asp
- Missouri- https://www.nrcs.usda.gov/nrcs/missouri
- Montana - https://web.archive.org/web/20080224214819/http://dnrc.mt.gov/forestry/Assistance/Stewardship/fsp.asp
- Nevada- https://web.archive.org/web/20080228062800/http://www.forestry.nv.gov/main/resource01.htm
- New Hampshire - http://www.wildlife.state.nh.us/Wildlife/Landowner_LIP_program.htm
- New Jersey - http://www.state.nj.us/dep/parksandforests/forest/njfs_private_lands_mgt.html
- New Mexico - http://www.emnrd.state.nm.us/FD/ForestMgt/ForestStewardship.htm
- New York - http://www.dec.ny.gov/lands/4972.html
- North Carolina - http://www.dfr.state.nc.us/tending/tending_your_forest.htm
- North Dakota - https://web.archive.org/web/20080224085612/http://gf.nd.gov/maps/pli-program.html
- Ohio - http://www.dnr.state.oh.us/Home/landowner/default/tabid/5279/Default.aspx
- Oklahoma - https://web.archive.org/web/20080312180554/http://www.wildlifedepartment.com/laprogrm4.htm
- Oregon - https://web.archive.org/web/20080307050241/http://www.dfw.state.or.us/LIP/
- Pennsylvania - http://www.dcnr.state.pa.us/forestry/privatelands.aspx
- https://web.archive.org/web/20080305052933/http://www.treefarmsystem.org/cms/pages/69_1.html
- Rhode Island- https://web.archive.org/web/20080509072341/http://www.dem.ri.gov/programs/bnatres/forest/index.htm
- South Carolina-http://www.dnr.sc.gov/land/foreststeward.html
- South Dakota-http://www.sdgfp.info/Wildlife/privatelands/Index.htm
- Tennessee-http://www.state.tn.us/twra/tnlip.html
- Texas-http://www.tpwd.state.tx.us/landwater/land/private/ (Private Land)
- http://www.tpwd.state.tx.us/landwater/land/technical_guidance/ (Landowner Assistantship)
- Utah-http://www.ffsl.utah.gov/mmlandownerforassist.php
- Vermont-http://www.vtfpr.org/lands/index.cfm
- Virginia-http://www.dgif.state.va.us/habitat/lip/
- Washington-http://wdfw.wa.gov/lands/lip/
- West Virginia- http://www.joe.org/joe/2004august/rb5.shtml
- Wisconsin- https://web.archive.org/web/20080304062221/http://dnr.wi.gov/forestry/private/financial/costshare.htm
- Wyoming- http://gf.state.wy.us/wildlife/nongame/LIP/index.asp
