= John J. Dillon (publisher) =

American newspaper editor (1865-1950)

John Dillon
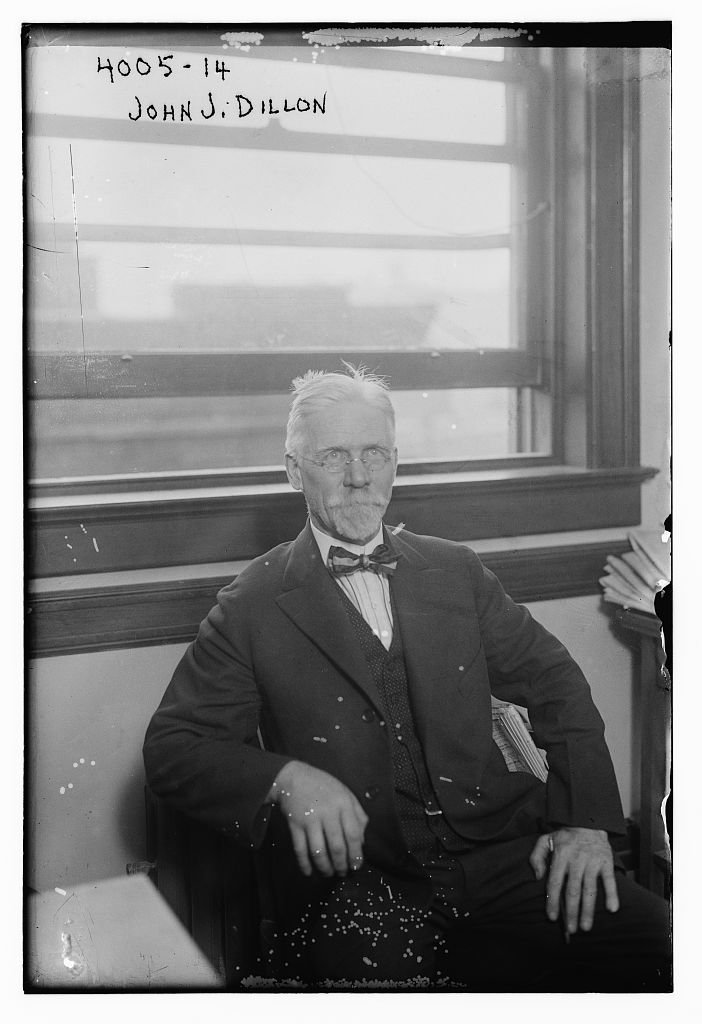

1st New York State Commissioner of Foods and Markets
- In office November 21, 1914 – June 9, 1917
- Governor: Martin Glynn
- Preceded by: Office created
- Succeeded by: Office abolished

Personal details
- Born: November 7, 1856 White Lake, New York, US
- Died: March 1, 1950 (aged 93)
- Resting place: Gate of Heaven Cemetery

John J. Dillon (November 7, 1856 – March 1, 1950) was the editor and publisher of the Rural New Yorker. He was the first commissioner of the New York State Department of Foods and Markets in 1914.

== Biography ==
He was born on November 7, 1856, in White Lake, New York, United States, to Mary Welsh and John Dillon. He attended Liberty Institute (New York) and Albany College (New York) He taught school in Sullivan County, New York in 1874. He worked as an editor at the Orange County Farmer in Port Jervis, New York. He went to work for the Rural New Yorker in 1890 as the advertising manager.

He married Mary C. May. He was appointed as the Commissioner of the New York State Department of Foods and Markets in 1914. While commissioner, he was responsible for one of the largest milk strikes in state history in 1916.

He died on March 1, 1950, at his apartment at the Plaza Hotel in Manhattan, New York City. He was buried in Gate of Heaven Cemetery.

== Publications ==
- Hind Sights (1911)
- Organized Co-Operation (1923)
- Dillon, John J. (1941). Seven Decades of Milk: A History of New York's Dairy Industry. Orange Judd Publishing.

== See also ==
- Agriculture in New York
