= Agricultural policy of the United States =

The agricultural policy of the United States is composed primarily of the periodically renewed federal U.S. farm bills. The Farm Bills have a rich history which initially sought to provide income and price support to U.S. farmers and prevent them from adverse global as well as local supply and demand shocks. This implied an elaborate subsidy program which supports domestic production by either direct payments or through price support measures. The former incentivizes farmers to grow certain crops which are eligible for such payments through environmentally conscientious practices of farming. The latter protects farmers from vagaries of price fluctuations by ensuring a minimum price and fulfilling their shortfalls in revenue upon a fall in price. Lately, there are other measures through which the government encourages crop insurance and pays part of the premium for such insurance against various unanticipated outcomes in agriculture.

According to the United States Department of Agriculture:

"U.S. agricultural policy—often simply called farm policy—generally follows a 5-year legislative cycle that produces a wide-ranging “Farm Bill.” Farm Bills, or Farm Acts, govern programs related to farming, food and nutrition, and rural communities, as well as aspects of bioenergy and forestry. The most recent of these Farm Bills, the Agricultural Improvement Act of 2018 (2018 Farm Bill), authorizes policies in the areas of commodity programs and crop insurance, conservation on agricultural lands, agricultural trade (including foreign food assistance), nutrition (primarily domestic food assistance), farm credit, rural economic development, agricultural research, State and private forestry, bioenergy, and horticulture and organic agriculture. The 2018 Farm Bill replaces the 2014 Farm Bill, in place from 2014 through 2018."

== History of U.S. agricultural policy: 1920 to present ==
In the 1920s, agricultural policies destabilized supply and demand and sunk the nation into its lowest state of economic despair during the Great Depression. Developmental policy included such legislation as the Land Act of 1820, the Homestead Act, which granted 160-acre (0.65 km^{2}) townships, and the Morrill Act of 1862, which initiated the land-grant college system, one in a long series of acts that provided public support for agricultural research and education. In 1933, with many farmers losing money because of the Great Depression, President Franklin D. Roosevelt signed the Agricultural Adjustment Act, which created the Agricultural Adjustment Administration (AAA). The AAA began to regulate agricultural production by destroying crops and artificially reducing supplies. It also offered subsidies to farmers to encourage them to willingly limit their production of crops. The Supreme Court later struck down the AAA as unconstitutional, so in 1938 the Soil Conservation and Domestic Allotment Act was passed, which essentially created a similar organization for distributing farmer subsidies.

=== 1920-1939: Beginning of price supports ===
At the end of World War I, the destructive effects of the war and the surrender burdens enforced on the Central Powers of Europe bankrupted much of Europe, closing major export markets in the United States and beginning a series of events that would lead to the development of agricultural price and income support policies. United States price and income support, known otherwise as agricultural subsidy, grew out of acute farm income and financial crises, which led to widespread political beliefs that the market system was not adequately rewarding farm people for their agricultural commodities.

Beginning with the 1921 Packers and Stockyards Act and 1922 Capper–Volstead Act, which regulated livestock and protected farmer cooperatives against anti-trust suits, United States agricultural policy began to become more and more comprehensive. In reaction to falling grain prices and the widespread economic turmoil of the Dust Bowl (1931–39) and Great Depression (October 1929–33), three bills led the United States into permanent price subsidies for farmers: the 1922 Grain Futures Act, the June 1929 Agricultural Marketing Act, and finally the 1933 Agricultural Adjustment Act – the first comprehensive food policy legislation.

Out of these bills grew a system of government-controlled agricultural commodity prices and government supply control (farmers being paid to leave land unused). Supply control would continue to be used to decrease overproduction, leading to over 50,000,000 acres (200,000 km^{2}) to be set aside during times of low commodity prices (1955–1973, 1984–1995). The practice was eventually ended by the Federal Agriculture Improvement and Reform Act of 1996.

=== 1940-1969: Increased comprehensiveness ===
Over time, a variety of related topics began to be addressed by agricultural policy: soil conservation (1956 Soil Bank Act), surplus crops as food aid (National School Lunch Act of 1946, Agricultural Trade Development and Assistance Act of 1954, the 1964 Food Stamp Act).

During this time, agricultural financial support also increased, through raised price supports, export subsidies, increased crop insurance (1938 Agricultural Adjustment Act), expanding price supports to different crops (Agricultural Risk Protection Act of 2000), offering more guaranteed federal loans, and through the replacement of some price supports with fixed payments (Food and Agricultural Act of 1962 and Federal Agriculture Improvement and Reform Act of 1996).

Senator Hubert Humphrey proposed to use the agricultural surpluses as part of American foreign aid in 1953. This proposal helped the U.S. address the surplus crops while other states could use their local currencies to trade during the Cold War.

On the other hand, the failed policies, including the Brannan Plan in 1949, aimed to solve the agricultural surpluses caused by price supports for farmers by providing "compensatory payments." Conservatives were the major forces that opposed this farm bill. The outbreak of the Korean War in 1950 also consumed the surpluses that made this farm bill invalid.

=== 1970-1980 ===
Beginning with the administration of Secretary of Agriculture Henry A. Wallace, the United States had generally moved to curb overproduction. However, in the early 1970s, under Secretary of Agriculture Earl Butz, farmers were encouraged to "get big or get out" and to plant "hedgerow to hedgerow". Over the course of the 20th century, farms have consolidated into larger, more capital-intensive operations and subsidy policy under Butz encouraged these large farms at the expense of small and medium-sized family farms.

The percentage of Americans who live on a farm diminished from nearly 25% during the Great Depression to about 2% now, and only 0.1% of the United States population works full-time on a farm. As the agribusiness lobby grows to near $60 million per year, the interests of agricultural corporations remain highly represented. In recent years, farm subsidies have remained high even in times of record farm profits.

=== 1981-1995 ===
Starting in 1985, several agricultural policies addressed wetlands and habitat conservation (Food Security Act of 1985, 1990 Wetlands Reserve Program, 1996 Wildlife Habitat and Environmental Quality Incentive Programs and 2002 Grassland Reserve Program). Wetlands Reserve Program (WRP) is a voluntary program implemented by the U.S. Department of Agriculture (USDA) that USDA may purchase conservation easements from eligible landowners who voluntarily protect wetlands by restoring, maintaining, and improving the hydrologic conditions, native species, and natural topography of the wetlands. Wildlife Habitat Incentives Program proposed by USDA aimed to respond to the decreasing wildlife species by promoting voluntary farm management practices to protect and maintain habitat for wildlife. The Grassland Reserve Program (GRP) is a voluntary program proposed by USDA that assisted landowners to improve the grasslands' quality on their property.

Organic Food Production Act of 1990 (Food, Agriculture, Conservation, and Trade Act of 1990) directs the Secretary of Agriculture to establish a national organic production certification program; a label for organic products; a national list of approved and prohibited substances for organic productions; and a certifying agency program.

=== 1996: U.S. agricultural policy reform ===
In 1996, the U.S. agricultural policy reform started with the Federal Agriculture Improvement and Reform Act of 1996 (1996 Act) that the agricultural market should be determined by the free market competition that the government canceled agricultural subsidies and required farmers to enroll in the Crop Insurance Program. The U.S. agricultural policy reform was caused by the agricultural and budget pressures combined with the growth in the U.S. economy level and the developments in the agricultural sector. The Crop Insurance Program was first proposed in the 1930s to assist agriculture recover from the Great Depression and the Dust Bowl. In 1996, farmers were required to purchase crop insurance or will lost the eligibility to receive other disaster benefits.

=== 2021-present: Clean energy and infrastructure initiatives ===
In response to the decline of over half a million family farms over the past forty years, the United States has launched a strategy focusing on clean energy promotion and infrastructure enhancement. This initiative, supported by the $1 trillion infrastructure law enacted in 2021, aims to revitalize the agricultural sector by investing in sustainable farming practices and creating new market opportunities, including for crop-based sustainable aviation fuel (SAF). The strategy seeks to improve export capabilities and enhance revenue for farmers through increased sales in local and regional markets. By doing so, it aims to support the economic viability of smaller farms and reinforce the U.S.'s standing in global agricultural markets.

== Political and economic dynamics ==
From a Congressional Budget Office report

A large reason why agricultural policy has favored farmers over the course of United States history is because farmers tend to have favorable proportional political representation in government. The United States Senate tends to grant more power per person to inhabitants of rural states. Also, because the United States House of Representatives is re-apportioned only every 10 years by the United States Census, and population tends to shift from rural to urban areas, farmers are often left with greater proportional power until the re-apportionment is complete.

Also, the majority of agricultural policy research is funded by the USDA. Some economists believe this creates an incentive for government intervention because, among other considerations, the USDA will most likely not fund research criticizing its own activities.

== Agricultural exceptionalism ==
Some commenters argue that American agriculture policy can be characterized by "agricultural exceptionalism," which is the idea that the American agriculture industry has been able to win exemptions from regulations that affect other industries.

Of particular focus are climate, labor, and animal welfare policy. For example, some critics argue that industrial farming has escaped enforcement under the Clean Water Act despite the environmental damage caused by runoff from industrial animal agriculture; many agricultural workers are exempt from labor protection laws like the Fair Labor Standards Act and workplace safety protections; and farms are exempt from the Animal Welfare Act, meaning that billions of animals raised in American farms have virtually no federal welfare protections.

Agriculture has also received exemptions from tariffs, COVID-19 public health regulations, and immigration laws.

== Health issues ==
Researchers have suggested that agricultural subsidies in the United States have worsened trends of obesity and related health issues, by primarily subsidizing the production of corn, soybeans, and wheat, thus significantly reducing the prices of high-fructose corn syrup, vegetable oils, and grain-fed livestock.

== See also ==
- Agriculture in the United States

General:

- Buffer initiative
- Food vs fuel
- Agricultural subsidy
- Normal crop acreage
- Title 7 of the United States Code
