= Marketing assessments =

Payments in United States agricultural policy

Marketing assessments are payments in United States agricultural policy. At times, producers and first purchasers of some supported commodities are required to pay assessments as a contribution towards achieving budget deficit reduction targets. Under the 1996 farm bill (P.L. 104-127), assessments were imposed on sugar processors, producers, and first buyers of peanuts. However, the 1996 farm bill (P.L. 104-127) eliminated a milk marketing assessment. The 2002 farm bill (P.L. 107-171) eliminated the assessments for peanuts and sugar. Tobacco was subject to a no-net-cost assessment on all marketings to offset Commodity Credit Corporation (CCC) losses on price support loan operations until support was ended in 2005 under the quota buyout provision (P.L. 108-357, Title VI).
