= Geographically disadvantaged farmers and ranchers =

In United States agricultural policy, geographically disadvantaged farmers and ranchers are defined in the 2002 farm bill (P.L. 107–171, Sec. 10906) as a farmer or rancher in an insular area or a state other than one of the 48 contiguous states. This law requires the USDA to submit a report to the U.S. House Committee on Agriculture and the U.S. Senate Committee on Agriculture describing barriers to agricultural production in such regions. The report also outlines means of encouraging and assisting those in such areas to own and operate farms and ranches while participating in USDA agricultural programs.
