= Utilization rates (milk) =

In United States agricultural policy, utilization rates refer to the percentage of milk in federal milk marketing orders that is used in each of the classes: Class IV (butter and nonfat dry milk), Class III (cheese), Class II (all other manufactured products), Class I (milk used for fluid consumption). Utilization rates serve as weights for determining the weighted average price, or blend price, received by dairy farmers within a region each month.
