= Schulem Rubin =

American Orthodox rabbi (1926–2001)

Schulem Rubin (June 26, 1926 – June 21, 2001) was an American Orthodox rabbi. He served "three successive New York governors ... for more than two decades" as "Director of the Kosher Law Enforcement Division" of the New York State Department of Agriculture and Markets, a position whose responsibilities included appearance in court defending New York State's kosher laws.

For half a century, he also served as rabbi of Young Israel of Pelham Parkway, one of the largest Orthodox synagogues in the Bronx at one point.

== Kosher Law Enforcement Division ==
The Washington Post published an interview in which Rubin noted that the higher price of kosher chicken is even higher "right before a holiday."

The New York Times printed in 2005 that inspectors were "annually visiting about 4,000 businesses that dealt in kosher products in the state." As of 1986 there were 12 inspectors, and they found red-handed evidence of improper soaking/salting of meats sold in stores claiming that their meats are kosher. His testimony involved some challenging situations and not all of them resulted in an immediate "win".

The division also operates a consumer-searchable online database.

== Personal ==
Rubin was born in Poland on June 26, 1926. His Jewish education was at Yeshiva Chaim Berlin, from which he received rabbinical ordination.

Four children were born while he was married (1950-1971) to Chana Bunim Rubin Ausubel. In 1972 he married Helena (nee Blumenfrucht).

In 1972 his attempt to visit American Jewish soldiers held in North Vietnam was declined, but a "Hanoi spokesman also denied that Rabbi Rubin’s request .. had been rejected.
