= Normal crop acreage =

United States agriculture policy

In United States agricultural law, normal crop acreage refers to the acreage on a farm normally devoted to a group of designated crops. When a set-aside program was in effect, a participating farm’s total planted acreage of such designated crops plus set-aside acreage could not exceed the normal crop acreage. The authority for set-asides was eliminated by the 1996 farm bill (P.L. 104-127).
