= Eugene H. Porter =

American physician

Eugene Hoffman Porter (August 7, 1856 – August 11, 1929) was an American physician, farmer, and Commissioner of the New York State Health Department and the Foods and Markets Division.

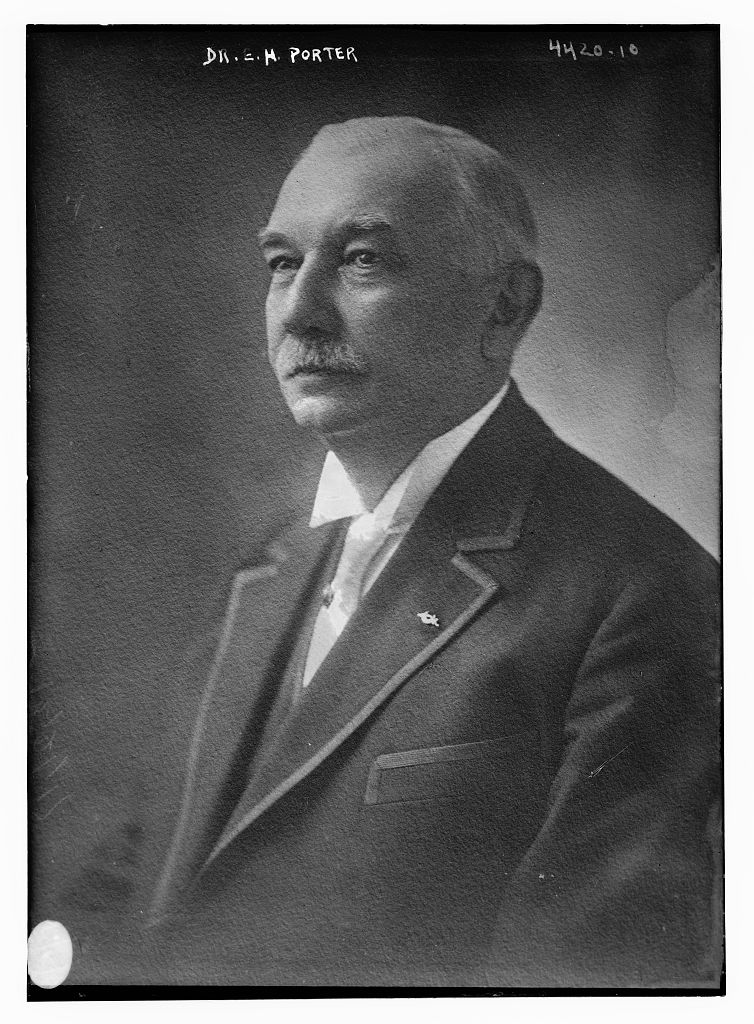
Porter in 1917

== Life ==
Porter was born on August 7, 1856, in Ghent, New York, the son of Curtis H. Porter and Julia Hoffman.

Porter attended the Hudson River Institute in Claverack and Cortland Normal School. He graduated from Cornell University in 1880. He then went to the New York Homeopathic Medical College and Hospital, graduating from there as class valedictorian in 1885. Interested in literary work, he started the Chironian while still a student and served as its first editor-in-chief. He became associate editor of the North American Journal of Homeopathy after he graduated, and in 1892 he assumed sole control of the journal. He also became chair of Chemistry in the medical college immediately following his graduation, which he held until he became Professor of Physiological Materia Medica. By 1899, he was on the governing board of the school's faculty and one of the faculty's representatives in the college senate. In 1894, he was elected General Secretary of the American Institute of Homeopathy. In 1897, he was elected President of the New York State Homeopathic Medical Society. He also became manager of the State Insane Hospital that year.

Porter was consulting physician to the Laura Franklin Free Hospital for Children and the Hahnemann Hospital, a Medical Examiner for the Manhattan Life Insurance Company and Penn Mutual, and Professor of Medical Chemistry and Sanitary Science. He resided in New York City. In 1905, Governor Frank W. Higgins appointed him Commissioner of the New York State Department of Health. Governor Charles Evans Hughes reappointed him to the office in 1909. As Commissioner, he focused on controlling contagious diseases, the matter of the state's polluted streams, the fight against tuberculosis, and a general education effort in public health work. Under him the Health Department established county tuberculosis hospitals and created the New York State Public Health Council, a precursor of the Public Health and Health Planning Council. In 1910, he concluded disease carriers shouldn't be kept in isolation and concluded that Mary Mallon ("Typhoid Mary") should be freed from quarantine, with the promise to help her find work as a domestic but not as a cook. When the original Antitoxin Laboratory in Albany began to fall into disrepair, he petitioned the state for financial assistance to relocate the laboratory animals to a farm. In 1913, he got the funding and the department purchased a farm in Guilderland, later known as Griffin Laboratory.

Porter served as Commissioner until January 1914. In the 1914 election, he unsuccessfully ran in the Republican primary for Secretary of State of New York, losing the primary to Francis M. Hugo. For many years, he lectured at Cornell University on public health and state medicine. He retired from public health work and other professional activities in 1914, devoting himself to managing a dairy farm between five and six hundred acres in Upper Lislie. He became involved in the Dairymen's League, serving as president of the Broome County League and as a director representing Broome and Cortland counties in the parent league. He was also a member of the New York Republican State Committee. In 1917, the Council of Farms and Markets appointed him Commissioner of Foods and Markets. He served as Commissioner until 1923, during which time he lived in Albany and after which he returned to Upper Lislie.

Porter was a member of the New York Academy of Science, the American Academy of Political and Social Science, the National Geographic Society, the New York Museum of Natural History, the American Public Health Association, the New York Press Association, the National Editorial Association, the Cornell Club of New York, the local, county and state Grange, the Broome County Farm Bureau, and the New York State Agricultural Society. He was president of the Board of Education in Triangle. He was also a member of the Feemasons and the Elks. He was a trustee of the Hudson–Fulton Commission and chairman of the committee on public health and convenience of the Hudson–Fulton Celebration. In 1889, he married Alice A. Day of Upper Lislie. They had a son, George Curtis.

Porter died at his home in Upper Lislie on August 11, 1929. He was buried in Upper Lislie Cemetery.
