= Agricultural policy =

Laws relating to domestic agriculture and foreign-imported agricultural products

Agricultural policy describes a set of laws relating to domestic agriculture and imports of foreign agricultural products. Governments usually implement agricultural policies with the goal of achieving a specific outcome in the domestic agricultural product markets. Well designed agricultural policies use predetermined goals, objectives and pathways set by an individual or government for the purpose of achieving a specified outcome, for the benefit of the individual(s), society and the nations' economy at large. The goals could include issues such as biosecurity, food security, rural poverty reduction or increasing economic value through cash crop or improved food distribution or food processing.

Agricultural policies take into consideration the primary (production), secondary (such as food processing, and distribution) and tertiary processes (such as consumption and supply in agricultural products and supplies). Outcomes can involve, for example, a guaranteed supply level, price stability, product quality, product selection, land use or employment. Governments can use tools like rural development practices, agricultural extension, economic protections, agricultural subsidies or price controls to change the dynamics of agricultural production, or improve the consumer impacts of the production.

Agricultural policy has wide reaching primary and secondary effects. Agriculture has large impacts on climate change, with land use, land-use change, and forestry estimated to be contributing 13–21% of global annual emissions as of the 2010s. Moreover, agricultural policy needs to account for a lot of shocks to the system: for example, agriculture is highly vulnerable to the negative impacts of climate change, such as decreases in water access, geophysical processes such as ocean level rise and changing weather, and socioeconomic processes that affect farmers, many of whom are in subsistence economic conditions. In order for global climate change mitigation and adaptation to be effective a wide range of policies need to be implemented to reduce the risk of negative climate change impacts on agriculture and greenhouse gas emissions from the agriculture sector. (Note: Current climate change policies are described in "Seventh National Communications - Annex I". United Nations Climate Change. and "National Communication submissions from Non-Annex I Parties". United Nations Climate Change.)

== Agriculture policy concerns ==
An example of the breadth and types of agriculture policy concerns can be found in the Australian Bureau of Agricultural and Resource Economics article "Agricultural Economies of Australia and New Zealand" which says that the major challenges and issues faced by their industrial agriculture industry are:

- marketing challenges and consumer tastes
- international trading environment (world market conditions, barriers to trade, quarantine and technical barriers, maintenance of global competitiveness and market image, and management of biosecurity issues affecting imports and the disease status of exports)
- biosecurity (pests and diseases such as bovine spongiform encephalopathy (BSE), avian influenza, foot and mouth disease, citrus canker, and sugarcane smut)
- infrastructure (such as transport, ports, telecommunications, energy and irrigation facilities)
- management skills and labor supply (With increasing requirements for business planning, enhanced market awareness, the use of modern technology such as computers and global positioning systems and better agronomic management, modern farm managers will need to become increasingly skilled. Examples: training of skilled workers, the development of labor hire systems that provide continuity of work in industries with strong seasonal peaks, modern communication tools, investigating market opportunities, researching customer requirements, business planning including financial management, researching the latest farming techniques, risk management skills)
- coordination (a more consistent national strategic agenda for agricultural research and development; more active involvement of research investors in collaboration with research providers developing programs of work; greater coordination of research activities across industries, research organisations and issues; and investment in human capital to ensure a skilled pool of research personnel in the future.)
- technology (research, adoption, productivity, genetically modified (GM) crops, investments)
- water (access rights, water trade, providing water for environmental outcomes, assignment of risk in response to the reallocation of water from consumptive to environmental use, accounting for the sourcing and allocation of water)
- resource access issues (management of native vegetation, the protection and enhancement of biodiversity, sustainability of productive agricultural resources, and landholder responsibilities)

=== Poverty reduction ===
Policymakers working in poverty reduction in the agriculture sector assess, plan, or enact policies aimed to address the needs of persons living in poverty. Agriculture has been a critical driver of poverty reduction in most developing countries, particularly in rural areas. Approximately 80% of the world's impoverished population, who primarily reside in rural areas and earn their livelihood through farming, can benefit from agriculture in terms of poverty reduction, income generation, and food security. Fostering agricultural development is therefore a crucial element of agricultural policy in a developing country. In addition, a recent Natural Resource Perspective paper by the Overseas Development Institute found that good infrastructure, education and effective information services in rural areas were necessary to improve the chances of making agriculture work for the poor.

During the 1980s and 1990s, there was a disregard for the agriculture sector among policymakers and investors, only regaining interest when the prices of staple food crops experienced a significant increase in the mid-2000s. As a result of agricultural policy neglect, there has been a scarcity of investment in infrastructure, which has hindered agricultural development and public goods, such as education, research and development and technology. Rural productive sectors and small agricultural enterprises suffer from market failures due to policies favouring urban areas and lending policies biased against small-scale agricultural firms. Neglect in implementing agriculture policy has been detected in several developing countries. In Indonesia, since the 1997 Asian financial crisis, the government's agricultural policy has been closely concentrated on achieving price stability and self-sufficiency for import-competing commodities, such as palm oil, sugar and rice.

International agencies such as the Food and Agriculture Organization (FAO), the World Bank, the International Fund for Agricultural Development (IFAD) and the Organisation for Economic Co-operation and Development (OECD), espouse the prioritisation of agricultural endeavours to support poverty reduction. The impact of agricultural policy on reducing poverty differs across countries and is influenced by a variety of factors, such as the level of government policy support, the degree of public and private investment in agriculture, the different types of agriculture, and the growth rates of agriculture parallel to non-agriculture sectors. In particular, investment in agricultural research and development has been shown to be highly influential on agricultural GDP growth and poverty reduction. Government policies play a key role in promoting agricultural activities, such as irrigation systems, roads and telecommunication systems, land reform, power in rural areas, fiscal support for research and development, pricing policies, assistance for new technologies, and markets for agricultural produce. Agricultural policies have contributed to meeting the goals related to increasing, diversifying, and improving agricultural production.

Agricultural policies aimed at reducing poverty include India's Pradhan Mantri Fasal Bima Yojana, which offers crop insurance to farmers to protect them from weather-related uncertainties and potential crop failures. This initiative provides farmers with financial aid for crop loss, reducing the risk of falling into poverty. Rwanda's Crop Intensification Program is another example of such policy, which provides farmers with inputs like fertilisers, improved seeds, and pesticides, as well as training and technical support to help them adopt more efficient farming practices. However, for agricultural policies to contribute to poverty reduction, it is essential that they collaborate effectively and cohesively with other sectors, such as tourism, sustainable economy, and industry.

=== Biosecurity ===
The biosecurity concerns facing industrial agriculture can be illustrated by:

- the threat to poultry and humans from H5N1; possibly caused by the use of animal vaccines
- the threat to cattle and humans from bovine spongiform encephalopathy (BSE); possibly caused by the unnatural feeding of cattle to cattle to minimize costs
- the threat to industry profits from diseases like foot-and-mouth disease and citrus canker which increasing globalization makes harder to contain

==== Avian influenza ====
The use of animal vaccines can create new viruses that kill people and cause flu pandemic threats. H5N1 is an example of where this might have already occurred. According to the CDC article "H5N1 Outbreaks and Enzootic Influenza" by Robert G. Webster et al.: "Transmission of highly pathogenic H5N1 from domestic poultry back to migratory waterfowl in western China has increased the geographic spread. The spread of H5N1 and its likely reintroduction to domestic poultry increase the need for good agricultural vaccines. In fact, the root cause of the continuing H5N1 pandemic threat may be the way the pathogenicity of H5N1 viruses is masked by co-circulating influenza viruses or bad agricultural vaccines." Robert Webster explains: "If you use a good vaccine you can prevent the transmission within poultry and to humans. But if they have been using vaccines now [in China] for several years, why is there so much bird flu? There is bad vaccine that stops the disease in the bird but the bird goes on pooping out the virus and maintaining it and changing it. And I think this is what is going on in China. It has to be. Either there is not enough vaccine being used or there is substandard vaccine being used. Probably both. It's not just China. We can't blame China for substandard vaccines. I think there are substandard vaccines for influenza in poultry all over the world."

In response to the same concerns, Reuters reports Hong Kong infectious disease expert Lo Wing-lok indicating that vaccines have to take top priority. Julie Hall, who is in charge of the WHO's outbreak response in China, claimed that China's vaccinations might be masking the virus. The BBC reported that Wendy Barclay, a virologist at the University of Reading, UK said: "The Chinese have made a vaccine based on reverse genetics made with H5N1 antigens, and they have been using it. There has been a lot of criticism of what they have done because they have protected their chickens against death from this virus but the chickens still get infected, and then you get the drift - the virus mutates in response to the antibodies - and now we have a situation where we have five or six 'flavours' of H5N1 out there."

==== Bovine spongiform encephalopathy ====
Bovine spongiform encephalopathy (BSE), commonly known as "mad cow disease", is a fatal, neurodegenerative disease of cattle, which infects by a mechanism that surprised biologists upon its discovery in the late 20th century. In the UK, the country worst affected, 179,000 cattle were infected and 4.4 million were killed as a precaution. The disease can be transmitted to human beings who eat or inhale material from infected carcasses. In humans, it is known as new variant Creutzfeldt–Jakob disease (vCJD or nvCJD), and by June 2007, it had killed 165 people in Britain, and six elsewhere with the number expected to rise because of the disease's long incubation period. Between 460,000 and 482,000 BSE-infected animals had entered the human food chain before controls on high-risk offal were introduced in 1989.

A British inquiry into BSE concluded that the epidemic was caused by feeding cattle, who are normally herbivores, the remains of other cattle in the form of meat and bone meal (MBM), which caused the infectious agent to spread. The origin of the disease itself remains unknown. The current scientific view is that infectious proteins called prions developed through spontaneous mutation, probably in the 1970s, and there is a possibility that the use of organophosphorus pesticides increased the susceptibility of cattle to the disease. The infectious agent is distinctive for the high temperatures it is able to survive; this contributed to the spread of the disease in Britain, which had reduced the temperatures used during its rendering process. Another contributory factor was the feeding of infected protein supplements to very young calves instead of milk from their mothers.

==== Foot-and-mouth disease ====
Foot-and-mouth disease is a highly contagious and sometimes fatal viral disease of cattle and pigs. It can also infect deer, goats, sheep, and other bovids with cloven hooves, as well as elephants, rats, and hedgehogs. Humans are affected only very rarely. FMD occurs throughout much of the world, and while some countries have been free of FMD for some time, its wide host range and rapid spread represent cause for international concern. In 1996, endemic areas included Asia, Africa, and parts of South America. North America, Australia, New Zealand and Japan have been free of FMD for many years. Most European countries have been recognized as free, and countries belonging to the European Union have stopped FMD vaccination.

Infection with foot-and-mouth disease tends to occur locally, that is, the virus is passed on to susceptible animals through direct contact with infected animals or with contaminated pens or vehicles used to transport livestock. The clothes and skin of animal handlers such as farmers, standing water, and uncooked food scraps and feed supplements containing infected animal products can harbor the virus as well. Cows can also catch FMD from the semen of infected bulls. Control measures include quarantine and destruction of infected livestock, and export bans for meat and other animal products to countries not infected with the disease.

Because FMD rarely infects humans but spreads rapidly among animals, it is a much greater threat to the agriculture industry than to human health. Farmers around the world can lose huge amounts of money during a foot-and-mouth epidemic, when large numbers of animals are destroyed and revenues from milk and meat production go down. One of the difficulties in vaccinating against FMD is the huge variation between and even within serotypes. There is no cross-protection between serotypes (meaning that a vaccine for one serotype won't protect against any others) and in addition, two strains within a given serotype may have nucleotide sequences that differ by as much as 30% for a given gene. This means that FMD vaccines must be highly specific to the strain involved. Vaccination only provides temporary immunity that lasts from months to years. Therefore, rich countries maintain a policy of banning imports from all countries, not proven FMD-free by US or EU standards. This is a point of contention.

Although this disease is not dangerous to humans and rarely fatal to otherwise healthy animals, it reduces milk and meat production. Outbreaks can be stopped quickly if farmers and transporters are forced to abide by existing rules. Therefore, (besides temporary discomfort to the animals), any outbreak in the rich world should not be much more as a localized, cyclical economic problem. For countries with free roaming wildlife it is nearly impossible to prove that they are entirely free of this disease. If they try they are forced to erect nationwide fences, which destroys wildlife migration. Because detecting and reporting of FMD have enormously improved and sped up, almost all poor countries could now safely create FMD-free export zones. But rich countries refuse to change the rules. In effect, many poor tropical countries have no chance to meet current rules, so they are still today banned from exporting meat, even if many of them are FMD-free.

The result is that if drought hits, the poor try to cope by selling their few animals. This quickly saturates regional demand. The export ban then destroys the value of these animals, in effect destroying the most important coping mechanism of several hundreds of millions extremely poor households. The rules around meat exports have been changed many times, always to accommodate changing circumstances in rich countries, usually further reducing meat export chances for poor countries. For that reason, Kanya and many other countries find the rules very unjust. They are however discouraged to file a formal complaint with WTO by diplomats from rich countries.

==== Citrus canker ====
Citrus canker is a disease affecting citrus species that is caused by the bacterium Xanthomonas axonopodis. The infection causes lesions on the leaves, stems, and fruit of citrus trees, including lime, oranges, and grapefruit. While not harmful to humans, canker significantly affects the vitality of citrus trees, causing leaves and fruit to drop prematurely; a fruit infected with canker is safe to eat but too unsightly to be sold. The disease, which is believed to have originated in South East Asia, is extremely persistent when it becomes established in an area, making it necessary for all citrus orchards to be destroyed for the successful eradication of the disease. Australia, Brazil and the United States are currently experiencing canker outbreaks.

The disease can be detected in orchards and on fruit by the appearance of lesions. Early detection is critical in quarantine situations. Bacteria are tested for pathogenicity by inoculating multiple citrus species with the bacterium. Simultaneously, other diagnostic tests (antibody detection, fatty-acid profiling, and genetic procedures using PCR) are conducted to identify the particular canker strain. Citrus canker outbreaks are prevented and managed in a number of ways. In countries that do not have canker, the disease is prevented from entering the country by quarantine measures. In countries with new outbreaks, eradication programs that are started soon after the disease has been discovered have been successful; such programs rely on the destruction of affected orchards. When eradication has been unsuccessful and the disease has become established, management options include replacing susceptible citrus cultivars with resistant cultivars, applying preventive sprays of copper-based bactericides, and destroying infected trees and all surrounding trees within an appropriate radius.

The citrus industry is the largest fresh-fruit exporting industry in Australia. Australia has had three outbreaks of citrus canker; all three were successfully eradicated. The disease was found twice during the 1900s in the Northern Territory and was eradicated each time. During the first outbreak in 1912, every citrus tree north of latitude 19° south was destroyed, taking 11 years to eradicate the disease. In 2004, Asiatic citrus canker was detected in an orchard in Emerald, Queensland, and was thought to have occurred from the illegal import of infected citrus plants. The state and federal governments have ordered that all commercial orchards, all non-commercial citrus trees, and all native lime trees (C. glauca) in the vicinity of Emerald be destroyed rather than trying to isolate infected trees.

=== Food security ===
The United Nations Food and Agriculture Organization (FAO) defines food security as existing when "all people, at all times, have physical and economic access to sufficient safe and nutritious food that meets their dietary needs and food preferences for an active and healthy life". The four qualifications that must be met for a food secure system include physical availability, economic and physical access, appropriate utilization, and stability of the prior three elements over time.

Of the 6.7 billion people on the planet, about 2 billion are food insecure. As the global population grows to 9 billion by 2050, and as diets shift to emphasize higher energy products and greater overall consumption, food systems will be subjected to even greater pressure. Climate change presents additional threats to food security, affecting crop yields, distribution of pests and diseases, weather patterns, and growing seasons around the world.

Food security has thus become an increasingly important topic in agricultural policy as decision makers attempt to reduce poverty and malnutrition while augmenting adaptive capacity to climate change. The Commission on Sustainable Agriculture and Climate Change listed high-priority policy actions to address food security, including integrating food security and sustainable agriculture into global and national policies, significantly raising the level of global investment in food systems, and developing specific programs and policies to support the most vulnerable populations (namely, those that are already subject to food insecurity).

=== Food sovereignty ===
'Food sovereignty', a term coined by members of Via Campesina in 1996, is about the right of peoples to define their own food systems. Advocates of food sovereignty put the people who produce, distribute, and consume food at the centre of decisions on food systems and policies, rather than the demands of markets and corporations that they believe have come to dominate the global food system. This movement is advocated by a number of farmers, peasants, pastoralists, fisherfolk, indigenous peoples, women, rural youth, and environmental organizations.

== Policy tools ==
An agricultural subsidy is a governmental subsidy paid to farmers and agribusinesses to manage the agricultural industry as one part of the various methods a government uses in a mixed economy. The conditions for payment and the reasons for the individual specific subsidies vary with farm product, size of the farm, nature of ownership, and country among other factors. Enriching peanut farmers for political purposes, keeping the price of a staple low to keep the poor from rebelling, stabilizing the production of a crop to avoid famine years, encouraging diversification and many other purposes have been suggested as the reason for specific subsidies.

Price floors or price ceilings set a minimum or maximum price for a product. Price controls encourage more production by a price floor or less production by a price ceiling. A government can erect trade barriers to limit the number of goods imported (in the case of a Quota Share) or enact tariffs to raise the domestic price of imported products. These barriers give preference to domestic producers.

== Objectives of market intervention ==
=== National security ===
Some argue that nations have an interest in assuring there is sufficient domestic production capability to meet domestic needs in the event of a global supply disruption. Significant dependence on foreign food producers makes a country strategically vulnerable in the event of war, blockade or embargo. Maintaining adequate domestic capability allows for food self-sufficiency that lessens the risk of supply shocks due to geopolitical events. Agricultural policies may be used to support domestic producers as they gain domestic and international market share. This may be a short term way of encouraging an industry until it is large enough to thrive without aid. Or it may be an ongoing subsidy designed to allow a product to compete with or undercut the foreign competition. This may produce a net gain for a government despite the cost of interventions because it allows a country to build up an export industry or reduce imports. It also helps to form the nation's supply and demand market.

=== Environmental protection and land management ===
Farm or undeveloped land composes the majority of land in most countries. Policies may encourage some land uses rather than others in the interest of protecting the environment. For instance, subsidies may be given for particular farming methods, forestation, land clearance, or pollution abatement.

=== Rural poverty and poverty relief ===
Subsidising farming may encourage people to remain on the land and obtain some income. This might be relevant to an agrarian country with many peasant farmers, but it may also be a consideration to more developed countries such as Poland. It has a very high unemployment rate, much farmland and retains a large rural population growing food for their own use.

Price controls may also be used to assist poor citizens. Many countries have used this method of welfare support as it delivers cheap food to the poorest in urban areas without the need to assess people to give them financial aid. This often goes at the cost of the rural poor, who then earn less from what is often their only realistic or potential source of income: agriculture. Because in almost all countries the rural poor are poorer than the urban poor, cheap food policies through price controls often increase overall poverty.

The same often counts for poverty relief in the form of food aid, which (unless while during severe drought) drives small producers in poor countries out of production. It tends to benefit lower middle class groups (sub-urban and urban poor) at the expense of the poorest 20 percent, who as a result remain deprived of customers.

=== Organic farming assistance ===
Welfare economics theory holds that sometimes private activities can impose social costs upon others. Industrial agriculture is widely considered to impose social costs through pesticide pollution and nitrate pollution. Further, agriculture uses large amounts of water, a scarce resource. Some economists argue that taxes should be levied on agriculture, or that organic agriculture, which uses little pesticides and experiences relatively little nitrate runoff, should be encouraged with subsidies. In the United States, 65% of the approximately $16.5 billion in annual subsidies went to the top 10% of farmers in 2002 because subsidies are linked to certain commodities. On the other hand, organic farming received $5 million for help in certification and $15 million for research over a 5-year time period.

=== Fair trade ===
Some advocate Fair Trade rules to ensure that poor farmers in developing nations that produce crops primarily for export are not exploited or negatively impacted by trade policies, practices, tariffs, and agreements which benefit one competitor at the expense of another - which advocates consider a dangerous "race to the bottom" in agricultural labor and safety standards. Opponents point out that most agriculture in developed nations is produced by industrial corporations (agribusiness) which are hardly deserving of sympathy, and that the alternative to exploitation is poverty.

Fair trade steak? Much of what developing countries export to the rich world, also comes from industrial corporations. The reason for that is, that rich countries have put up elaborate quality demands, most of whom make no factual health contribution. Small farmers often in effect meet these demands, but are rarely able to prove that in western standards. Therefore, the biggest impediment to the growth of small farming and therefore of fair trade in sectors beyond coffee and bananas, is these quality demands from the rich world.

== Arguments against market intervention ==
=== Dumping of agricultural surpluses ===
In international trade parlance, when a company from country A sells a commodity below the cost of production into country B, this is called "dumping". A number of countries that are signatories to multilateral trade agreements have provisions that prohibit this practice. When rich countries subsidize domestic production, the excess output is often given to the developing world as foreign aid. This process eliminates the domestic market for agricultural products in the developing world because the products can be obtained for free from western aid agencies. In developing nations where these effects are most severe, small farmers could no longer afford basic inputs and were forced to sell their land.

"Consider a farmer in Ghana who used to be able to make a living growing rice. Several years ago, Ghana was able to feed and export their surplus. Now, it imports rice. From where? Developed countries. Why? Because it's cheaper. Even if it costs the rice producer in the developed world much more to produce the rice, he doesn't have to make a profit from his crop. The government pays him to grow it, so he can sell it more cheaply to Ghana than the farmer in Ghana can. And that farmer in Ghana? He can't feed his family anymore." (Lyle Vanclief, former Canadian Minister of Agriculture [1997-2003])

According to the Institute for Agriculture and Trade Policy, corn, soybeans, cotton, wheat and rice are sold below the cost of production, or dumped. Dumping rates are approximately forty percent for wheat, between twenty-five and thirty percent for corn (maize), approximately thirty percent for soybeans, fifty-seven percent for cotton, and approximately twenty percent for rice. For example, wheat is sold for forty percent below cost.

According to Oxfam, "If developed nations eliminated subsidy programs, the export value of agriculture in lesser developed nations would increase by 24 %, plus a further 5.5 % from tariff equilibrium. ... exporters can offer US surpluses for sale at prices around half the cost of production; destroying local agriculture and creating a captive market in the process." Free trade advocates desire the elimination of all market distorting mechanisms (subsidies, tariffs, regulations) and argue that, as with free trade in all areas, this will result in aggregate benefit for all. This position is particularly popular in competitive agricultural exporting nations in both the developed and developing world, some of whom have banded together in the Cairns Group lobby. Canada's Department of Agriculture estimates that developing nations would benefit by about $4 billion annually if subsidies in the developed world were halved.

=== Agricultural independence ===
Many developing countries do not grow enough food to feed their own populations. These nations must buy food from other countries. Lower prices and free food save the lives of millions of starving people, despite the drop in food sales of the local farmers. A developing nation could use new improved farming methods to grow more food, with the ultimate goal of feeding their nation without outside help. New greenhouse methods, hydroponics, fertilizers, R/O water processors, hybrid crops, fast-growing hybrid trees for quick shade, interior temperature control, greenhouse or tent insulation, autonomous building gardens, sun lamps, mylar, fans, and other cheap tech can be used to grow crops on previously unarable land, such as rocky, mountainous, desert, and even Arctic lands. More food can be grown, reducing dependency on other countries for food.

Replacement crops can also make nations agriculturally independent. Sugar, for example, comes from sugar cane imported from Polynesia. Instead of buying the sugar from Polynesia, a nation can make sugar from sugar beets, maple sap, or sweetener from stevia plant, keeping the profits circulating within the nation's economy. Paper and clothes can be made of hemp instead of trees and cotton. Tropical foods won't grow in many places in Europe, but they will grow in insulated greenhouses or tents in Europe. Soybean plant cellulose can replace plastic (made from oil). Ethanol from farm waste or hempseed oil can replace gasoline. Rainforest medicine plants grown locally can replace many imported medicines. Alternates of cash crops, like sugar and oil replacements, can reduce farmers' dependency on subsidies in both developed and developing nations.

Market interventions may increase the cost to consumers for agricultural products, either via hidden wealth-transfers via the government, or increased prices at the consumer level, such as for sugar and peanuts in the US. This has led to market distortions, such as food processors using high fructose corn syrup as a replacement for sugar. High fructose corn syrup may be an unhealthy food additive, and, were sugar prices not inflated by government fiat, sugar might be preferred over high fructose corn syrup in the marketplace.

== Developed world cases ==
=== Agriculture policy design strategy and examples ===
The concerns of agricultural policies are extensive, and includes ensuring the hygiene of salads, globalization management, and other emerging issues. The majority of the concerns fall into three categories: food supply for a growing population, livelihood insurance for farmers, and environmental protection. The theme of all approaches aiming to address these 3 types of concerns is to have a holistic view of their effects and externalities (a by-product of an action that affects others without their consent), because some policies intended to address one aspect of the concerns may have unintended harmful consequences that worsen other aspects while some have zero or negative beneficial effects. For example, subsidizing agricultural companies allows them to expand their industry and offer their products at lower prices to customers, but increases the firm's water and land usage which are at the cost of natural habitats. From an opposite perspective, if we protect the natural habitats and tax the agricultural firm for turning natural lands into factories, the prices of their products increase, making the firm's products too expensive for some customers. These externalities and trade-offs put the policymakers in a dilemma because our current global agriculture system is vulnerable to many disruptions such as weather changes, locality, manpower shifts, etc. Consequently, before we resolve this primary fragility of our agriculture system. It's of high cruciality for policymakers to weigh the trade-offs and adopt the most appropriate policies.

There are examples of the agricultural policy design mentioned above that are made by worldwide unions, countries, and states. While every specific situation requires its own specific agricultural policy design, these examples can provide useful models, insights, and lessons for future policymakers' reference and inspiration. The Common Agricultural Policy, published by E.U., uses government subsidies to encourage food production and farming industrialization in its early stage. In some areas, food production boomed so much that enormous food waste became a new problem. With food waste, the market was thrown into imbalance. Consequently, the price drop cost the farmers' utility and has led to a future reform known as the Marsholt Plan. Marsholt Plan and following reforms generally adjusted the agriculture market back to balance. Later reforms managed to spread the fund to farmers and increase each individual farmers' welfare instead of merely expanding croplands and industries. Starting from 2003, the Common Agricultural Policy fund is further detailed into individuals and environmental protection is finally put into consideration.

=== Overview: Europe and America ===
The farmer population is approximately five percent of the total population in the E.U. and 1.7% in the U.S. The total value of agricultural production in the E.U. amounted to 128 billion euros (1998). About forty-nine percent of this amount was accounted for by political measures: 37 billion euros due to direct payments and 43 billion euros from consumers due to the artificially high price. Eighty percent of European farmers receive a direct payment of 5,000 euros or less, while 2.2% receive a direct payment above 50,000 euros, totaling forty percent of all direct subsidies.

The average U.S. farmer receives $16,000 in annual subsidies. Two-thirds of farmers receive no direct payments. Of those that do, the average amount amongst the lowest paid eighty percent was $7000 from 1995 to 2003. Subsidies are a mix of tax reductions, direct cash payments and below-market prices on water and other inputs. Some claim that these aggregate figures are misleading because large agribusinesses, rather than individual farmers, receive a significant share of total subsidy spending. The Federal Agriculture Improvement and Reform Act of 1996 reduced farm subsidies, providing fixed payments over a period and replacing price supports and subsidies. The Farm Security and Rural Investment Act of 2002 contains direct and countercyclical payments designed to limit the effects of low prices and yields.

In the EU, €54 billion of subsidies are paid every year. An increasing share of the subsidies is being decoupled from production and lumped into the Single Farm Payment. While this has diminished the distortions created by the Common Agricultural Policy, many critics argue that a greater focus on the provision of public goods, such as biodiversity and clean water, is needed. The next major reform is expected for 2014 when a new long-term EU budget is coming into effect.

=== Environmental programs ===
The U.S. Conservation Reserve Program leases land from producers that take marginal land out of production and convert it back to a near-natural state by planting native grasses and other plants. The U.S. Environmental Quality Incentives Program subsidizes improvements which promote water conservation and other measures. This program is conducted under a bidding process using a formula where farmers request a certain percentage of cost share for improvement such as drip irrigation. Producers that offer the most environmental improvement based on a point system for the least cost are funded first. The process continues until that year's allocated funds are expended.

== World Trade Organization actions ==
In April 2004 the World Trade Organization (WTO) ruled that 3 billion dollars in US cotton subsidies violate trade agreements and that almost 50% of EU sugar exports are illegal. In 1997–2003, US cotton exports were subsidized by an average of 48%. The WTO has extracted commitments from the Philippines government, making it lower import barriers to half their present levels over a span of six years, and allowing in drastically increased competition from the industrialised and heavily subsidised farming systems of North America and Europe. A recent Oxfam report estimated that average household incomes of maize farmers will be reduced by as much as 30% over the six years as cheap imports from the US drive down prices in the local markets. The report estimates that in the absence of trade restrictions, US subsidised maize could be marketed at less than half the price of maize grown on the Philippine island of Mindanao; and that the livelihoods of up to half a million Filipino maize farmers (out of the total 1.2 million) are under immediate threat.

== See also ==
- Agricultural economics
- Common Agricultural Policy
- Corn Laws
- Food price crisis
- Land reform
- Mixed economy
- Trade and development
- Trade barriers
