= Buffer initiative =

In the United States the Buffer Initiative was an initiative led by the Natural Resources Conservation Service, with numerous partners, and started in 1997 to enroll 2 million miles (up to 7 million acres (28,000 km^{2})) in conservation buffers by 2002, using the Conservation Reserve Program's continuous enrollment option, and drawing on the resources of several other agricultural conservation programs, including EQIP, Wildlife Habitat Incentive Program, Wetlands Reserve Program, and Emergency Watershed Protection Program.

== See also ==
- Agricultural policy of the United States
