= Classified pricing =

Classified pricing is the pricing system of federal milk marketing orders, under which milk processors pay into a pool for fluid grade (Grade A) milk. The price that processors have to pay into the pool is based on how the milk ultimately is used. Milk used for fluid (Class I) consumption generally receives the highest price and lower minimum prices are paid for the three classes of milk used for manufactured dairy products: Class II (yogurt, cottage cheese, ice cream, and other soft manufactured products), Class III (cheese), and Class IV (butter and nonfat dry milk).
