= Urceolaria =

Scientific classification
- Kingdom: Fungi
- Division: Ascomycota
- Class: Lecanoromycetes
- Order: Pertusariales
- Family: Megasporaceae
- Genus: Urceolaria; Bonord.

Type species
- Urceolaria agelaea (Ach.) Ach.

Genus of fungi

Urceolaria is a genus of fungi in the Pezizales order. The relationship of this taxon to other taxa within the order is unknown (incertae sedis), and it has not yet been placed with certainty into any family. The genus was described by the German mycologist Hermann Friedrich Bonorden in 1851. According to the Dictionary of the Fungi (10th edition, 2008), the genus contains about 100 species.
