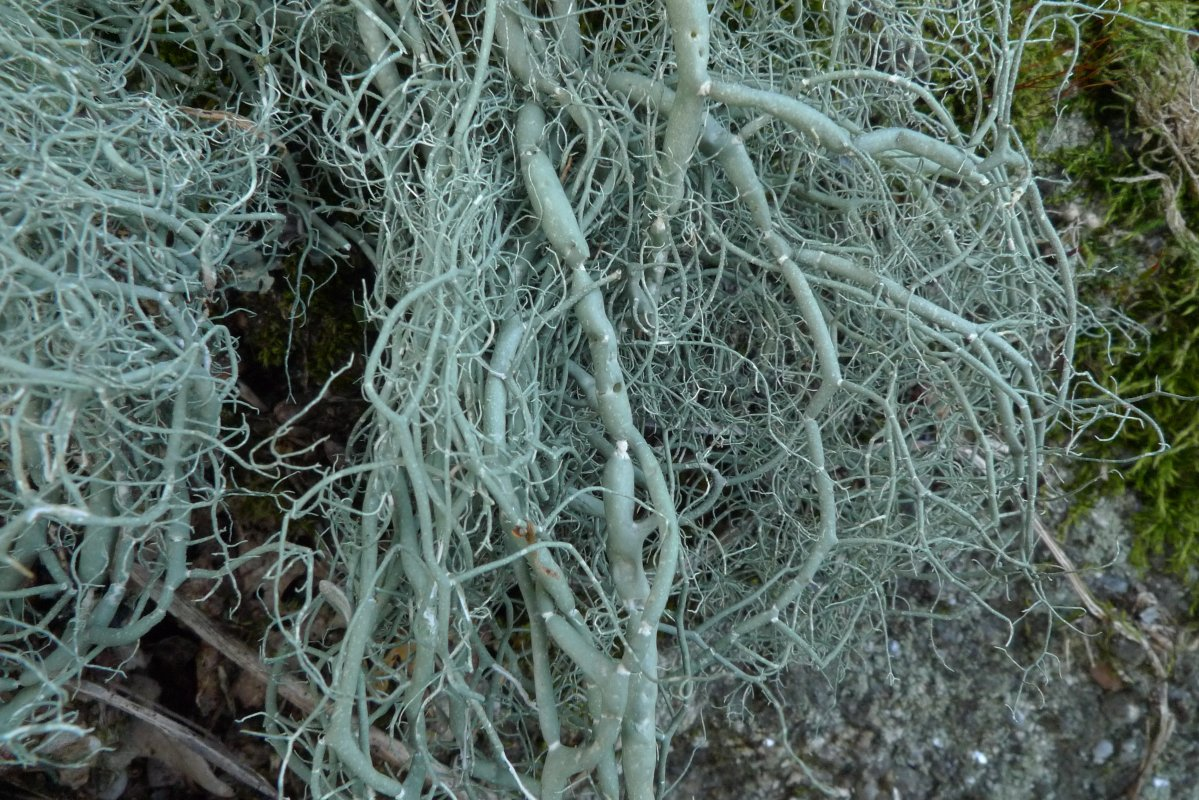

Scientific classification
- Kingdom: Fungi
- Division: Ascomycota
- Class: Lecanoromycetes
- Order: Lecanorales
- Family: Parmeliaceae
- Genus: Usnea
- Species: U. articulata

Binomial name
- Usnea articulata (L.) Hoffm. (1796)

= Usnea articulata =

Species of lichen

Usnea articulata, commonly known as the string-of-sausage lichen, is a pale greenish-grey, densely branched lichen with a prostrate or pendant growth form. It grows on bark, on branches and twigs, and is often unattached to a branch and merely draped over it. It grows up to 100 cm (40 in) in length.

== Description ==
The thallus (vegetative tissue) of this fruticose (bush-like) lichen is densely branched, and forms tangled masses of stems which are prostrate or pendulous. The branches are smooth and somewhat knobbly or spiny, and a greenish-grey colour. The larger stems become articulated, dividing into inflated, sausage-like segments. The lichen is not blackish at the base and sometimes becomes detached, continuing to grow while draped over its support.

== Distribution and habitat ==
This lichen is very sensitive to air pollution, especially from sulphur dioxide; it has a widespread but sparse distribution in mainland Europe, but has become extinct in many areas, surviving best in Brittany. It occurs on various Mediterranean and Atlantic islands and is present in Saudi Arabia, and the mountainous regions of East Africa and North Africa. In the British Isles, it used to be widespread but disappeared from many areas during the Industrial Revolution. It is reasonably common in southwestern England, from the New Forest westwards, and is known from scattered locations in Wales, particularly Pembrokeshire. It is rare in southern and western Ireland.

Sometimes this lichen grows on the ground, in the slacks among sand dunes growing over rough vegetation. More often it is arboreal, often high in the canopy or in hedgerows, and not attached to anything, but draped over twigs and branches. Here it is difficult to spot from below and its presence may only become apparent should fragments of the lichen fall to the ground during storms or after snowfall.

== Ecology ==
Like all lichens, this species involves a mutual relationship between an alga and a fungus; in this instance the alga is a green alga, but not Trentepohlia. Reproduction in this species is mainly by fragmentation of the thallus, with an apparent absence of spore production limiting its ability to recolonise parts of its range where it has been extirpated.

== See also ==
- List of lichens named by Carl Linnaeus
- List of Usnea species
