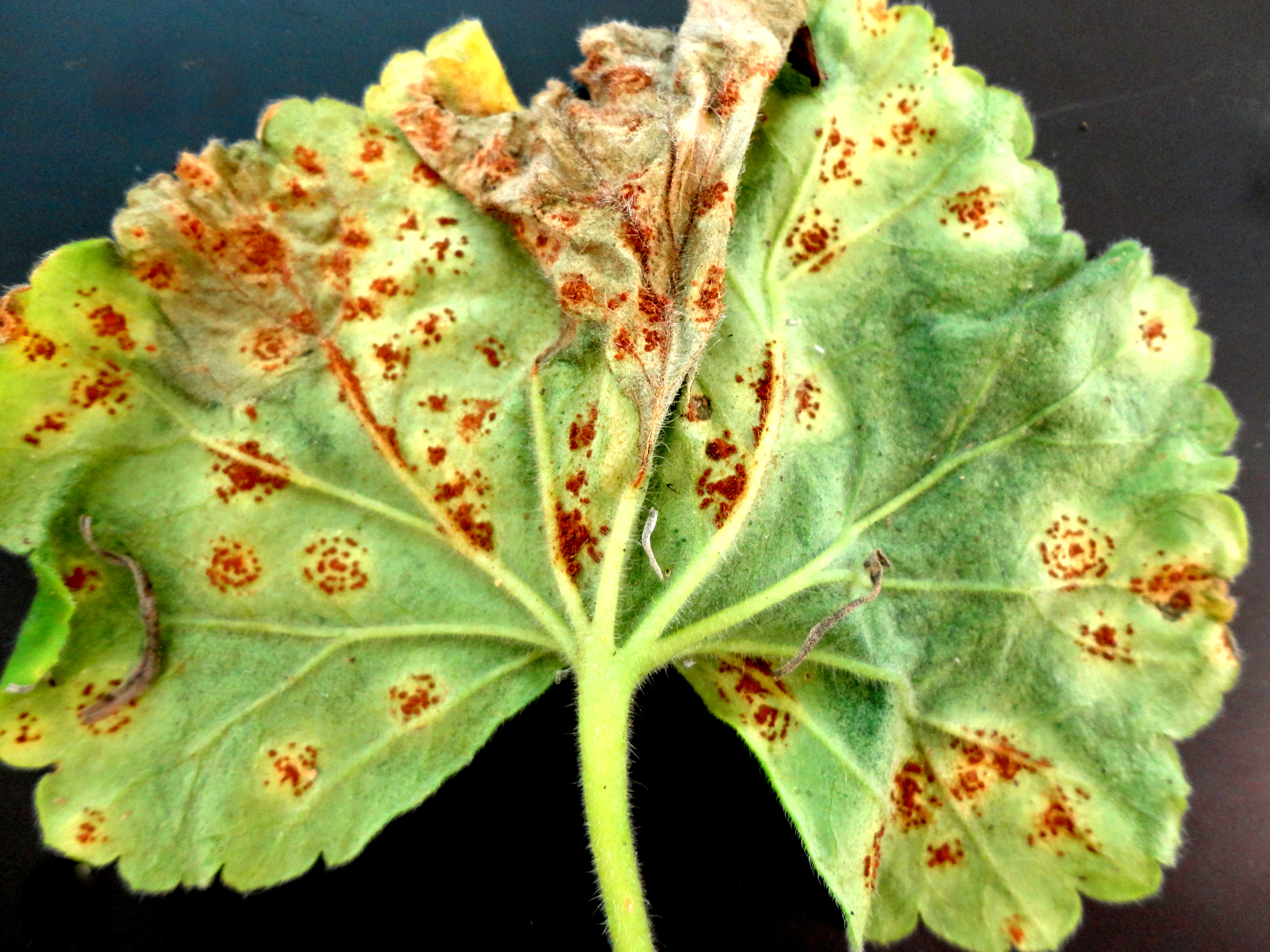
- Rust pustules on the underside of a geranium leaf
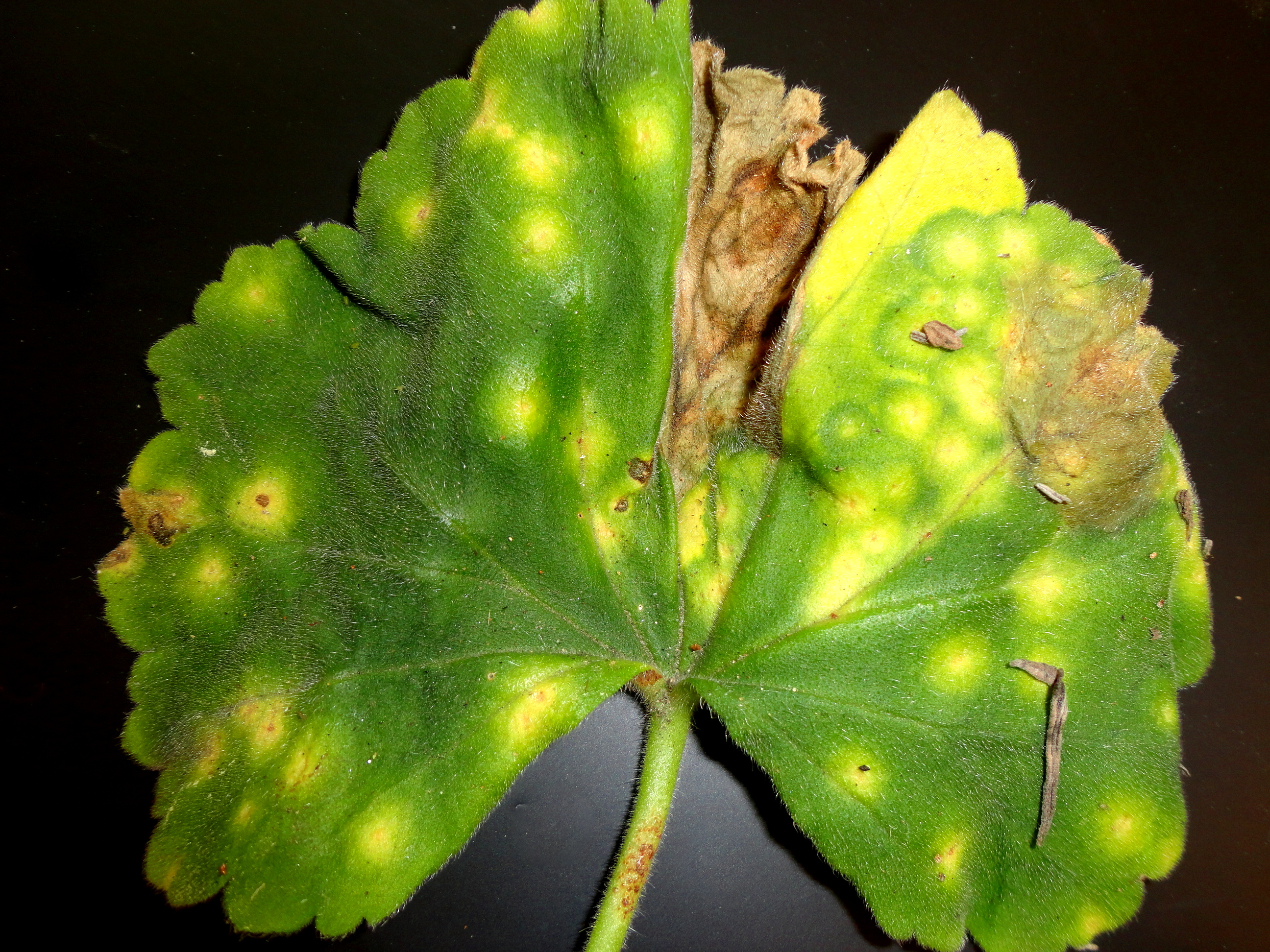
- Symptoms of rust infection on the upper side of a geranium leaf

Scientific classification
- Domain: Eukaryota
- Kingdom: Fungi
- Division: Basidiomycota
- Class: Pucciniomycetes
- Order: Pucciniales
- Family: Pucciniaceae
- Genus: Puccinia
- Species: P. pelargonii-zonalis

Binomial name
- Puccinia pelargonii-zonalis Doidge (1926)

Synonyms
- Aecidium violaceum Trel., (1904); Nigredo geranii (DC.) Arthur, (1926); Uredo geranii DC., (1806); Uromyces puccinioides Rabenh., (1851)

= Puccinia pelargonii-zonalis =

Species of fungus

Puccinia pelargonii-zonalis is a fungal species and plant pathogen that causes rust on Pelargonium geraniums. It was originally found on the leaves of Pelargonium zonale in KwaZulu-Natal, South Africa.

== See also ==
- List of Puccinia species
