= Stegocintractia junci =

Scientific classification
- Kingdom: Fungi
- Division: Basidiomycota
- Class: Ustilaginomycetes
- Order: Ustilaginales
- Family: Anthracoideaceae
- Genus: Stegocintractia
- Species: S. junci

Binomial name
- Stegocintractia junci (Schwein.) M.Piepenbr. (2000)

Synonyms
- Caeoma junci Schwein. (1832); Cintractia junci (Schwein.) Trel. Uromyces junci (Schwein.) Tul. & C.Tul ex Sacc. (1854)

Species of fungus

Stegocintractia junci is a species of fungus in the family Anthracoideaceae. It is a plant pathogen infecting species of the genus Juncus.
