= Agriculture Risk Protection Act of 2000 =

US federal agriculture legislation

- Other short titles: Agricultural Risk Protection Act of 1999
- Long title: An Act to amend the Federal Crop Insurance Act to strengthen the safety net for agricultural producers by providing greater access to more affordable risk management tools and improved protection from production and income loss, to improve the efficiency and integrity of the Federal crop insurance program.
- Enacted by: the 106th United States Congress
- Effective: June 22, 2000

Citations
- Public law: 106-224
- Statutes at Large: 114 Stat. 358

Legislative history
- Introduced in the House as H.R. 2559 by Larry Combest (R–TX) on July 20, 1999; Committee consideration by House Agriculture, Senate Agriculture, Nutrition, and Forestry; Passed the House on September 29, 1999 (422-1); Passed the Senate on March 23, 2000 (95-5); Reported by the joint conference committee on May 25, 2000; agreed to by the House on May 25, 2000 (voice vote) and by the Senate on May 25, 2000 (91-4); Signed into law by President Bill Clinton on June 22, 2000

The Agriculture Risk Protection Act of 2000 (Pub. L. 106–224 (text) (PDF)) made major revisions to the United States' federal crop insurance program and provided emergency agricultural assistance. The crop insurance provisions significantly increased the program's government subsidy; improved coverage for farmers affected by multiple years of natural disasters; and authorized pilot insurance programs for livestock farmers and growers of other farm commodities that were not served by crop insurance, among many other provisions. The emergency provisions made available a total of $7.14 billion in emergency farm assistance, mostly in direct payments (called market loss payments) to growers of various commodities to compensate for low farm commodity prices.

== See also ==
- Agricultural Management Assistance Program
