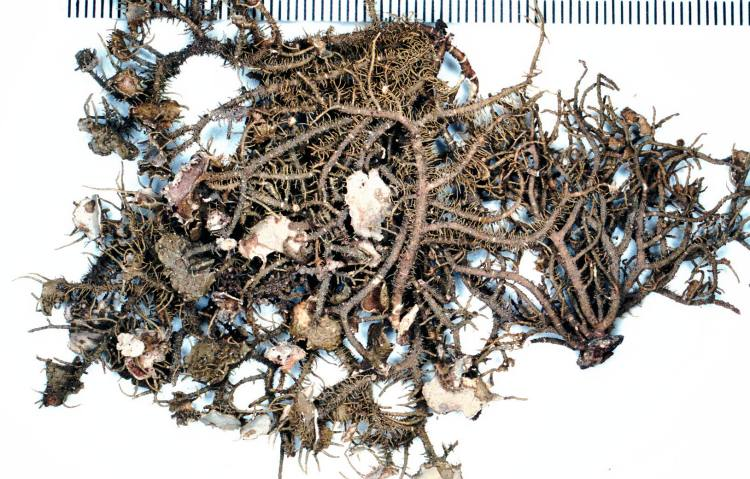

Conservation status
- Secure (NatureServe)

Scientific classification
- Kingdom: Fungi
- Division: Ascomycota
- Class: Lecanoromycetes
- Order: Lecanorales
- Family: Parmeliaceae
- Genus: Usnea
- Species: U. strigosa

Binomial name
- Usnea strigosa (Ach.) Pers. (1827)

Synonyms
- Usnea florida var. strigosa Ach. (1803)

= Usnea strigosa =

Bushy beard lichen

Species of lichen

Usnea strigosa, commonly known as bushy beard lichen, is a fruticose lichen in the family Parmeliaceae.

== Distribution ==
Usnea strigosa has worldwide distribution. It is a common tree lichen in Eastern and Southeastern North America.

== Description ==
This lichen is fruticose with 2 to 5 cm long branches and abundant terminal apothecia about 5 mm wide.

== Taxonomy ==
Usnea strigosa has three recognized subspecies, major, rubiginea, and strigosa. There are also several chemotypes, bringing the current taxonomy into doubt.

== Ecology ==
Usnea strigosa grows on trees. The most frequent hosts of this lichen are oak trees. The photosynthetic symbionts of Usnea species are Chlorophyta green algae.
