= Farm and Ranch Lands Protection Program =

Farm and Ranch Lands Protection Program (FRPP) — The Natural Resources Conservation Service (NRCS) renamed the Farmland Protection Program (FPP) to the Farm and Ranch Lands Protection Program in 2003 to accurately reflect the resources eligible to participate in the program. The program established by the 1996 farm bill (P.L. 104-127) to fund the purchase of conservation easements of 170,000-340,000 acres of land having prime or unique soil or other desirable production qualities that are threatened by urban development. Eligibility depends upon already having a pending offer from a state or local government to protect qualifying land by limiting nonagricultural use. The 2002 farm bill (P.L. 107-171, Sec. 1241) reauthorized the program through FY2007 and provided mandatory funding from the Commodity Credit Corporation (CCC) that was $50 million in FY2002 and will rise to $125 million in FY2004, then slowly decline to $97 million in FY2007. Other changes expanded the definition of eligible land to include cropland, rangeland, grassland, pasture land, incidental forest land, and historic and archeological sites; expanded the list of eligible participants to include Indian tribes and non profit organizations that meet specified qualifications; and directed an unspecified portion of the program funds to carry out a farm viability program. According to the NRCS FY2005 budget request document, more than 306,000 acres (1,240 km^{2}) in 42 states have or soon will have easement contracts.

The Farm and Ranch Lands Protection Program was repealed in 2014 by the 2014 Farm Bill and replaced by the Agricultural Conservation Easement Program. Approximately 631,235 acres of land were enrolled before repeal and are now permanently protected as a result of this program.
