= Sugarcane smut =

Species of fungus

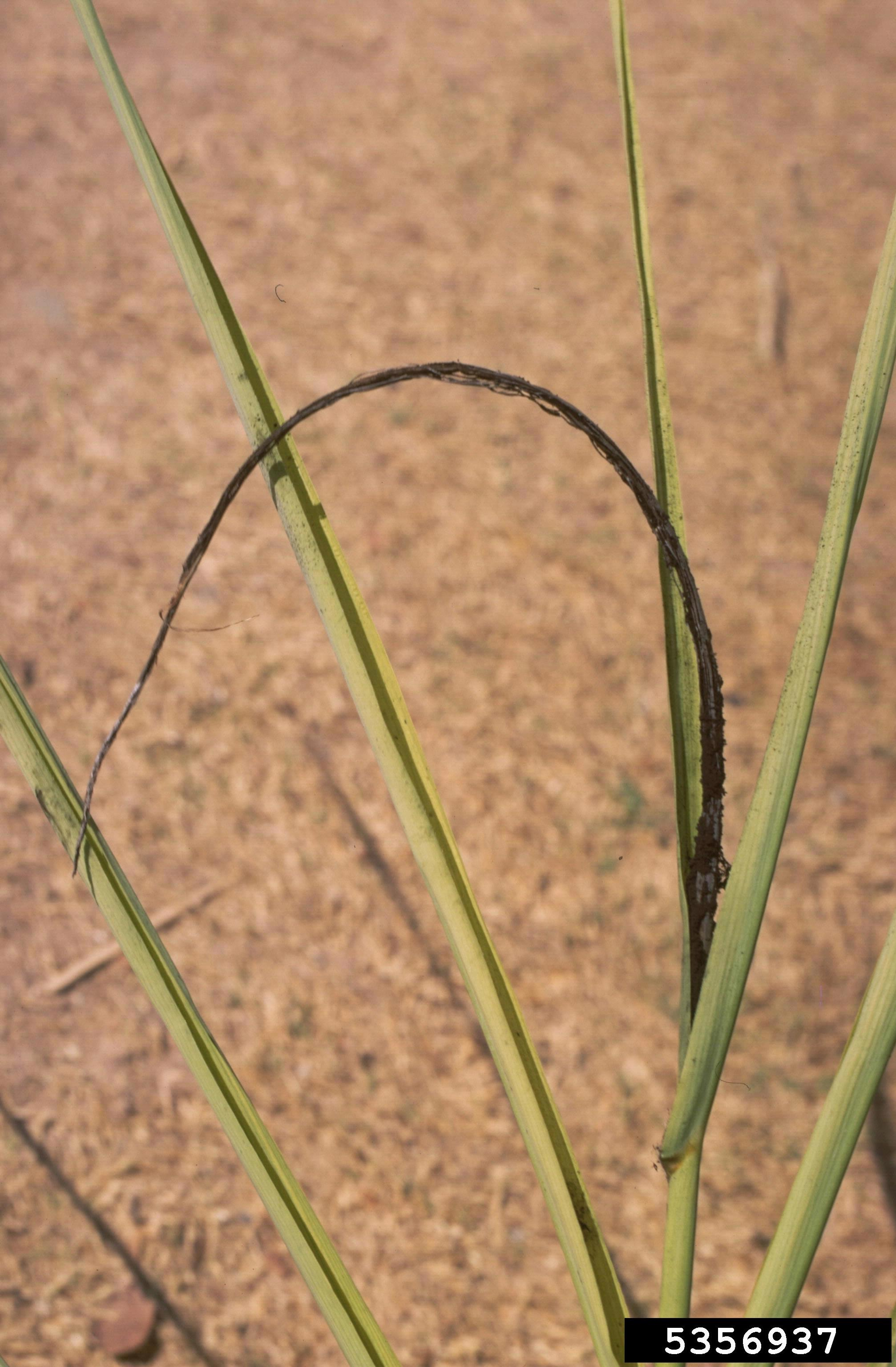
- The black whip produced by sugarcane smut
- Common names: smut of sugarcane
- Causal agents: Sporisorium scitamineum
- Hosts: sugarcane
- EPPO Code: USTISC

Sugarcane smut

Scientific classification
- Kingdom: Fungi
- Division: Basidiomycota
- Class: Ustilaginomycetes
- Order: Ustilaginales
- Family: Ustilaginaceae
- Genus: Sporisorium
- Species: S. scitamineum

Binomial name
- Sporisorium scitamineum (Syd.) M. Piepenbr., M. Stoll & Oberw. 2002

Synonyms
- Ustilago scitaminea Syd., 1924

Sugarcane smut is a fungal disease of sugarcane caused by the fungus Sporisorium scitamineum. The disease is known as culmicolous, which describes the outgrowth of fungus of the stalk on the cane. It attacks several sugarcane species and has been reported to occur on a few other grass species as well, but not to a critical amount. The most recognizable characteristic of this disease is a black or gray growth that is referred to as a "smut whip". Resistance to sugarcane smut is the best course of action for management, but also the use of disease free seed is important. On smaller scale operations treatments using hot water and removing infected plants can be effective. The main mode of spore dispersal is the wind but the disease also spreads through the use of infected cuttings. Sugarcane smut is a devastating disease in sugarcane growing areas globally.

== Hosts and symptoms ==
Sugarcane smut infects all sugarcane species unless the species is resistant. The damage caused depends on the susceptibility of the species. Sugarcane fields are planted using vegetative cuttings from mother plants so they have the same genetic make-up of the parent plant. Seeds are not used in propagation because sugarcane is a multi-species hybrid and therefore is difficult to breed. Sugarcane smuts can also infect some other grass species outside of sugarcane. However, mostly it remains on plants of the genus Saccharum.

Two to four months after the fungus has infected the plant, black whip-like structures, instead of a spindle leaf, emerge from the meristem, or growing point, of the plant. The developing whip is a mixture of plant tissue and fungal tissue. The whip reaches maturity between the sixth and the seventh month. When spores that are contained inside the whip are released, the core of the whip remains behind and is a straw-like color.

Plants infected with the fungus usually appear to have thin stalks and are often stunted. They end up tillering much more than normal and this results in leaves that are more slender and much weaker. They sometimes appear more grass-like than non-infected plants. Less common symptoms of the disease are stem or leaf galls and proliferating buds.

== Disease cycle ==
Sugarcane smut is disseminated via teliospores that are produced in the smut whip. These teliospores located either in the soil or on the plant, germinate in the presence of water. After germination they produce promycelium and undergo meiosis to create four haploid sporidia. Sugarcane smut is bipolar and therefore produces two different mating types of sporida. For infection to occur, two sporida from different mating types must come together and form a dikaryon. This dikaryon then produces hyphae that penetrate the bud scales of the sugarcane plant and infect the meristematic tissue. The fungus grows within the meristematic tissue and induces formation of flowering structures which it colonises to produce its teliopores. The flowering structures, usually typical grass arrows, are transformed into a whip like sorus that grows out between the leaf sheaths. At first it is covered by a thin silvery peridium (this is the host tissue) which easily peels back when desiccated to expose the sooty black-brown teliospores. These teliospores are then dispersed via wind and the cycle continues. The spores are reddish brown, round and subovoid and may be smooth to moderately echinulate. The size varies from 6.5 to 8 um. Sugarcane cultivars intended for distribution to other geographical areas should be tested for susceptibility to S. scitamineum populations in each area.

== Environment ==
Sugarcane smut is a very widespread disease and is prevalent in Central and South America, Africa, and South-Western Asia. Sugarcane smut has been reported in all countries that lie between 20 degrees north and south of the equator. The pathogen does well in hot dry weather for most of the disease cycle but requires wet conditions for teliospores to germinate.

== Gene expression ==
Plant disease resistance is the result of coevolution between the plant and pathogen. During Ustilago scitaminea infection, the fungus grows within the meristematic tissue and induces formation of flowering structures, which it colonises to produce its teliopores. The flowering structures, usually typical grass panicles, are transformed into a whip-like sorus that grows rapidly and protrudes out between the leaf sheaths. The development of sugarcane smut depends on the interaction among environment, the sugarcane variety and the pathogen itself. If the interaction between smut-resistant varieties and the pathogen is nonaffinity, disease resistance occurs; however, if the interaction between smut-susceptible varieties and the pathogen is affinity, disease susceptibility occurs. A series of physiological and biochemical changes, together with the molecular response, occur during the period between the appearance of the stress on plant from the invasion of the pathogen and the subsequent plant-pathogen interaction. Progress has been made in studies of the molecular basis of sugarcane smut resistance. According to one study, the type of resistance is a single gene resistance at the N52/219 gene site. Furthermore, this study talked about several different strains or races of Ustilago scitaminea. Despite what has been learned, more studies on the molecular interaction in this pathosystem are needed to discover the mechanisms of smut resistance.

== Protein expression ==
Despite what has been learned, little is known about the proteomic background of the interaction between pathogen and host in this pathosystem.

== Management ==
The management of sugarcane smut is done through the use of resistant cultivars, fungicide and using disease free planting stock. Control is mainly accomplished through the use of resistant cultivars in areas where the disease is present. Fungicides also are used in the control of this disease, but typically resistant cultivars are preferred due to the cost of fungicides. In areas where this disease is not yet found it is important to use disease-free planting stock so as not to introduce the pathogen. Important regulations are sometimes implemented by governments to help prevent the spread of the disease. Quarantines are also implemented in areas that are infected.

== Importance ==
Historically, sugarcane smut was first noted in 1877, in the Natal region of South Africa. The disease has been a problem in almost all countries where sugarcane is grown. Sugarcane smut did not make it to the western hemisphere until the 1940s when it reached Argentina. Australia was the last major producer of sugarcane to be infected. In 1998, the western coast was infected but the major production centers for Australia are on the country's east coast. Now infected plants have been found on both sides of the country, making sugarcane smut an issue in all production centers. At times the disease would go unnoticed or undetected until it would completely wipe out huge tracts of the crop.

Sugarcane smut can cause any amount of loss to susceptible varieties. Anywhere from 30% to total crop failure could be seen. The reduction in yield is mainly dependent on the races of the pathogen present, the variety of sugarcane, and the environmental conditions. Sugarcane plants are ratoon, meaning the plant resprouts after it is harvested providing the next crop. Because of this perennial nature, a total crop failure can lead to the need to replant a field. Now, it is typical to replace areas that have been infected with resistant varieties of sugarcane.

== See also ==
- Smut (fungus)
