= Landowner incentive program =

The Landowner Incentive Program is a United States Department of the Interior program that gives grants to state wildlife agencies for restoring rare wildlife habitat in cooperation with private landowners. The program received its first $40 million in appropriations from the U.S. Congress in 2002. Almost every state now has a funded program and $116 million has been appropriated since 2002. A subprogram has also been established for Native American tribes to restore wildlife habitat on tribal lands.

The program is part of the Bush Administration's "Cooperative Conservation" initiative, which focuses on voluntary partnerships between government and non-government parties like private landowners, cooperations, state government and others to achieve progress in conserving or restoring natural resources.

== Program mechanics ==
States compete for two sets of Landowner Incentive Program dollars. Tier I grants provide funding to states to staff and operate programs to work with landowners. Typically, these grants pay for a state program coordinator who works for the wildlife agency and field biologists who interact with landowners and help plan projects. Tier II grants provide funding to states which the state in turn awards to private landowners for the protection, restoration, or management of rare wildlife habitats. States are required to have an open, transparent process through which landowners can apply for funding and to establish an advisory panel that helps to oversee the program. Most states have advisory programs that include representation from government agencies, farmers and ranchers, environmentalists, and academia.

== History ==
The Landowner Incentive Program began as a Texas state program funded by the Administration of then-Governor George W. Bush and by the U.S. Fish and Wildlife Service. In 2002, the program received $40 million from the U.S. Congress, but the U.S. Fish and Wildlife Service was unable to set up and award funding before Congress rescinded the funding from 2002 and provided $40 million in 2003.

Since 2003, state wildlife agencies have steadily accumulated more and more successes in delivering results for rare wildlife with the conservation partnerships with private landowners. Oregon, Nebraska, Florida, Massachusetts, Hawaii, Kentucky and Minnesota have been particularly successful, winning more than $22 million in grants from the U.S. Fish and Wildlife Service and working with hundreds of landowners to restore wildlife.
