= Grasslands Reserve Program =

Defunct U.S. conservation program

The Grasslands Reserve Program (GRP) was a United States government program, administered by the Natural Resources Conservation Service, that provided financial assistance to farmers and landowners to restore grasslands. The 2002 farm bill authorized enrollment of 2 million acres (8,100 km^{2}) of restored or improved grassland, range land and pastureland under temporary and permanent easements, or contracts of at least 10 years. Under the GRP enrolled land must be in parcels that exceed 40 acres (160,000 m^{2}). Technical assistance was provided to restore grasslands. A total of $254 million in mandatory funding from the Commodity Credit Corporation (CCC) was provided between Fiscal Years 2003 and 2007. It also provided cost sharing payments at 75% to restore disturbed grasslands and 90% to protect virgin grasslands.

Congress, in the 2014 Farm Bill, consolidated the GRP into the Agricultural Conservation Easement Program.
