= Agricultural Management Assistance Program =

In United States federal agriculture legislation, the Agricultural Management Assistance Program was authorized in the Agricultural Risk Protection Act of 2000 (P.L. 106-224, Sec. 133) and permanently authorized and amended in the 2002 farm bill (P.L. 107-171, Sec. 2501) to provide mandatory funding of $20 million annually from FY2003 through FY 2007 and $10 million in all other years (but annual appropriations laws have reduced the funding). Participants in 15 designated states, primarily in the northeast, that had been under-served by crop insurance are to receive financial assistance, not to exceed $50,000 per year, to help pay to install conservation practices and take other specified actions that will reduce their financial risk.
