= Wildlife Habitat Incentives Program =

The Wildlife Habitat Incentives Program is a program established by the Federal Agriculture Improvement and Reform Act of 1996 (the Farm Bill) to promote voluntary implementation of on-farm management practices to develop habitat for wetland and upland wildlife, threatened and endangered species, fish, and other types of wildlife using cost-share payments and technical assistance. Between its inception and the start of the 2002 financial year, the program enrollment included 10,729 long-term agreements on over 1,600,000 acres (6,500 km^{2}). The Farm Security and Rural Investment Act of 2002 (P.L. 107–171, Sec. 1241) reauthorized the program through the 2007 financial year with mandatory annual funding from the Commodity Credit Corporation (CCC), growing from $15 million in 2002 to $85 million in 2005 through 2007. It also created a pilot program using up to 15% of the funding to provide additional payments to land owners who agree to enroll land for at least 15 years.

== See also ==
- Landowner incentive program
