= Usnea mayrhoferi =

Scientific classification
- Kingdom: Fungi
- Division: Ascomycota
- Class: Lecanoromycetes
- Order: Lecanorales
- Family: Parmeliaceae
- Genus: Usnea
- Species: U. mayrhoferi

Binomial name
- Usnea mayrhoferi Herrera-Camp., Bungartz, Truong & P.Clerc (2018)

Species of lichen

Usnea mayrhoferi is a species of fruticose lichen in the family Parmeliaceae. It is found in the Galápagos Islands.

== Taxonomy ==
Usnea mayrhoferi was first formally described by Maria de los Angeles Herrera-Campos, Frank Bungartz, Camille Truong, and Philippe Clerc in 2018. The species is named after Austrian lichenologist Helmut Mayrhofer, in honour of his 65th birthday. The type specimen of Usnea mayrhoferi was collected by Clerc on the Sierra Negra volcano (Isabela Island) at an altitude of 913 m (2,995 ft); there it was found growing on a living fencepost in a farming area.

== Description ==
Usnea mayrhoferi has a stiff, compact, and erect-shrubby appearance. Its branches are non-inflated and adorned with abundant tubercles, fibrils, and isidiofibrils. The base of the trunk is distinctly blackened, and annular (ring-like) cracks extend along the basal branches. Soralia (reproductive structures) are irregular and become large and excavate at the branch tips. The species has an opaque cortex, a very thin medulla, and a broad axis with an axis to medulla ratio greater than 4.5.

Usnea mayrhoferi is closely related to other species such as Usnea krogiana, U. brattiae, and U. cedrosiana. However, it can be distinguished by its unique combination of characteristics, including its blackened trunk, crowded soralia, and broad axis. While some of these species share similar chemistry, Usnea mayrhoferi has only been observed with a single chemotype containing norstictic acid.

== Habitat and distribution ==
This lichen bears resemblance to a group of similar and possibly closely related species, including Usnea brattiae, U. cedrosiana, U. krogiana, and U. patriciana. Each species has a different distribution, with Usnea mayrhoferi being known only from the Galápagos Islands. Compared to other Usnea species in the Galápagos, Usnea mayrhoferi is found in somewhat unusual habitats. It thrives in the humid zone, often growing close to the ground on small shrubs and ferns or even on plant debris.

== See also ==
- List of Usnea species
