= Usnea macaronesica =

Scientific classification
- Domain: Eukaryota
- Kingdom: Fungi
- Division: Ascomycota
- Class: Lecanoromycetes
- Order: Lecanorales
- Family: Parmeliaceae
- Genus: Usnea
- Species: U. macaronesica

Binomial name
- Usnea macaronesica P.Clerc (2006)

Species of lichen

Usnea macaronesica is a species of beard lichen in the family Parmeliaceae. Characterized by its shrubby greenish-yellow appearance growing 2–5 cm in length, it features distinctive large, excavated reproductive structures and a unique chemical composition. Originally discovered in Macaronesia (the Azores and Canary Islands) where it grows in forest ecosystems, it was later found in coastal areas of North America, specifically Maine and Nova Scotia, where it typically grows on conifers near shorelines. This lichen is related to several other Usnea species but can be distinguished by its specific branch structure, thin central axis, and broad inner layer, as well as the presence of certain lichen products in its composition that vary between populations.

== Taxonomy ==
Usnea macaronesica was described by the Swiss lichenologist Philippe Clerc in 2006. The species name macaronesica refers to Macaronesia, the collective name for several groups of islands in the North Atlantic Ocean, including the Azores and Canary Islands where this lichen was first discovered and characterized.

The species belongs to the Usnea fragilescens group and is related to several other Usnea species including U. cornuta, U. fragilescens, and U. esperantiana, but has distinctive characteristics that separate it from these relatives.

== Description ==
Usnea macaronesica has a shrubby, somewhat rigid growth form typically reaching 2–5 cm in length. Its overall colour is greenish-yellow. The branching pattern is anisotomic-dichotomous, meaning the branches divide unevenly into two parts. The base (trunk) of the lichen is often indistinct and short, rapidly dividing into main branches. In some specimens, the base can be longer and distinctly jet black for the first 1–2 mm. The main branches measure 0.9–1.4 mm in diameter and are irregular in shape. The lateral branches may be slightly to distinctly narrowed at their attachment points, and branch segments can be cylindrical or slightly to distinctly sausage-like in appearance.

One of the most distinctive features of U. macaronesica is its soralia – structures for asexual reproduction that produce powdery propagules. These soralia are large (more than half the branch diameter), typically concave to fully excavated when mature, and often extend to the central axis. The soralia usually have small finger-like projections called isidiomorphs on their surface, especially when young.

The outer layer (cortex) of the lichen is glossy and relatively thin (5.5–7.5% of branch diameter). The inner layer (medulla) is distinctively large (28–36% of branch diameter) and has a two-layered structure: a thin, dense layer near the cortex and a loose layer around the central axis. The central axis is thin, comprising only about 9.5–14.5% of the branch diameter.

The species shows some chemical variation, with four known chemical variants (chemotypes):

- usnic and barbatic acids
- usnic, stictic, constictic, cryptostictic, menegazziaic, norstictic and barbatic acids
- usnic, stictic, constictic, cryptostictic, menegazziaic, and norstictic acids
- usnic acid only

One of the most reliable diagnostic features of U. macaronesica is its distinctive combination of a short fruticose growth habit, branches that are clearly constricted at ramification points, large and excavated soralia (similar to those found in Usnea lapponica), a thin central axis, and an exceptionally lax and broad medulla. The presence of barbatic acid in the medulla is also considered a characteristic chemical feature that helps distinguish it from similar species.

== Habitat and distribution ==
Usnea macaronesica was initially known only from the Azores and the western Canary Islands, and previously considered a rare species compared to some other Usnea species in the region. In the Azores, it has been collected at elevations between 500 and 1,100 m (1,600 and 3,600 ft), primarily in forest ecosystems. It often grows alongside Usnea krogiana, though it appears to be less common and more restricted to forest habitats. Similarly, in the Canary Islands, U. macaronesica occurs between 800 and 1,500 m (2,600 and 4,900 ft) elevation.

While initially considered endemic to Macaronesia, U. macaronesica was later discovered in North America. In 2006, specimens were collected during a research excursion to Great Wass Island Preserve in Maine (USA). Further examination revealed populations in both Maine and Nova Scotia (Canada). The North American specimens match the morphological and anatomical characteristics of those from Macaronesia, though they predominantly display the chemistry of chemotype 2 (containing stictic and barbatic acids). Unlike their Macaronesian counterparts, the North American populations are typically found on trees, primarily conifers growing near the shoreline, suggesting a potential adaptation to coastal environments.

The lichen is frequently found parasitized by lichen-dwelling fungi, which may contribute to some of the variation seen in its morphology, particularly in the appearance of its soralia and the frequency of isidiomorphs.

== See also ==
- List of Usnea species
