= Usnea subflammea =

Scientific classification
- Domain: Eukaryota
- Kingdom: Fungi
- Division: Ascomycota
- Class: Lecanoromycetes
- Order: Lecanorales
- Family: Parmeliaceae
- Genus: Usnea
- Species: U. subflammea

Binomial name
- Usnea subflammea P.Clerc (2006)

Species of lichen

Usnea subflammea is a species of beard lichen in the family Parmeliaceae. It is characterized by its typically pendulous (hanging) growth form, thick cortex, and distinctive stipitate (stalked) soralia that develop at the tips of eroded tubercles (small bumps). This species occurs in the Azores and Canary Islands, and various countries in Central and South America.

== Taxonomy ==
Usnea subflammea was formally described by the Swiss lichenologist Philippe Clerc in 2006. The holotype specimen was collected at Cabeço do Redondo on Pico Island in the Azores, at an elevation of 700 m (2,300 ft).

The species name subflammea suggests its relationship to Usnea flammea, which it closely resembles in several features. Clerc initially considered it might be a pendulous, optimally developed form of U. flammea, but various morphological differences led him to describe it as a distinct species. It is also related to U. schadenbergiana and U. geissleriana.

== Description ==
Usnea subflammea varies in growth form from pendulous to subpendulous, or rarely shrubby. Typically, mature specimens are pendulous, ranging from 4 to 20 cm in length, with a yellowish-green colour. The branching pattern is primarily anisotomic-dichotomous (unevenly forking into two), especially near the tips, but shows some tendency toward isotomy (equal branching). The base (trunk) of the lichen is short and either the same colour as the main branches or has a light brownish pigmentation. It features numerous and distinct ring-like cracks (5–9 cracks per 0.5 cm). The branches taper gradually and are cylindrical, with distinct segments. Lateral branches are not narrowed at their attachment points.

One of the most distinctive features of U. subflammea is the presence of large, conspicuous tubercles (small protuberances) that are distinctly eroded and develop soredia (powdery reproductive structures) at their tips. These soralia (groups of soredia) are distinctly stalked and convex, not expanding as they mature, and arise from the tubercles. Young soralia may have short isidiomorphs (small, finger-like projections), though these are rare on mature soralia.

The lichen often has long (3–15 mm), slender fibrils (small branches) that can be very densely arranged, especially near the base, giving a fishbone-like appearance. Fibercles (small, fibre-like projections) are also frequently present.

The cortex (outer layer) is thick, making up about 12–16% of the branch diameter, with a matt appearance and noticeable transverse cracks, especially near the trunk. The medulla (inner layer) is thin (13–19%) and compact, while the central axis is thick (33–47%).

Chemically, U. subflammea produces usnic acid in the cortex and the stictic acid group (including stictic, constictic, cryptostictic, menegazziaic, and norstictic acids) in the medulla. Unlike U. flammea, it never produces lobaric acid.

== Habitat and distribution ==
Usnea subflammea occurs in the Azores archipelago and Tenerife in the Canary Islands, where it appears to be rare. In these locations, it is a species of relatively low elevation, found between 660 and 850 m (2,170 and 2,790 ft). In the Azores, it has been collected from mixed cloud forests, isolated shrubs or trees in pastures, and along roadsides. It grows frequently on Juniperus brevifolia (Azores juniper) and Erica species. On Tenerife in the Canary Islands, where it seems to be very rare, it has been found in similar habitats. In Central and South America, it has been recorded from Bolivia, Brazil, Colombia, Costa Rica, Ecuador, Peru, and Venezuela, typically at altitudinal ranges between 1,600 and 3,200 m (5,200 and 10,500 ft).

== See also ==
- List of Usnea species
