= Usnea subdasaea =

Scientific classification
- Kingdom: Fungi
- Division: Ascomycota
- Class: Lecanoromycetes
- Order: Lecanorales
- Family: Parmeliaceae
- Genus: Usnea
- Species: U. subdasaea

Binomial name
- Usnea subdasaea Truong & P.Clerc (2011)

Species of lichen-forming fungus

Usnea subdasaea is a species of beard lichen in the family Parmeliaceae. It has an erect, shrubby growth form, typically reaching about 7 cm (2.8 in) long, and often has a faint reddish tinge due to an orange pigment layer beneath the surface. The species bears minute powdery patches and abundant fine outgrowths on its branches. It occurs in the Galápagos Islands and in the tropical Andes from Bolivia to Venezuela, with an outlying record from Florida.

== Taxonomy ==
Usnea subdasaea is a fruticose lichen in the family Parmeliaceae. It was described as a new species in 2011 by Camille Truong and Philippe Clerc in a study of Usnea species from the tropical Andes and the Galápagos Islands that have red to orange pigmentation in the cortex or just beneath it. The type specimen was collected in the Galápagos (Isabela Island, near the road to Sierra Negra crater, close to La Esperanza) at about 306 m elevation, where it was growing on a living fencepost with bark in farming areas of the humid zone.

In the original treatment, the species was defined by a combination of irregular, often slightly inflated branches that narrow where side branches attach, abundant fibrils and isidiofibrils on parts of the branches, and an orange subcortical pigment layer in the medulla. The authors reported it from both the Andes and the Galápagos; on the South American mainland it was treated as rare, while in the Galápagos it was recorded more frequently. Frank Bungartz and coauthors treated U. subdasaea as one of the Galápagos Usnea species with an orange, subcortical pigment in the medulla, and they emphasized that it can be confused with several close lookalikes. In particular, U. dasaea is similar in overall form and chemistry but lacks the pigmented medulla and does not form isidiofibrils; U. grandisora differs in having much larger soralia that may encircle branches and become deeply excavate, as well as a thicker cortex. Clerc later noted that the presence of a subcortical red pigment is a useful diagnostic character, because U. subdasaea and the similar-looking U. dasaea are not closely related.

== Description ==
The thallus is erect-shrubby and only rarely somewhat hanging, usually about 7 cm long (occasionally to 12 cm). It may show a reddish tint, especially near the base. Although U. subdasaea lacks red pigmentation in the cortex itself, it can still look faintly reddish in the field because the orange subcortical pigment in the medulla can "shine through" to the surface; this can make it easy to confuse at first glance with truly cortically pigmented species such as U. rubicunda. Branching is unevenly forked; the trunk is the same color as the branches, and the branches taper but are often distinctly irregular in thickness. Branch segments are round in cross-section and can be slightly to distinctly inflated, with side branches usually slightly to distinctly narrowed at their attachment points.

The surface of the main branches bears few to many papillae (tiny surface protusions), and some papillae may erode at the top. Short, thin fibrils (to about 2 mm) are often numerous and can densely cover parts of the branches. Soralia are minute and irregular in outline, developing mainly on terminal branches. They usually remain small but can rarely enlarge or merge into irregular patches, and may become slightly stalked. Isidiomorphs are typically abundant (to about 1 mm long) and often develop into isidiofibrils that mix with the fibrils on the branch surface.

In cross-section, the cortex is thin (about 5–7.5% of branch width), fragile, and shiny. The medulla is loose to dense and usually shows an orange pigmented layer just beneath the cortex, though the pigmentation can be faint and discontinuous. Apothecia (fruiting bodies) were reported as very rare (to about 4 mm across) with many cilia. Ascospores are hyaline and obovoid, and pycnidia were not observed. The medulla may react K+ (yellow turning red) and P+ (yellow to orange), consistent with salazinic, galbinic, and norstictic acids. A second chemotype lacking K and P reactions was also reported, with unidentified triterpenoids detected by thin-layer chromatography.

== Habitat and distribution ==
Usnea subdasaea is known from the Neotropics and has been reported from Bolivia, Brazil, Colombia, Ecuador, Peru, and Venezuela. Clerc also reported U. subdasaea as new to North America based on a specimen collected in Florida (on twigs of Magnolia virginiana), which had originally been set aside as an unusual, pigmented form of U. dasaea. It is not treated as endemic to the Galápagos. In the archipelago it is more common than the similar U. dasaea and is most often found in open habitats of the transition and humid zones (only rarely in the dry zone); it also reaches the high-altitude dry zone. It grows mainly on bark (including cacti) and on wood such as fenceposts, and it has been recorded on both native and introduced trees.

In continental South America, it has been collected from about 1,275 to 2,700 m (4,183 to 8,858 ft) elevation, while in the Galápagos it is known from about 200 to 1,300 m (660 to 4,270 ft). In the tropical Andes it was characterised as rare, and in the Galápagos it was described as frequent in humid-zone farming areas. Although it was included in a checklist of Philippine lichens in 2018, Gerlach and colleagues consider this record dubious.

== See also ==
- List of Usnea species
