= Usnea crocata =

Scientific classification
- Kingdom: Fungi
- Division: Ascomycota
- Class: Lecanoromycetes
- Order: Lecanorales
- Family: Parmeliaceae
- Genus: Usnea
- Species: U. crocata

Binomial name
- Usnea crocata Truong & P.Clerc (2011)

Species of lichen-forming fungus

Usnea crocata is a species of beard lichen in the family Parmeliaceae. It has an erect to somewhat hanging, shrubby growth form, reaching up to 20 cm (8 in) long, and bears minute powdery patches used for reproduction. The species is distinguished by an orange pigment layer beneath the outer surface that can give the whole thallus an orange tinge. It is endemic to the tropical Andes, where it grows on trees and shrubs in mountainous cloud forests and open pastures.

== Taxonomy ==
Usnea crocata was formally described as a new species in 2011 by Camille Truong and Philippe Clerc as part of a taxonomic treatment of red-orange pigmented Usnea species from the tropical Andes and the Galápagos Islands. The type specimen was collected in Venezuela (Táchira, in the Páramo de Tama area) at about 2,000–2,300 m (6,600–7,500 ft), from open, rocky pasture habitat.

In that treatment, U. crocata was defined by a combination of features: terete (round) branches with minute soralia (powdery reproductive patches), a relatively thick and glossy outer layer (cortex), and an orange pigment layer in the medulla just beneath the cortex (subcortical pigmentation) that can give the thallus an overall orange cast. It was separated from similar red-pigmented species such as U. subdasaea by differences in cortex thickness, chemistry, and typical growth form, and it was reported only from the Neotropical Andes in the material examined.

== Description ==
The thallus is erect-shrubby to somewhat hanging, reaching about 20 cm (8 in) long, with unevenly forked branching. The trunk is usually the same color as the branches, sometimes with a faint pinkish to orange tinge. Branches generally taper, the segments are terete and not inflated, and side branches are usually not narrowed where they attach; shallow pits (foveoles) and pale spots (maculae) were not observed.

The surface of the main branches is typically roughened by low, often indistinct papillae, and long, slender fibrils (up to about 5 mm) may be scattered to fairly numerous. Soralia are minute and irregular in outline, developing mainly on the terminal branches. They usually remain small (only rarely enlarging a little or clustering), and may be flat to slightly stalked. Isidiomorphs (small, outgrowth-like propagules) range from few to abundant and are usually short; development into longer isidiofibrils was reported only rarely. No apothecia or pycnidia were observed in the studied material.

In cross section, the cortex is relatively thick and shiny, and the medulla is dense to compact. An orange pigmented layer is often present just below the cortex, sometimes strong enough to tint the whole thallus. Chemical spot tests of the medulla were K− and P+ (orange-yellow), consistent with protocetraric acid (with usnic acid in the cortex), and thin-layer chromatography sometimes detected trace amounts of an unidentified triterpenoid.

== Habitat and distribution ==
Usnea crocata grows mainly on bark (on trees and shrubs), and more rarely on dead wood. In the tropical Andes it was associated with open habitats such as pastures with remnant trees, secondary montane cloud forests along roads, and shrubby vegetation (matorral), occurring from mid- to high-elevation sites up to the upper tree line, which was about 2,200–3,000 m (7,200–9,800 ft) in the material examined).

Based on the specimens studied, the species was reported from the Neotropical Andes (with examined material from multiple Andean countries) and was treated as endemic to that region at the time of publication. A survey of large lichens in the Venezuelan Andes recorded Usnea crocata in montane forest in Sierra Nevada de Mérida National Park, where it was found only within an extremely narrow elevational band of about 5 metres (around 2,230–2,235 m). Because the species occupies such a restricted range, the authors concluded that even very slight warming could eliminate its habitat locally.

== See also ==
- List of Usnea species
