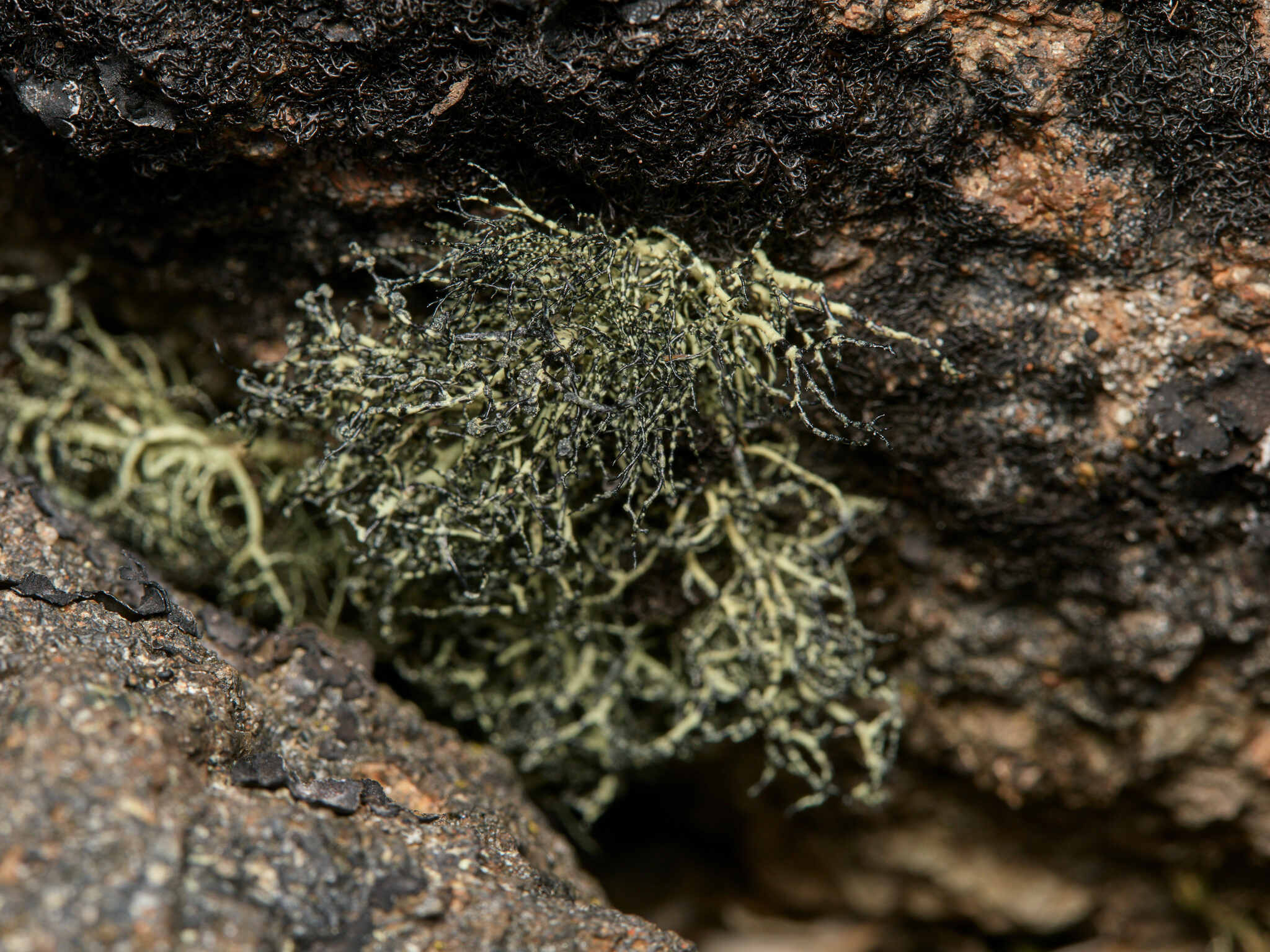
- At Mount Adams, Washington

Conservation status
- Apparently Secure (NatureServe)

Scientific classification
- Kingdom: Fungi
- Division: Ascomycota
- Class: Lecanoromycetes
- Order: Lecanorales
- Family: Parmeliaceae
- Genus: Usnea
- Species: U. lambii

Binomial name
- Usnea lambii (Imshaug) Wirtz & Lumbsch (2011)

Synonyms
- Neuropogon lambii Imshaug (1954)

= Usnea lambii =

Species of lichen

Usnea lambii or "witch's hair" is a small species of fruticose lichen in the family Parmeliaceae. It was first formally described as a new species in 1954 by Henry Imshaug. It has a bipolar distribution, that is, it occurs at both of Earth's polar regions. It is also found at high elevations in Mount Rainier National Park in Washington state, where it was first discovered.

== Taxonomy ==
Usnea lambii was formally described by American lichenologist Henry Imshaug as a member of genus Neuropogon. The species epithet honours Elke Mackenzie (formerly Lamb), "one of lichenology's most devoted students and an outstanding monographer". The type specimen was collected near Yakima Park, Mount Rainier National Park, Washington, U.S.A. by Per Fredrik Scholander on 19 August 1942; the elevation was 6,000 ft (1,800 m). The type specimen is housed in the Farlow Herbarium of Cryptogamic Botany at Harvard University. Neuropogon was later subsumed into Usnea when molecular phylogenetic analysis showed that the genus was polyphyletic, with a core group of species nested in genus Usnea. Subsequently, the taxon was transferred to Usnea in 2011 by H. Thorsten Lumbsch and Volkmar Wirth.

In 1985, F. Joy Walker proposed relegating Usnea lambii to synonymy with Usnea sphacelata, but subsequent molecular data shows that the species are distinct.

== Description ==
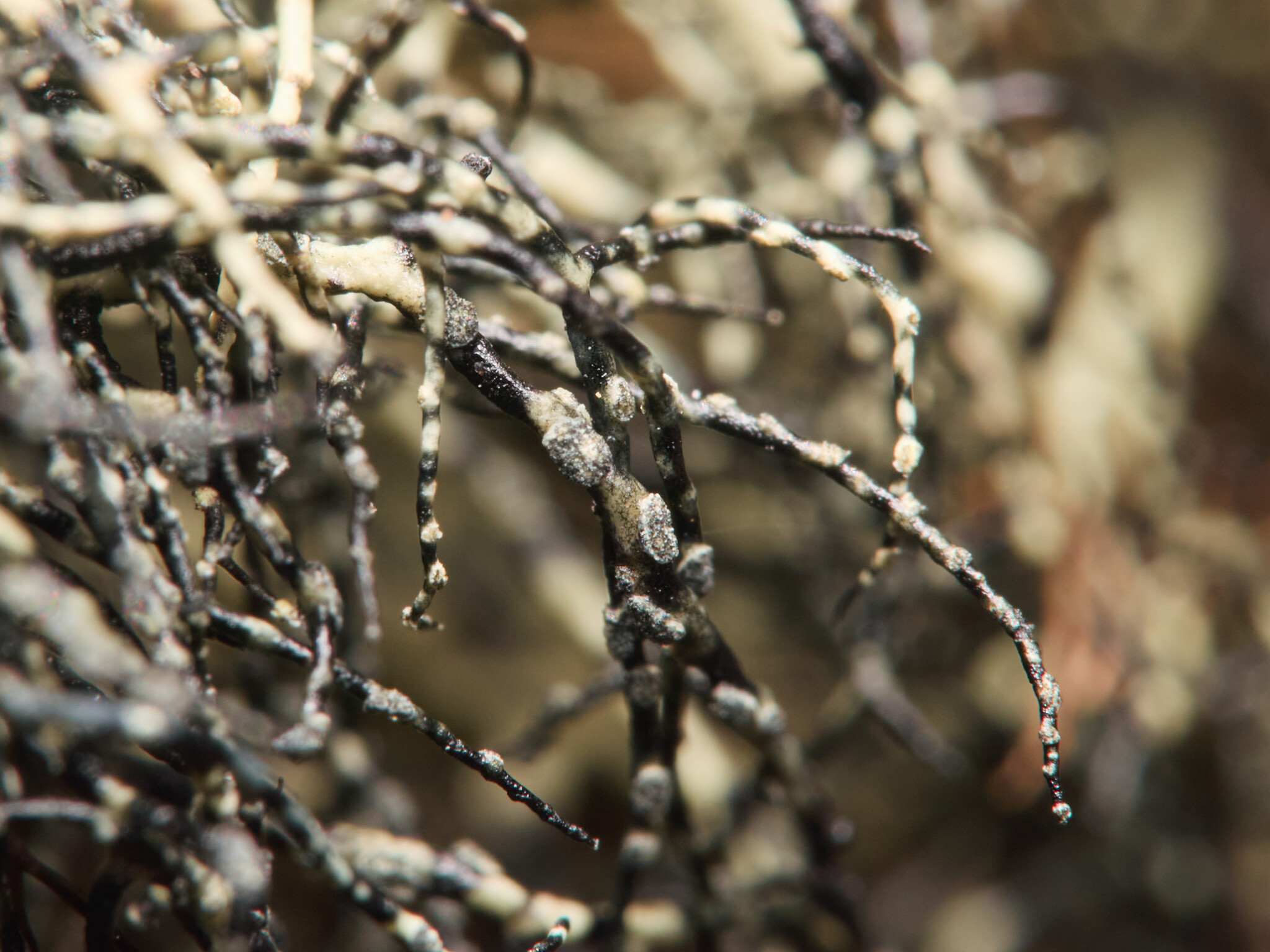
Closeup of soralia and branches

Usnea lambii grows erect and fruticulose (i.e. small and bushy), reaching up to about 2 cm (3/4 in) in height. The thallus is narrowly anchored at the base, branching sparsely. The basal branches are mostly sulphurous-yellow in color but can darken above, with a smooth and somewhat polished texture. They do not have any significant verrucose or annular (ring-like) rimose features. The thinner, ultimate branches may develop a banded appearance due to blackening. These branches have abundant soredia which are yellowish, possibly turning black, with a grainy texture. Neither apothecia (sexual reproductive structures) nor pycnidia (asexual reproductive structures) have been observed in the species.

There are two chemotypes of U. lambii: chemotype 1 contains usnic acid, while chemotype 2 contains usnic acid and psoromic acid as major substances, hypostrepsilic acid as a minor component, and trace amounts of isostrepsilic acid.

It has similarities with Usnea sulphurea due to the loose nature of the medulla but can be distinguished by its branches which are not scabrid-verruculose. It is also noted to closely resemble Usnea acromelana but has distinct differences in medulla and central strand structure.

== Habitat and distribution ==
The discovery of Usnea lambii in the Northern Hemisphere, specifically on Mount Rainier, was significant at the time, as traditionally, Neuropogon species had mostly found in the Southern Hemisphere. This particular species, having affinities with arctic species but being found in Mount Rainier rather than high elevations in the Rocky Mountains (similar to some other bipolar lichens), has a unique distribution pattern.

== See also ==
- List of Usnea species
