= Usnea oreophila =

Scientific classification
- Domain: Eukaryota
- Kingdom: Fungi
- Division: Ascomycota
- Class: Lecanoromycetes
- Order: Lecanorales
- Family: Parmeliaceae
- Genus: Usnea
- Species: U. oreophila

Binomial name
- Usnea oreophila A.Gerlach & P.Clerc (2019)

Species of lichen

Usnea oreophila is a little-known species of saxicolous (rock-dwelling) beard lichen in the family Parmeliaceae. Found in high-altitude regions of Brazil, it was formally described as a new species in 2019 by Alice Gerlach and Philippe Clerc.

== Description ==
Usnea oreophila is distinguished by its patchy reddish pigmentation overlaying a jet-black basal layer. The branches feature numerous cracks with characteristic downturned edges. The thallus contains abundant sorediate fibercles and possesses a thick, hollow (fistulose) central axis. Chemical analysis reveals a complex secondary metabolite composition with squamatic acid as the primary compound in the medulla.

== Distribution ==
At the time of its original publication, Usnea oreophila had been documented exclusively from high-altitude grasslands exceeding 1,200 m (3,900 ft) above sea level in the Brazilian states of Minas Gerais, Paraná, and Santa Catarina.

== See also ==
- List of Usnea species
