= Usnea galapagona =

Scientific classification
- Kingdom: Fungi
- Division: Ascomycota
- Class: Lecanoromycetes
- Order: Lecanorales
- Family: Parmeliaceae
- Genus: Usnea
- Species: U. galapagona

Binomial name
- Usnea galapagona Truong & P.Clerc (2011)
- Holotype site: Cerro Mundo, San Cristóbal Island

Species of lichen

Usnea galapagona is a species of beard lichen in the family Parmeliaceae. It is endemic to the Galápagos Islands. The lichen is easily recognized by its special structure. It has a tough, glass-like outer layer, a thick central core, and a very faint, almost invisible inner layer. This lichen stands upright and has a reddish colour near its base. Its branches split unevenly and are generally few in number, without any small, hair-like structures.

== Taxonomy ==
The lichen was described as new to science in 2011 by the lichenologists Camille Truong and Philippe Clerc. The type specimen was collected by the authors from San Cristóbal Island. The lichen was found in the transition zone at Cerro Mundo, near the summit at an elevation of 282 m (925 ft). This area is characterised by the presence of Bursera graveolens, Croton scouleri, and Jasminocereus thouarsii. The lichen was discovered on a Jasminocereus thouarsii plant located on the ridge.

== Description ==
Usnea galapagona is a fruticose species, reaching lengths of up to 8 cm (3.1 in). It grows erect and is shrubby, often anchoring itself at multiple points on its substrate. The base of the thallus typically matches the colour of the lichen, with a possible reddish hue. The branches have an anisotomic to dichotomous pattern of branching and range from irregular to tapering shapes without constriction at their points of attachment. These branches are either round or slightly flat and ridged in cross-section. Terminal branches are less divided and thicken towards their ends.

Fibrils (short branches that are perpendicular to the main branches) are rare or entirely absent in this species. Hemispherical papillae are common. Soralia are tiny and often cluster together or merge, appearing as a larger soralium, and are found either atop papillae or directly on the cortex. These soralia maintain a flat profile with a distinct cortical margin and rarely become slightly raised. Isidiomorphs, which are very small, are also present in this species.

Apothecia, the reproductive structures of lichens, have not been observed in this species. The cortex is thick and vitreous, accounting for 15.5–19.5% of the branch width. The medulla is compact, typically thin, and almost indistinct, but it can thicken near the base. The central axis of the branches is particularly thick, ranging from 54.5 to 62% of the branch width. Chemical spot tests reveal no reaction in the medulla to a solution of potassium hydroxide (K−), calcium hypochlorite (C−), or paraphenylenediamine (P−). The secondary metabolites (lichen products) detected through thin-layer chromatography include usnic acid and an unidentified compound that shows a green fluorescence after charring under ultraviolet light.

== Habitat and distribution ==
Usnea galapagona is endemic to the Galápagos Islands, specifically identified on Isabela, San Cristóbal, Santa Cruz, Pinta, and Floreana Island. In terms of frequency, it has been described as "moderately common". Typically, it thrives in exposed environments such as ridge lines or volcanic crater slopes. Most commonly, it inhabits the transitional vegetation zones of these islands, although it is occasionally found in both arid and humid zones. This lichen predominantly grows on rocky surfaces and cacti, and less frequently on bark, such as on the trunks of Bursera graveolens trees.

== See also ==
- List of Usnea species
