= Usnea subcomplecta =

Scientific classification
- Domain: Eukaryota
- Kingdom: Fungi
- Division: Ascomycota
- Class: Lecanoromycetes
- Order: Lecanorales
- Family: Parmeliaceae
- Genus: Usnea
- Species: U. subcomplecta

Binomial name
- Usnea subcomplecta Truong, P.Clerc & Herrera-Camp. (2018)

Species of lichen

Usnea subcomplecta is a species of fruticose lichen in the family Parmeliaceae. It is found in the Galápagos Islands. It is characterized by its flaccid branches, blackened trunk, and pruinose cortex surface.

== Taxonomy ==
Usnea subcomplecta was first described by Camille Truong, Philippe Clerc, and Maria de los Angeles Herrera-Campos in 2018. The species epithet was inspired by its superficial resemblance to U. complecta. The type specimen was collected on Santa Cruz Island in the Galápagos Islands, at an altitude of 594 m (1,949 ft), where it was found growing on twigs of Bursera graveolens.

== Description ==
The thallus of Usnea subcomplecta is erect-shrubby to sub-pendulous, flaccid, and soft to the touch. The branches are slightly inflated and covered in low tubercles. The trunk is usually blackened below the first ramification, and the cortex surface is pruinose. The lichen has plane, circular soralia with a thin cortical rim at maturity. The medulla is dense, and the species contains salazinic acid. Apothecia and pycnidia have not been observed in this species.

The distinguishing features of Usnea subcomplecta include its flaccid thallus with slightly inflated branches, blackish base below the first ramification, and plane, circular soralia. The pruinose cortex, opaque cortex, and dense medulla also help to differentiate this species from others in the genus. The soralia of U. subcomplecta remain plane and never become capitate or stipitate, which further sets it apart from U. complecta.

== Habitat and distribution ==
Usnea subcomplecta is believed to be endemic to the Galápagos Islands, where it is a common species. It thrives in the humid and upper transition zones, as well as in some high-altitude dry zones. The lichen is usually found in open, often disturbed habitats such as farmland areas, fence posts, and trees along pastures. However, it can also be found within the Galápagos National Park among native vegetation such as Zanthoxylum woodland, Psidium galapageium woodland, Scalesia forests, and Miconia shrubland.

== See also ==
- List of Usnea species
