= Patricia Geissler =

Swiss botanist and bryologist (1947–2000)

Patricia E. Geissler
- Born: July 25, 1947; Basel, Switzerland
- Died: March 28, 2000 (aged 52); Geneva, Switzerland
- Education: University of Basel
- Known for: Research on liverworts Index Hepaticarum
- Scientific career
- Fields: Botany; Bryology
- Workplaces: University of Basel (1971–1977); Geneva Botanical Garden (1977–2000); University of Geneva (1986–2000)
- Thesis: Zur Vegetation alpiner Fliessgewässer (On the Vegetation of Alpine Running Waters) (1974)
- Doctoral advisor: Heinrich Zoller
- Author abbrev. (botany): P.Geissler

Patricia E. Geissler (25 July 1947 – 28 March 2000) was a Swiss botanist and bryologist who made significant contributions to the study of liverworts and alpine plants. She served as curator of cryptogams at the Geneva Botanical Garden for over two decades and was known for her work on the Index Hepaticarum.

== Early life and education ==
Patricia Geissler was born in Basel, Switzerland. She completed her primary and secondary education in St. Gallen, where her parents operated a medical practice. Her classical education included Latin and Greek.

After completing her Matura (Swiss secondary school leaving certificate) with a focus on classical languages in 1966, Geissler returned to Basel to study natural sciences at the University of Basel. She developed an early interest in botany during her undergraduate studies, influenced by the lectures and field excursions of Professor Heinrich Zoller. In 1974, she completed her PhD with a dissertation on the vegetation of alpine running waters (Zur Vegetation alpiner Fliessgewässer).

== Career ==
=== Academic positions ===
Geissler began her academic career at the Botanical Institute of the University of Basel, where she worked as an assistant from 1971 to 1977. In 1977, she accepted a position as curator of cryptogams and gymnosperms at the Conservatoire et Jardin botaniques in Geneva. Following the death of her predecessor Charles Edmond Bradlaugh Bonner, she became responsible for managing the collections of algae, bryophytes, lichens, pteridophytes, and gymnosperms. She managed these collections with expertise and foresight for 23 years, becoming known for her prompt assistance to colleagues requesting specimen loans.

From 1986, Geissler held a teaching position at the University of Geneva, where she conducted lectures and courses in systematic botany and cryptogam flora. She supervised doctoral research and occasionally taught as a guest lecturer at the University of Basel.

=== Research ===
Geissler's research focused primarily on bryophytes, with a particular interest in the family Lejeuneaceae and specifically the genus Marchesinia. She conducted numerous research expeditions, including trips to New Guinea, Paraguay, and Madagascar. A significant achievement in her career was her work on volumes 10–12 and the second edition of volume 8/9 of the Index Hepaticarum, a comprehensive reference work cataloguing liverwort species, which she completed in collaboration with Hélène Bischler.

Throughout her career, Geissler published over one hundred scientific papers. She was particularly concerned with environmental conservation, especially regarding the impact of ski slope development on mountain forests, hillside moors, and snow-bed vegetation.

=== Professional activities ===
In 1979, Geissler organised the third international congress of the International Association of Bryologists in Geneva. She served on various scientific committees and was active in both national and international scientific societies. Her involvement included work with the Swiss National Park Commission and presidency of the Swiss Botanical Society.

== Personal life ==
Geissler was multilingual, giving lectures in English, German, French, Italian, and Spanish. She maintained strong connections to eastern Switzerland throughout her life. As a German speaker from eastern Switzerland, she integrated successfully into French-speaking Geneva, quickly becoming fluent in French. She maintained pride in her St. Gallen dialect, which she continued to use when speaking with colleagues from eastern Switzerland. Beyond her scientific work, she was an accomplished musician who played both violin and piano, often performing chamber music with friends.

Known for her environmental consciousness, Geissler primarily used a bicycle for transportation. She died on 28 March 2000 in Geneva following injuries sustained in a cycling accident. The beard lichen species Usnea geissleriana was named in her honour in 2006 by her colleague Philippe Clerc.
