= Usnea patriciana =

Scientific classification
- Domain: Eukaryota
- Kingdom: Fungi
- Division: Ascomycota
- Class: Lecanoromycetes
- Order: Lecanorales
- Family: Parmeliaceae
- Genus: Usnea
- Species: U. patriciana

Binomial name
- Usnea patriciana Bungartz, Herrera-Camp. & P.Clerc (2018)

Species of lichen

Usnea patriciana is a rare species of fruticose lichen in the family Parmeliaceae. It is endemic to the Galápagos Islands. This beard lichen has a shrubby appearance with cylindrical branches and distinct black pigmentation at its base.

== Taxonomy ==
Usnea patriciana was formally described as a new species by Frank Bungartz, Maria de los Angeles Herrera-Campos, and Philippe Clerc in 2018. The type specimen was discovered on San Cristóbal Island, along the northern border of Galápagos National Park; there, at an altitude of 315 m (1,033 ft), it was found growing on fallen tree branches. The species was named in appreciation of herbarium curator Patricia Jaramillo, of the Charles Darwin Research Station, "for her friendship and continued support of the Galapagos Lichen Inventory".

== Description ==
This lichen species has a shrubby or somewhat pendulous growth form with branches that are cylindrical and non-inflated. The base is distinctly blackish for the first few millimeters. The branches bear abundant tubercles, which are hemispherical and eroded at the tip. The soralia, reproductive structures on the lichen's surface, are plane, circular to elongated, and remain well-delimited by a thin cortical rim that persists even when crowded. The species can be distinguished from similar species by its non-inflated branches with abundant tubercles, black pigmentation at its base, and plane soralia that remain well-delimited by a cortical rim. The chemistry of Usnea patriciana includes salazinic acid, which can be detected in the medulla.

=== Similar species ===
Usnea patriciana is most similar to another lichen species, Usnea brattiae. However, the trunk of U. patriciana is typically dark brown to blackish, while the trunk of U. brattiae is mostly the same colour as the basal branches, and rarely reddish-brown. U. patriciana has cylindrical and irregular branches with abundant tubercles, while U. brattiae has regularly terete (round, cylindrical, or slightly tapering shape in cross-section) branches lacking tubercles. The cortex of U. patriciana is matte, thicker than the cortex of U. brattiae, which appears shiny in section. The medulla of both species is similar, but U. patriciana has a distinctly thicker axis than U. brattiae. The chemistry of U. brattiae is more variable, while only one chemotype is known for U. patriciana (salazinic acid).

== Habitat and distribution ==
Usnea patriciana is endemic to the Galápagos Islands. It is a little-known species found mainly in the humid and upper transition zones of the islands. The lichen typically grows in exposed habitats, including small branches and twigs, shrubs, small trees, and fenceposts.

== See also ==
- List of Usnea species
