= Usnea grandisora =

Scientific classification
- Kingdom: Fungi
- Division: Ascomycota
- Class: Lecanoromycetes
- Order: Lecanorales
- Family: Parmeliaceae
- Genus: Usnea
- Species: U. grandisora

Binomial name
- Usnea grandisora Truong & P.Clerc (2011)

Species of lichen-forming fungus

Usnea grandisora is a species of beard lichen in the family Parmeliaceae. It is known from the Galápagos Islands and has also been reported from Venezuela. It has an erect, shrubby growth form reaching about 8 cm (3 in) long, with an orange pigment layer beneath the surface and large powdery patches used for reproduction. The species grows on bark and wood in open habitats, from farmland edges to humid-zone woodlands.

== Taxonomy ==
Usnea grandisora was described as a new species in 2011 by Camille Truong and Philippe Clerc from material collected in the Galápagos Islands (type from Santa Cruz Island, above Mina Granillo, about 607 m (1,991 ft) elevation, growing on branches of Scalesia).

The species was defined by its orange pigmentation in the medulla just beneath the cortex (a subcortical pigment layer), together with soralia that quickly enlarge and become deeply hollowed out. In the Galápagos it was distinguished from similar orange-pigmented species such as U. subdasaea and U. poliotrix by its thicker, glossy cortex and its usually large, branch-wide soralia. It was also compared with the African U. bicolorata complex, which differs in overall form, base coloration, and chemistry.

== Description ==
The thallus is erect-shrubby, reaching about 8 cm (3 in) long, and branches in an uneven, forked pattern (anisotomic-dichotomous). The trunk is the same color as the branches, and the branches are mostly round in cross-section (terete), tapering and only slightly irregular. The side branches are typically not, or only slightly, narrowed where they attach to the main branch. The surface bears few to many small papillae, and it is often densely covered with short, thin fibrils (to about 3 mm).

Soralia develop mainly on the terminal branches and tend to expand rapidly until they reach the branch diameter; they may be flat to strongly hollowed out, often forming a cuff-like ring that can expose the central axis. The granular propagules produced in the soralia (isidiomorphs) range from few to abundant and may remain short or grow into isidiofibrils, which then mix with the fibrils on the branch surface. In internal structure the cortex is relatively thick and shiny (about 8.5–10% of the branch width), and the medulla is dense with an orange pigmented layer just below the cortex. Apothecia and pycnidia (sexual and asexual fruiting bodies, respectively) were not observed in the type material studied.

The medulla reacts K+ (yellow turning red) and P+ (yellow to orange). Reported lichen substances include usnic acid along with salazinic, galbinic, and norstictic acids.

=== Similar species ===
In the Galápagos, Usnea grandisora can be confused with U. dorogawensis because both have an orange-red subcortical pigment layer and large, deeply hollowed out soralia. U. grandisora is separated by its larger thallus (typically more than 3 cm (1.2 in) long), papillate branches with short, spiny (spinulose) fibrils that are densely but unevenly distributed, a moderately thick cortex, and the presence of galbinic acid. U. dorogawensis is smaller with smoother branches, a thinner cortex, a laxer medulla, and lacks galbinic acid.

== Habitat and distribution ==
Usnea grandisora is known from the Galápagos Islands, where it grows mainly on bark (trees and shrubs) and also on wood such as fenceposts, typically in open habitats of the transition and humid zones at about 300–600 m elevation. Records are from Santa Cruz, Isabela, and San Cristóbal, and the species has been collected both in open woodlands and at disturbed sites such as farmland edges where it can occur on isolated trees or fence lines.

When it was described, U. grandisora was thought to be endemic to the archipelago, but a later study reported a single specimen from the Venezuelan Andes (Mérida, La Carbonera, El Pedregal) collected at about 1,950 m (6,400 ft). Because it has been collected only rarely, it has been suggested that the species may be overlooked both in the Galápagos and on the mainland.

== See also ==
- List of Usnea species
