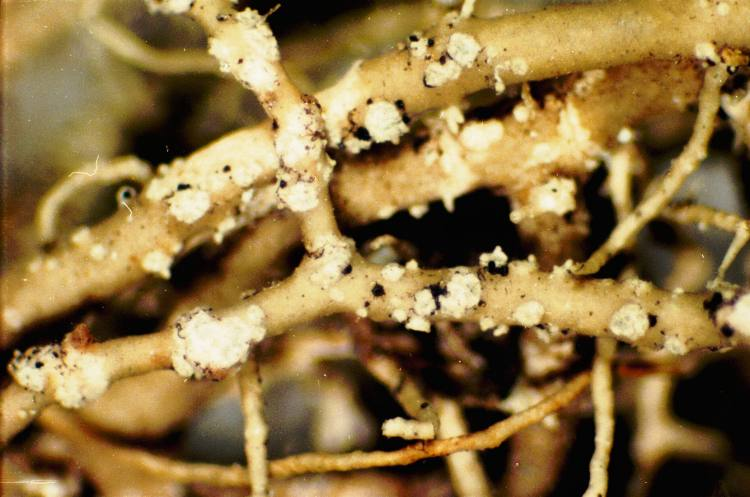

Conservation status
- Secure (NatureServe)

Scientific classification
- Kingdom: Fungi
- Division: Ascomycota
- Class: Lecanoromycetes
- Order: Lecanorales
- Family: Parmeliaceae
- Genus: Usnea
- Species: U. fulvoreagens

Binomial name
- Usnea fulvoreagens (Räsänen) Räsänen (1935)

Synonyms
- Usnea glabrescens var. fulvoreagens Räsänen (1931)

= Usnea fulvoreagens =

Species of lichen in the family Parmeliaceae

Usnea fulvoreagens is a species of beard lichen in the family Parmeliaceae. The lichen has a shrubby thallus that is richly branched, and bases that are blackened. The presence of norstictic acid is often used to differentiate this species from other similar species. It has a widespread distribution in Europe.

== Taxonomy ==
It was first described by Finnish lichenologist Veli Räsänen in 1931 as a variety of Usnea glabrescens. He raised it to distinct species status in 1935.

In 2002, Pekka Halonen and Teuvo Ahti proposed the conservation of Usnea fulvoreagens with a conserved type, to address discrepancies between the original Estonian material and the widely accepted species concept. This proposal, aimed at correcting issues with prior lectotypification attempts by Józef Motyka, which used non-original Finnish material now located in Russia, was initially met with ambiguity due to morphological differences among specimens on the proposed type sheet. After further clarification by Ahti, identifying a specific specimen as the conserved type, the Nomenclature Committee for Fungi supported the proposal more than two decades later, recognising the need for consistency in the taxonomic identification of this species.

== Description ==
Usnea fulvoreagens forms a predominantly erect thallus (main body) that occasionally becomes partly hanging (subpendent) or rarely completely hanging (pendent). It typically grows to about 10–15 cm in length. The thallus can be sparsely to richly branched, with branches sometimes arranged in a very dense pattern. Its branching structure is mainly isotomic-dichotomous, meaning the dividing branches tend to be of similar thickness. The branches are normally slender, measuring up to 1.3–1.8 mm in diameter, and often feature curved tips. A distinctive characteristic is the presence of annular cracks (ring-like breaks in the surface) that are fairly abundant and frequently accompanied by thick, white, medullary rings (where the inner tissue protrudes through the cracks). The base of the thallus is distinctly blackened, a feature that helps distinguish it from some related species.

Anatomically, U. fulvoreagens has a relatively thick cortex (outer protective layer), comprising 8–11–15% of the branch radius. The medulla (inner layer) is lax to dense and generally thin, constituting 8–14–20% of the branch radius. The central axis (core strand) is relatively thick to thick, making up 38–50–58% of the branch diameter. The surface of the branches features papillae (small wart-like protuberances), which are usually cylindrical and abundant on the main branches. Fibrils (small, hair-like branches) range from numerous to very dense, though they are rarely sparse.

One of the defining characteristics of U. fulvoreagens is its soralia (structures containing vegetative reproductive propagules). When mature, these soralia are deeply excavate (hollowed out) with torn cortex around them, and they often merge together. They produce farinose (flour-like) soredia (powdery propagules for asexual reproduction). Unlike some related species, U. fulvoreagens lacks isidia (another type of vegetative propagule).

The species is closely related to Usnea glabrescens but can be distinguished by its typically smaller, more divergent thallus, usually more abundant branches and fibrils, often taller papillae, and soralia that tend to be confluent and deeply excavate when mature. Additionally, annular cracks with thick white medullary rings are more common in U. fulvoreagens, and the species rarely produces salazinic acid, which is frequently present in U. glabrescens.

== Habitat and distribution ==
Usnea glabrata is a corticolous (bark-dwelling) species with a widespread distribution across Europe. It can be found throughout much of the continent, including Western European countries (Belgium, Ireland, Great Britain—specifically Scotland, France, Netherlands, Luxembourg, Portugal, and Spain); Central European nations (Austria, Czech Republic, Germany, Hungary, Poland, Slovakia—where it's probably extinct, Slovenia, and Switzerland); Northern European countries (Estonia, Finland, Latvia, Lithuania, Norway, and Sweden); Eastern European regions (Bulgaria, Romania, Ukraine); and extends into Russia (particularly the northern and central parts, as well as the Caucasus region).

== See also ==
- List of Usnea species
