= Usnea moreliana =

Scientific classification
- Kingdom: Fungi
- Division: Ascomycota
- Class: Lecanoromycetes
- Order: Lecanorales
- Family: Parmeliaceae
- Genus: Usnea
- Species: U. moreliana

Binomial name
- Usnea moreliana Motyka (1938)

Synonyms
- Usnea rubricornuta Truong & P.Clerc (2011)

Species of lichen-forming fungus

Usnea moreliana is a species of beard lichen in the family Parmeliaceae. It has an erect, shrubby growth form reaching about 10 cm (4 in) long and often has an overall reddish tinge due to pigment in the outer layer. The species bears minute soralia (powdery patches that release soredia) and has a chemistry dominated by unidentified triterpenoids, along with usnic acid. It occurs from Mexico through the tropical Andes to Brazil and Argentina, growing mainly on tree bark in open montane habitats.

== Taxonomy ==
Usnea moreliana was described by Józef Motyka in 1938, based on material collected in 1910 from Cerro San Miguel near Morelia, Mexico. The holotype was reported to be in the herbarium of the Berlin Botanical Garden and Botanical Museum (B) but appears to be missing. Camille Truong and Philippe Clerc later lectotypified the name using material housed at Maria Curie-Skłodowska University, Lublin, Poland (selecting specimen LUB127 as the lectotype.

In 2011, Truong and Clerc described Usnea rubricornuta in a study of red-pigmented Usnea from the tropical Andes and the Galápagos. In a later revision, they found that Motyka's original material of U. moreliana matched U. rubricornuta in morphology and chemistry (including a reddish cortex and a K− medulla with triterpenoid), and they therefore resurrected the earlier name U. moreliana as the correct name for the species and placed U. rubricornuta in synonymy.

In the original treatment (as U. rubricornuta), the species was compared with Usnea cornuta, which can look similar but lacks true red cortical pigmentation. U. moreliana (as circumscribed in that work) was defined by a combination of inflated branches that narrow where side branches join, a shiny, thin cortex with red pigment mainly inside the cortex, minute soralia that usually stay small, and a distinctive chemistry dominated by unidentified triterpenoids detected by thin-layer chromatography.

In a revision of shrubby, esorediate (soredia-lacking) Brazilian Usnea, Gerlach and coauthors reported an uncommon taxon they treated as Usnea cf. moreliana (bearing apothecia). They suggested it most likely represents the fertile counterpart of U. moreliana sensu stricto, but noted that they were unable to obtain DNA sequences and that more material and molecular study are needed before firm taxonomic decisions can be made.

== Description ==
The thallus is erect-shrubby (rarely somewhat hanging) and reaches about 10 cm (4 in) long, often with an overall reddish tinge. Branching is unevenly forked; the trunk is usually the same color as the branches (rarely darkened for the first millimeter), and the branches taper, with terete segments that may be slightly to strongly swollen. Side branches are typically narrowed at their attachment points, and shallow pits (foveoles) are uncommon; pale spots (maculae) were not reported.

The surface is often roughened by papillae and bears few to many long, slender fibrils scattered across the thallus. Soralia develop mainly on terminal branches and usually remain minute, though they can rarely enlarge slightly (still smaller than the branch diameter) or form clearly bounded clusters; they range from flat to slightly stalked and may become powdery at maturity. Isidiomorphs are often present (sometimes very abundant) and can occasionally lengthen into short isidiofibrils.

In cross-section, the cortex is thin (about 5.5–9% of the branch width) and shiny, with a reddish pigment layer that is often continuous but may be patchy and sometimes is easiest to see in a lengthwise cut. Only rarely does the pigment diffuse slightly into the medulla, and most pigment remains in the cortex. Apothecia were reported as rare and can be up to about 10 mm across with long cilia; spores are hyaline and obovoid. Pycnidia were not observed in the material studied.

Chemical tests of the medulla were reported as K− and P−, and thin-layer chromatography detected unidentified triterpenoids (UT6); usnic acid was also reported for the species.

== Habitat and distribution ==
Usnea moreliana grows mainly on bark, with occasional records from rock and dead wood. It has been collected in the tropical Andes in open habitats such as pastures with remnant trees, coffee plantations, shrubby matorral, and secondary montane cloud forests along roads. The species is also known from Mexico (type locality near Morelia), and it has been newly recorded from eastern South America (Brazil and Argentina), where it has been found in relatively open sites in primary forest and in Pinus plantations.

In southern and southeastern Brazil, apotheciate material treated as Usnea cf. moreliana has been recorded from Rio Grande do Sul, Paraná, Santa Catarina, São Paulo, and Rio de Janeiro. Collections were made mainly on twigs and branches (and occasionally on fences) in habitats including Araucaria forest, high-elevation grasslands (campo de altitude), and rural areas. The taxon was sometimes found growing together with U. erinacea.

== See also ==
- List of Usnea species
