= Usnea viktoriana =

Scientific classification
- Kingdom: Fungi
- Division: Ascomycota
- Class: Lecanoromycetes
- Order: Lecanorales
- Family: Parmeliaceae
- Genus: Usnea
- Species: U. viktoriana

Binomial name
- Usnea viktoriana P.Clerc & Otte (2018)
- Holotype: Val Canali, Trentino, Italy

Species of lichen-forming fungus

Usnea viktoriana is a shrubby to somewhat pendulous beard lichen in the family Parmeliaceae. It was described in 2018 by Philippe Clerc and Volker Otte from European material that had been placed in U. diplotypus or treated as an alectorialic acid chemotype. It belongs to the U. barbata–dasopoga group and was recognised as a distinct species using a combination of morphology, chemistry and DNA data. Chemically it is characterised by the secondary metabolite alectorialic acid in high concentration in the soralia, although some collections instead contain salazinic acid or show no detectable substances in the medulla.

The thallus is pale greenish to yellowish, forming tufts up to about 15 cm long with a short blackened base and branches that spread outwards and sometimes hang slightly. Branches are cylindrical or only weakly swollen, lack deep pits, and bear small papillae. Soralia start as small rounded patches on branch tips and sides but soon merge into larger, irregular, powdery masses packed with wart-like isidiomorphs and long hair-like isidiofibrils. In section the cortex is matt over a pale medulla, and the soralia react C+ and KC+ (red) because of their alectorialic acid content. Apothecia are rare and small.

Usnea viktoriana is primarily corticolous, growing on the bark of various conifers and broad-leaved trees, and only exceptionally on rock. It is frequent in montane regions between about 300 and 2,000 m in central and southern Europe, especially in spruce and mixed forests, but also occurs in more open woodland and in continental lowland forests on poor sandy soils. Records range from central and western Europe eastwards to eastern Europe, Russia, Turkey and the northern Caucasus, while the species appears to be absent from Scandinavia. It often grows with other sorediate Usnea, particularly U. substerilis, U. perplexans and U. subfloridana, but is distinguished by its shrubby to subpendulous habit, aggregated soralia with long isidiofibrils and alectorialic acid.

== See also ==
- List of Usnea species
