= Usnea austrocampestris =

Scientific classification
- Kingdom: Fungi
- Division: Ascomycota
- Class: Lecanoromycetes
- Order: Lecanorales
- Family: Parmeliaceae
- Genus: Usnea
- Species: U. austrocampestris

Binomial name
- Usnea austrocampestris Øvstedal (2012)

Species of lichen

Usnea austrocampestris is a species of beard lichen in the family Parmeliaceae. Found on the Falkland Islands, it was originally described as a new species by the lichenologist Dag Øvstedal in 2012. This mountain-dwelling lichen is in the section Neuropogon of the genus Usnea.

== See also ==
- List of Usnea species
