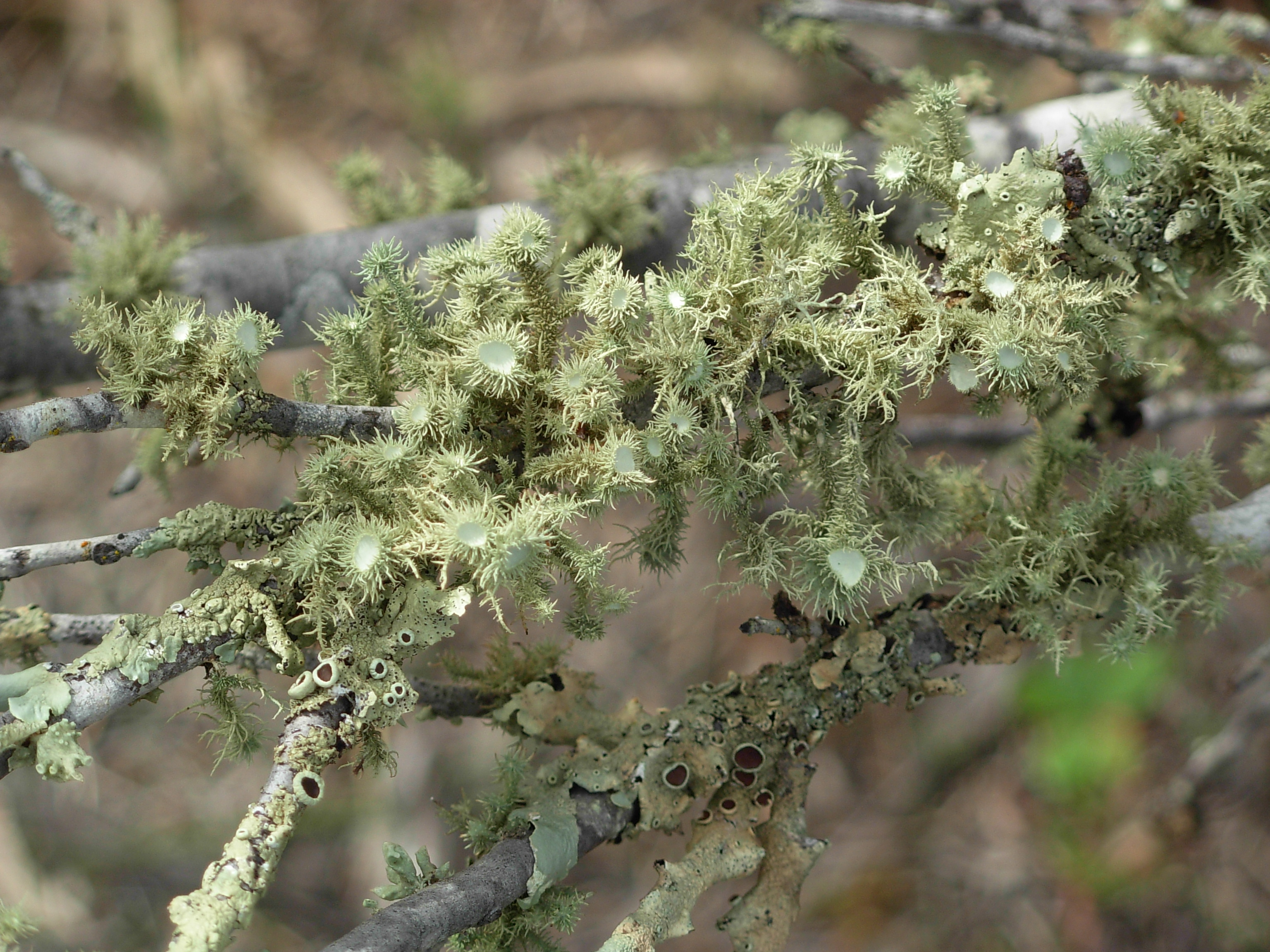

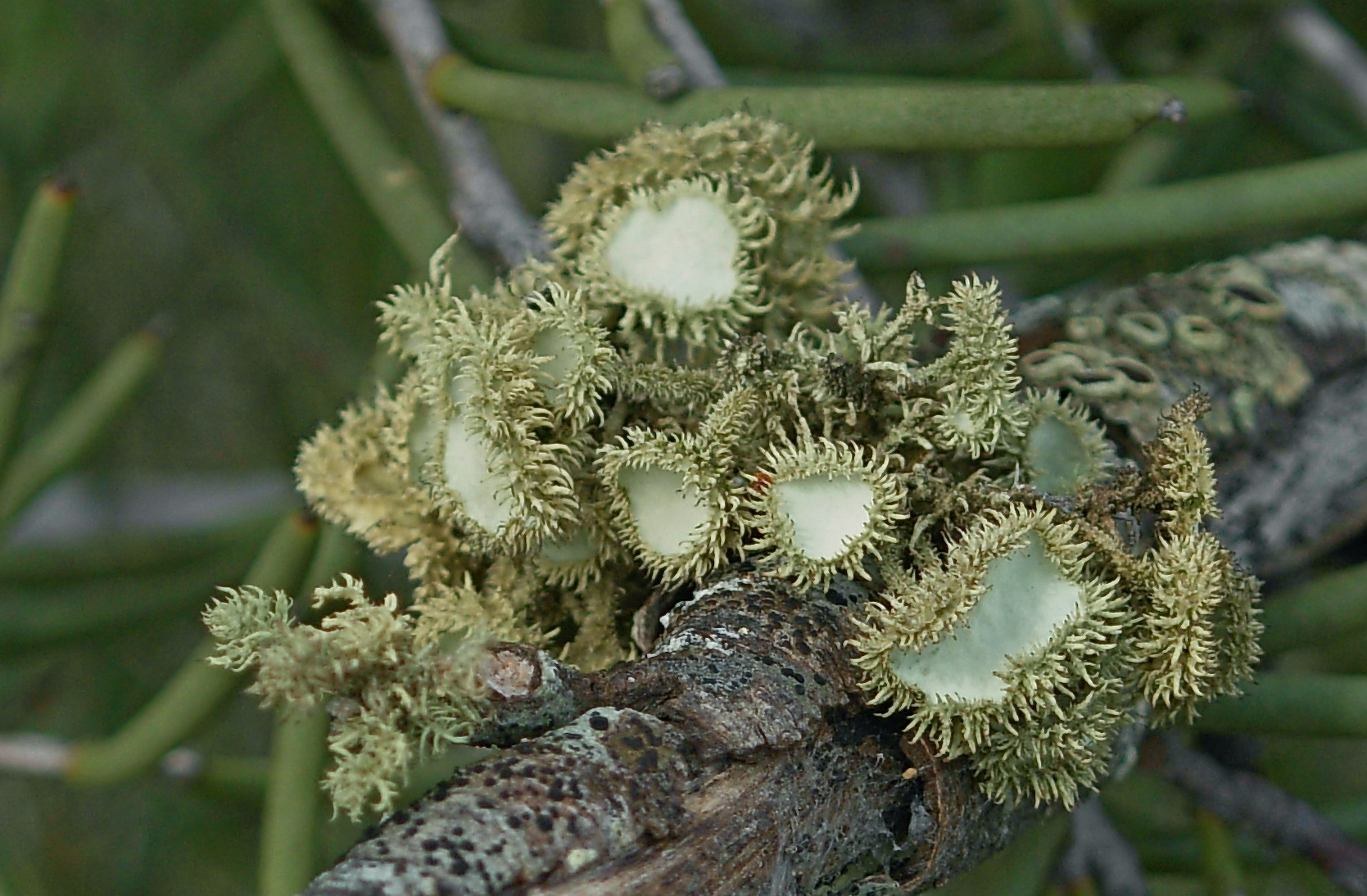

Scientific classification
- Domain: Eukaryota
- Kingdom: Fungi
- Division: Ascomycota
- Class: Lecanoromycetes
- Order: Lecanorales
- Family: Parmeliaceae
- Genus: Usnea
- Species: U. scabrida

Binomial name
- Usnea scabrida Taylor (1844)

= Usnea scabrida =

Species of fungus

Usnea scabrida is a foliose lichen that grows from holdfasts on trees. It occurs in southwest Western Australia. It is a very pale grayish-yellowish green, slender, pendant, branching from the base, unequally branching, and shrubby. The cortex contains usnic acid, and the medulla contains scabrosins. The lichen was described as a new species in 1844 by English botanist Thomas Taylor.

Usnea scabrida is endemic to Western Australia, South Australia, New South Wales and Victoria, but is also found outside Australia, and in Queensland. A subspecies Usnea scabrida subsp. elegans is found in eastern Australia.

== See also ==
- List of Usnea species
