= Usnea geissleriana =

Scientific classification
- Domain: Eukaryota
- Kingdom: Fungi
- Division: Ascomycota
- Class: Lecanoromycetes
- Order: Lecanorales
- Family: Parmeliaceae
- Genus: Usnea
- Species: U. geissleriana

Binomial name
- Usnea geissleriana P.Clerc (2006)

Species of lichen

Usnea geissleriana is a species of beard lichen in the family Parmeliaceae. It is a long, pendulous lichen found primarily in Macaronesia (the Azores and Canary Islands), where it grows in cloud forests and laurel forests. It has also been recorded from Gough Island in the South Atlantic Ocean, and several countries in South America.

== Taxonomy ==
The species was formally described by the Swiss lichenologist Philippe Clerc in 2006. Clerc named the species in honour of his colleague, the bryologist Patricia Geissler, who died in a bicycle accident.

Usnea geissleriana belongs to the family Parmeliaceae. It is closely related to Usnea flammea, but differs in several morphological and chemical characteristics.

== Description ==
Usnea geissleriana is characterized by its pendulous thallus (body) that can reach 10–25 cm in length. The lichen has a yellowish-green colour and branches in an anisotomic-dichotomous pattern, meaning its branches divide unevenly into two parts.

The base (trunk) of the lichen is pale to brownish, often with a dark reddish pigment, and displays distinct ring-like annulations (circular markings). The main branches range from 0.5 to 1.6 mm in width and are irregular in shape. They typically have conspicuous segments, and the lateral branches are not narrowed at their attachment points. The cortex (outer layer) is thin (4–7% of branch diameter), matt in appearance, and irregularly cracked, especially on the main branches. The medulla (inner layer) is thick (15–31% of branch diameter), dense, and unpigmented. The central axis comprises 26–43% of the branch diameter.

One of the distinguishing features of U. geissleriana is its soralia – small, punctiform (dot-like) structures that produce powdery propagules for asexual reproduction. These soralia are smaller than half the diameter of the branches but often coalesce, appearing like larger soralia. They arise directly on the cortex and are superficial and flat. Short isidiomorphs (finger-like projections) are frequently present on young soralia.

The lichen produces two primary chemical variants: one makes usnic, norstictic, salazinic, and protocetraric acids; the other creates usnic, stictic, constictic, cryptostictic, menegazziaic, and norstictic acids.

== Habitat and distribution ==
Usnea geissleriana is endemic to Macaronesia, specifically found on the islands of Pico in the Azores and Tenerife, La Gomera, and El Hierro in the Canary Islands. It may also occur on Las Palmas (Canary Islands) and Madeira, but this has not been confirmed.

On Pico, it has been found in high-elevation lichen-rich forests, around 1,000 m (3,300 ft), and in lower altitude stands, about 600 m (2,000 ft), growing on native shrubs including Ilex perado, Juniperus brevifolia, and Vaccinium cylindraceum. In the Canary Islands, where it appears to be more common, the species has been collected between 600 and 1,300 m (2,000 and 4,300 ft) in laurel forests (Laurisilva) and Fayal-Brezal vegetation communities. In 2011, the lichen was recorded from Gough Island in the South Atlantic Ocean. In South America, U. geissleriana occurs in Bolivia, Brazil, Ecuador, Peru, and Venezuela, where it generally grows at elevations between 2,400 and 3,200 m (7,900 and 10,500 ft).

== See also ==
- List of Usnea species
