= Usnea leana =

Scientific classification
- Domain: Eukaryota
- Kingdom: Fungi
- Division: Ascomycota
- Class: Lecanoromycetes
- Order: Lecanorales
- Family: Parmeliaceae
- Genus: Usnea
- Species: U. leana

Binomial name
- Usnea leana Bungartz, Truong & Herrera-Camp. (2018)

Species of lichen

Usnea leana is a species of fruticose lichen in the family Parmeliaceae. Found in the Galápagos Islands, it characterized by its pendulous thallus, branches covered with point-like pseudocyphellae, and the presence of galbinic acid. This lichen is currently known to be endemic to the Galápagos, with only two known localities representing its distribution.

== Taxonomy ==
Usnea leana was first described scientifically by Frank Bungartz, Camille Truong, and Maria de los Angeles Herrera-Campos as a new species in 2018. The species was named after Lea Bungartz, the daughter of the first author. The type specimen was collected in Floreana Island on January 14, 2011.

== Description ==
The thallus of Usnea leana is entangled and closely attached to its substrate by several inconspicuous hapters. Its branches are irregular in diameter and slightly inflated at the base. Pseudocyphellae are minute and most conspicuous on the basal branches. Soralia develop from pseudocyphellae on terminal branches, remaining plane and enlarging to the branch diameter at maturity. The cortex of this lichen is glossy, while the medulla is dense. The central axis is white to slightly pinkish. Neither Apothecia nor pycnidia have been observed in this species.

Usnea leana is known to contain usnic, galbinic, norstictic, and salazinic acids. The presence of galbinic acid distinguishes it from some other similar species in the region.

Usnea leana is unique among Galápagos lichens for being attached to its substrate by multiple holdfasts. It closely resembles Usnea deformis, another species found in the Galápagos, but can be distinguished by its entangled thallus, minute pseudocyphellae, and punctiform soralia. Usnea amabilis, found in the tropical Andes, also has a similar morphology but differs in terms of its pruinose cortex and chemical composition.

== Habitat and Distribution ==
Usnea leana is endemic to the Galápagos Islands and has only been found in two locations to date, representing the collection sites of the holotype and paratype specimens. The species has been found in the transition zone of the islands, in agricultural areas and rocky, open shrublands.

== See also ==
- List of Usnea species
