= Usnea poliothrix =

Scientific classification
- Domain: Eukaryota
- Kingdom: Fungi
- Division: Ascomycota
- Class: Lecanoromycetes
- Order: Lecanorales
- Family: Parmeliaceae
- Genus: Usnea
- Species: U. poliothrix

Binomial name
- Usnea poliothrix Kremp. (1874)

Usnea poliothrix is an irregular, orange species of Usnea, a common fruticose lichen. It has soralia with prominent isidiofibril growth. Its orange cortex is very fragile, and often scarred by the marks of lost isidiofibrils. Although often characterized in literature as U. poliotrix, it was officially named U. poliothrix in 1874 by German lichenologist August von Krempelhuber.

== Habitat ==
U. poliothrix is native to Madagascar, and is rarely found on the continents, and when so, in South America or Australia. Isolates may also be found in Southern-most North America. Evidence may suggest that this species was once prevalent across dry areas of the continents, and that the Galapagos Islands may serve as a final remaining location where U. poliothrix is a strong competitor.

== See also ==
- List of Usnea species
