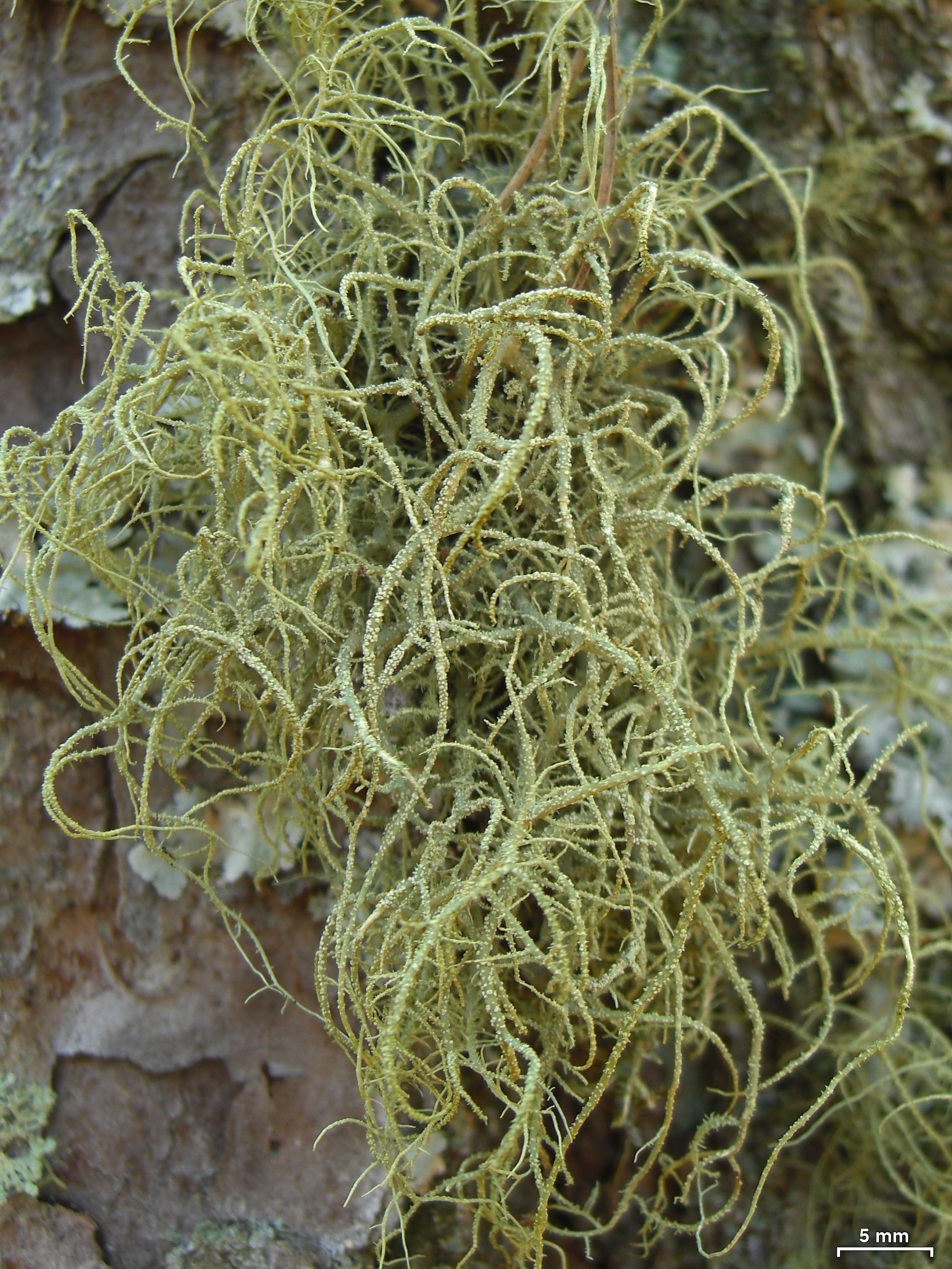
- In Delmarva

Conservation status
- Secure (NatureServe)

Scientific classification
- Kingdom: Fungi
- Division: Ascomycota
- Class: Lecanoromycetes
- Order: Lecanorales
- Family: Parmeliaceae
- Genus: Usnea
- Species: U. mutabilis

Binomial name
- Usnea mutabilis Stirt. (1881)

= Usnea mutabilis =

Species of lichen

Usnea mutabilis is a grayish-yellowish pale green, unequally branching, shrubby (fruticose) 3–7 cm long lichen commonly anchored on holdfasts on trees, mostly in eastern North America, sometimes in chaparral shrubs or pines in California. It is darker green than other members of the genus Usnea. The surface is covered with isolated, or clusters of, isidia. It lacks apothecia.

The common name is bloody beard lichen. The thick axis and medulla are dull red.

== See also ==
- List of Usnea species
