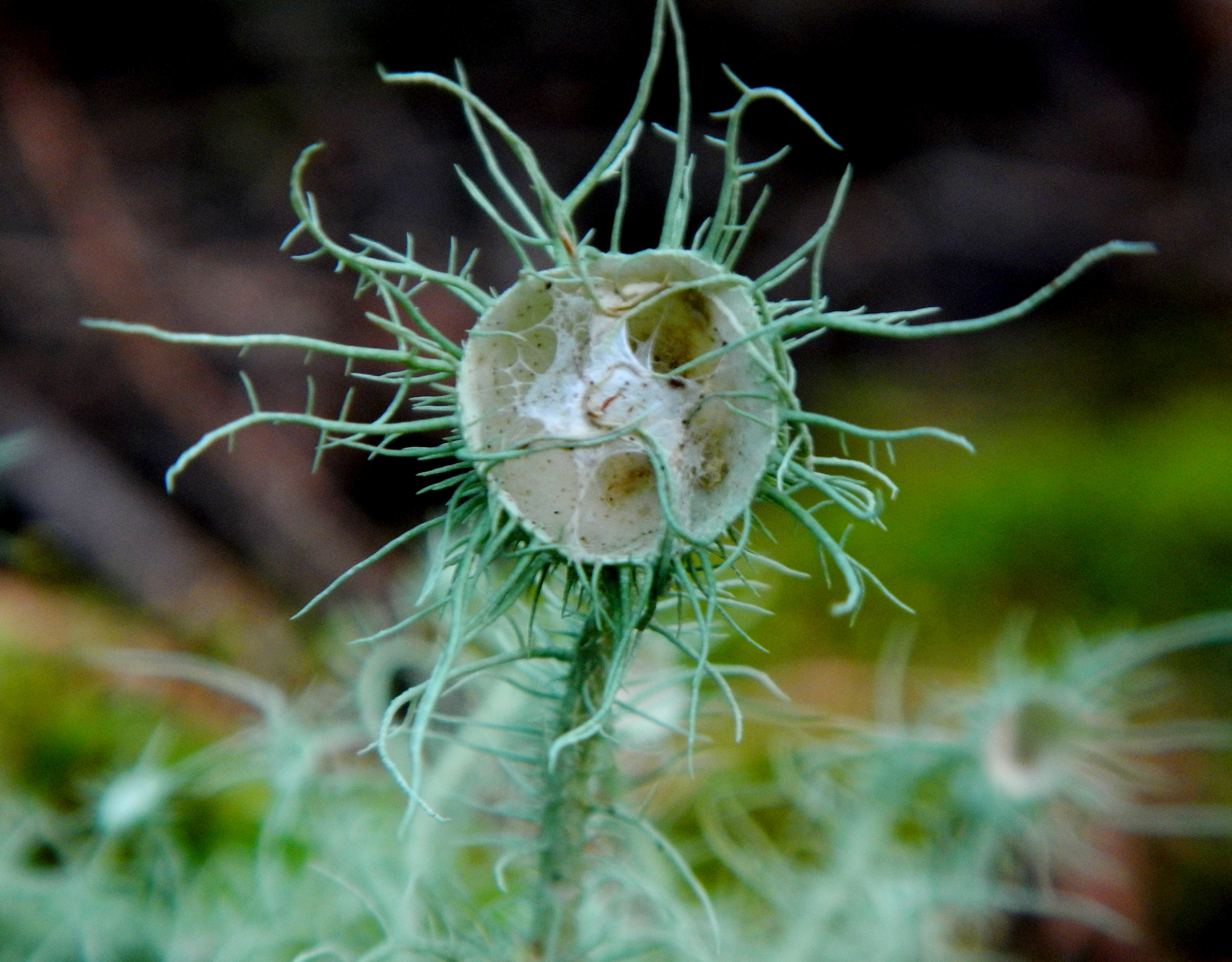

Conservation status
- Secure (NatureServe)

Scientific classification
- Kingdom: Fungi
- Division: Ascomycota
- Class: Lecanoromycetes
- Order: Lecanorales
- Family: Parmeliaceae
- Genus: Usnea
- Species: U. intermedia

Binomial name
- Usnea intermedia (A.Massal.) Jatta (1909)

Synonyms
- Usnea barbata var. intermedia A.Massal. (1856)

= Usnea intermedia =

Species of lichen

Usnea intermedia, the western bushy beard, is a grayish-yellowish pale green, irregularly much-branching, stiff shrubby fruticose lichen commonly anchored on holdfasts on trees, often on oaks. Abundant apothecia are convex discs with a ring or thallus-like margin having tendril-like fringe radiating from it. It was formerly called U. arizonica in North America.

== See also ==
- List of Usnea species
