= Usnea glabrescens =

Conservation status
- Secure (NatureServe)

Scientific classification
- Kingdom: Fungi
- Division: Ascomycota
- Class: Lecanoromycetes
- Order: Lecanorales
- Family: Parmeliaceae
- Genus: Usnea
- Species: U. glabrescens

Binomial name
- Usnea glabrescens (Nyl. ex Vain.) Vain. (1925)

Synonyms
- Usnea barbata var. glabrescens Nyl. ex Vain. (1878)

Species of lichen in the family Parmeliaceae

Usnea glabrescens is a species of beard lichen in the family Parmeliaceae. It grows on bark, has a shrubby thallus with a blackened base, and a thick cortex. Several chemotypes of this species have been reported. The lichen is widely distributed in Europe.

== Description ==
Usnea glabrescens is a shrubby to pendulous lichen measuring 3–10 (sometimes up to 15) cm in height. It grows in a somewhat upright manner at the base but typically becomes more hanging (pendulous) towards the tips. The main branches can reach up to 1.5 mm in diameter and are often abundantly branched and crowded near the base, with long side branches extending outward. The lichen typically has few or no fibrils (small, hair-like branches). The surface colour is grey-green or yellow-grey, with a characteristic blackening at the base.

The main branches give rise to thinner branches that are densely covered with small papillae (wart-like protrusions) arranged in an even pattern, while the main branches themselves appear smooth. A distinctive feature of this lichen is its conspicuous and numerous soralia—specialised structures for vegetative reproduction. These soralia are rounded and even to slightly tuberculate (bumpy) or regularly shaped and distinctively rounded. They never exceed half of the branch diameter, remain discrete, and occasionally form paler eroded patches. The soralia exclusively produce soredia (powdery propagules) rather than other reproductive structures.

Three chemical variants (chemotypes) of this species exist, which can be identified by chemical spot tests:

- Type A: The medulla (inner layer) is C−, K+ (yellow to blood-red), KC−, and Pd+ (orange). This chemotype contains usnic, norstictic, and stictic acids.
- Type B: Is C−, K+ (yellow to blood-red), Pd+ (yellow to orange). This chemotype contains norstictic and salazinic acids.
- Type C: Is C−, K−, and KC−, but turns yellow with Pd (Pd+ yellow). This chemotype contains usnic and psoromic acids.

This species differs from somewhat pendulous forms of Usnea subfloridana by having small, rounded, somewhat excavate soralia that always lack isidiomorphs, in contrast to the abrasions left by shed isidiomorphs in U. subfloridana. Chemical composition also helps differentiate between these species.

== Habitat and distribution ==
Usnea glabrescens is primarily epiphytic, growing on a variety of tree species. In East Fennoscandia, it has been documented most frequently on Betula, Picea, and Alnus, with less common occurrences on Pinus, Sorbus, Populus, Salix, Prunus, Larix, and Juniperus. It occasionally grows on dead wood (lignum) and rarely on rocks. The species favours various forest types but typically avoids dry sites. Unlike some related Usnea species such as U. fulvoreagens and U. wasmuthii, U. glabrescens is relatively less common in inhabited areas and is more restricted to old-growth forests.

Usnea glabrescens has a wide distribution across East Fennoscandia, occurring in most biogeographical provinces of Finland and adjacent areas of Russia. It becomes increasingly rare, however, in northern regions. On a global scale, U. glabrescens has an incompletely circumpolar distribution from northern boreal to temperate regions. It is widely distributed throughout Europe, though outside of Fennoscandia it is primarily found in alpine and more continental areas.

== See also ==
- List of Usnea species
