= List of Usnea species =

This is a list of species in the fruticose lichen genus Usnea, commonly known as "beard lichens". As of March 2025, Species Fungorum (in the Catalogue of Life) accepts 128 species of Usnea, although many more have been described throughout the genus's extensive taxonomic history. The fungal nomenclatural authority Index Fungorum lists nearly 2,000 taxa that have ever been associated with the genus, including forms, varieties, and subspecies, as well as numerous obsolete names, synonyms, misapplied names, and taxa temporarily placed in Usnea but later transferred to other genera. This significant discrepancy between accepted species and total published names reflects the complex taxonomic history of the genus. Ongoing revisions with molecular phylogenetics and morphological studies continue to refine the understanding of Usnea species boundaries.

== A ==
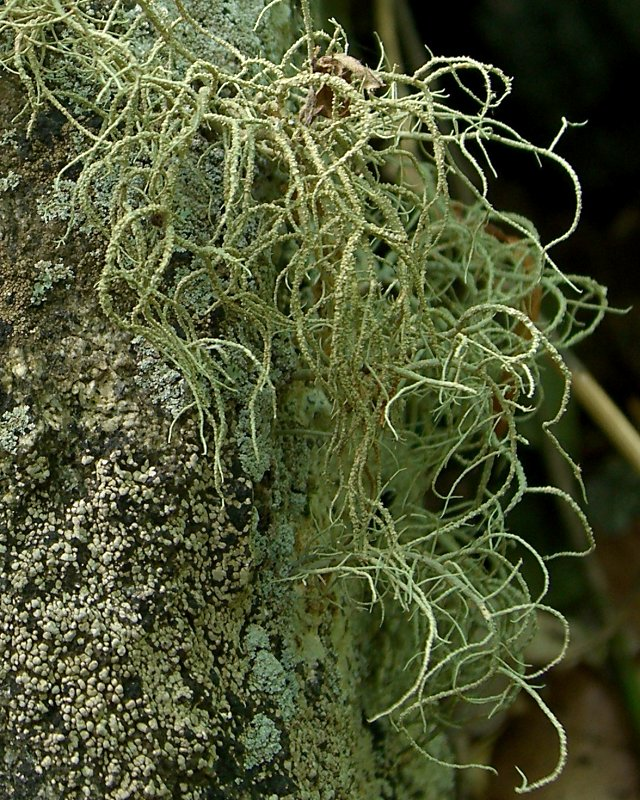
Usnea amblyoclada

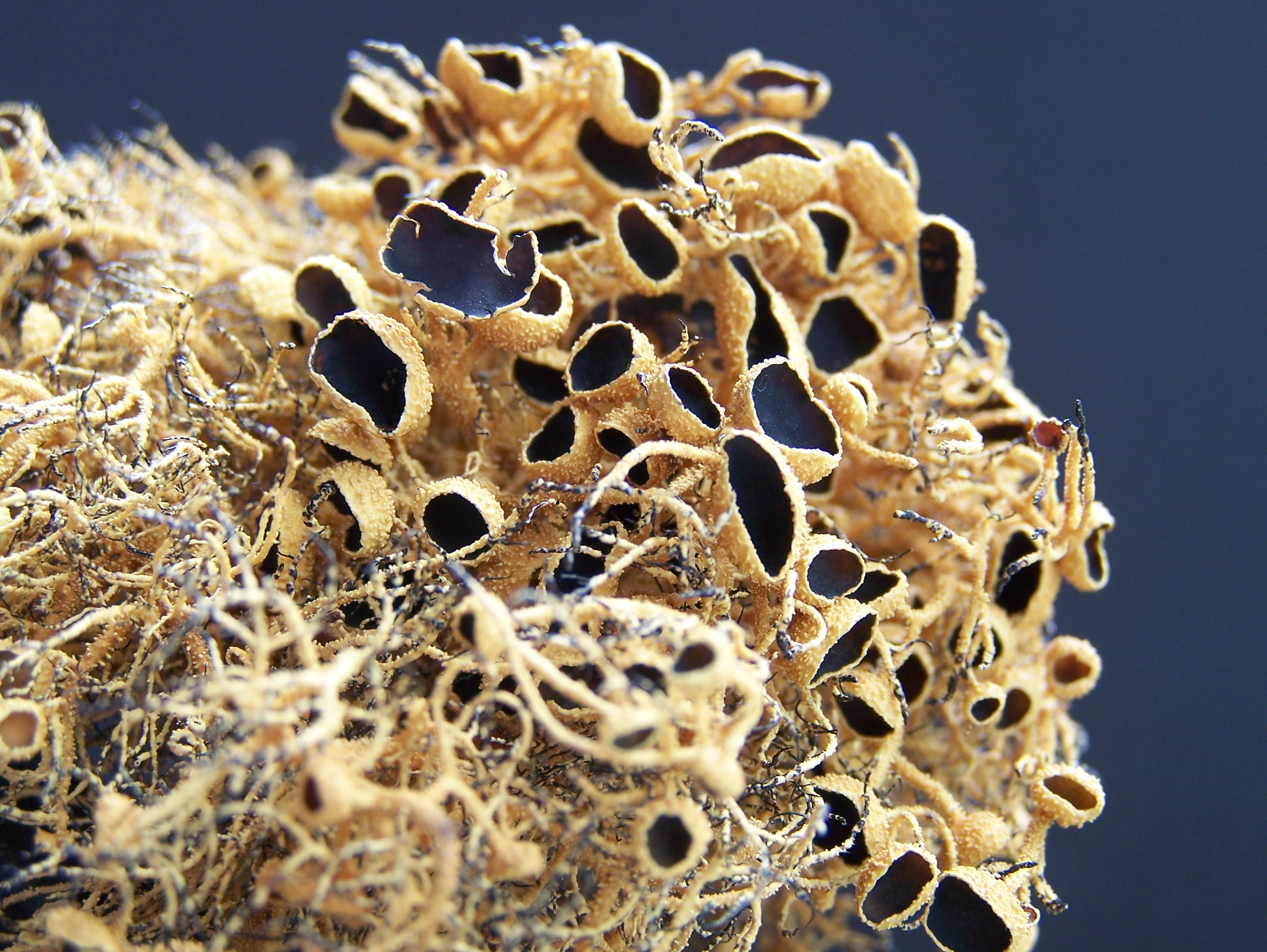
Usnea antarctica

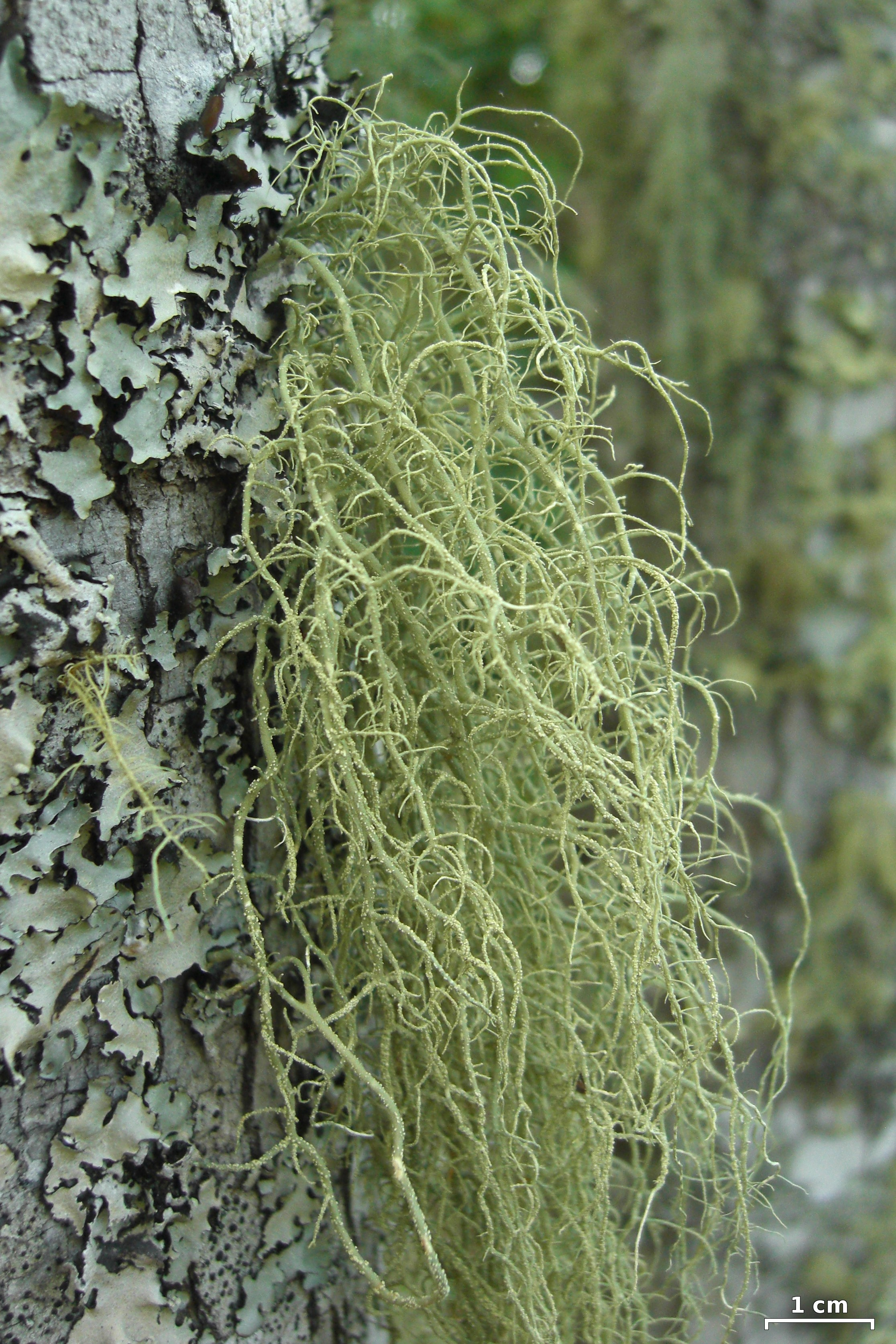
Usnea ceratina

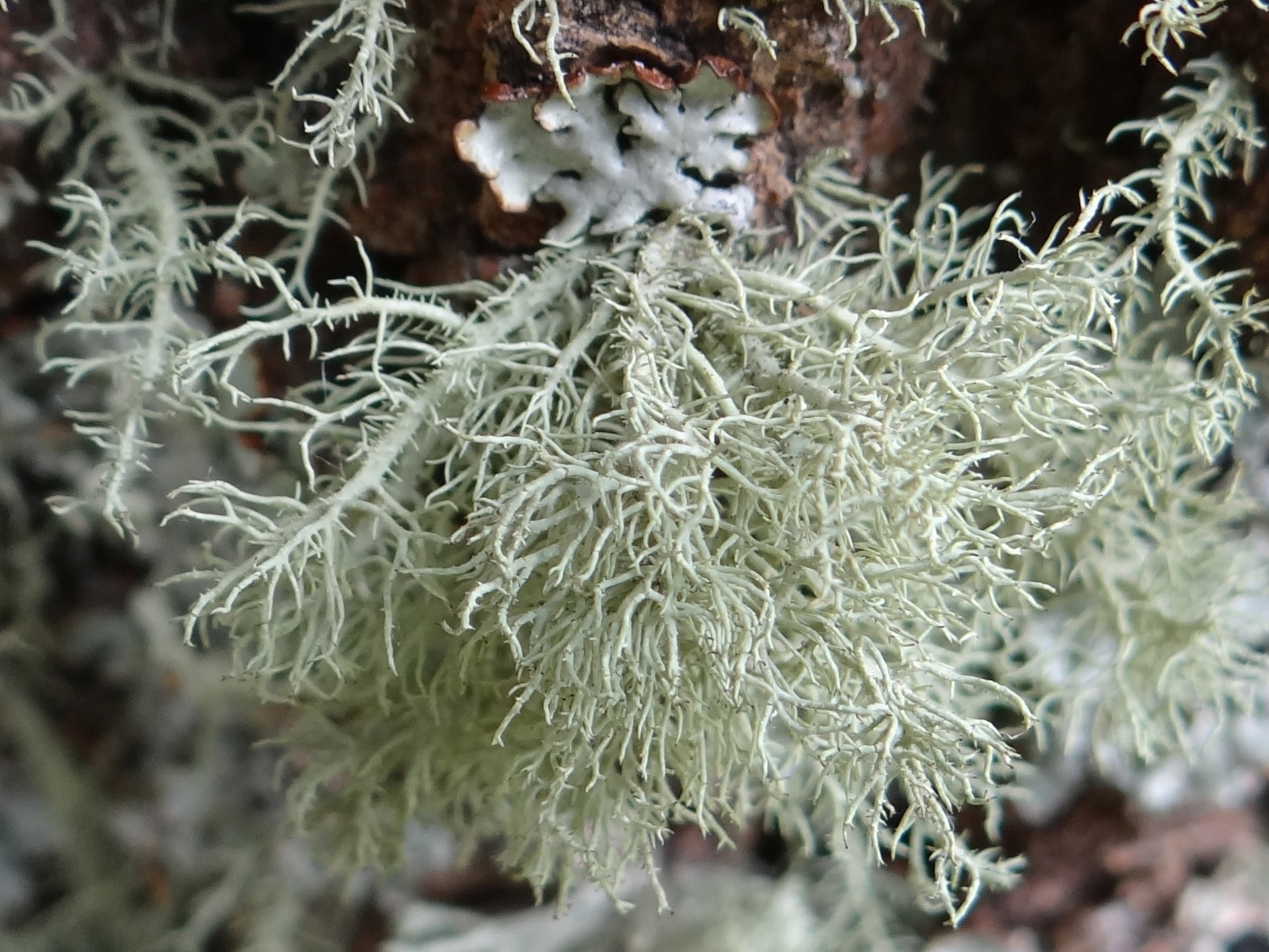
Usnea hirta

- Usnea acromelana Stirt. (1898)
- Usnea alboverrucata G.N.Stevens (1999)
- Usnea amblyoclada (Müll.Arg.) Zahlbr. (1930)
- Usnea angulata Ach. (1814)
- Usnea antarctica Du Rietz (1926)
- Usnea aranea Truong & P.Clerc (2016)
- Usnea articulata (L.) Hoffm. (1796)
- Usnea aurantiaciparvula A.Gerlach & P.Clerc (2017)
- Usnea austrocampestris Øvstedal (2012) – Falkland Islands

== B ==
- Usnea barbata (L.) F.H.Wigg. (1780)
- Usnea beckeri P.Clerc & Nadel (2022)
- Usnea bismolliuscula Zahlbr. (1930)
- Usnea boomiana P.Clerc (2015)
- Usnea brattiae P.Clerc (2007)

== C ==
- Usnea cavernosa Tuck. (1850)
- Usnea cedrosiana P.Clerc (2007)
- Usnea ceratina Ach. (1810)
- Usnea chaetophora Stirt. (1883)
- Usnea cirrosa Motyka (1937)
- Usnea clerciana Truong (2016)
- Usnea confusa Asahina (1956)
- Usnea cornuta Körb. (1859)
- Usnea crenulata Truong & P.Clerc (2013)
- Usnea crocata Truong & P.Clerc (2011)
- Usnea cylindrica P.Clerc (2011)

== D ==
- Usnea diplotypus Vain. (1922)

== E ==
- Usnea effusa G.N.Stevens (1999)
- Usnea elata Motyka (1936)
- Usnea elixii G.N.Stevens (1991)
- Usnea esperantiana P.Clerc (1992)
- Usnea exigua J.M.Rodr. & P.Clerc (2011)

== F ==
- Usnea fibriloides A.Otero, Barcenas-Peña, Lumbsch & Grewe (2023) – Argentina
- Usnea filipendula Stirt. (1881)
- Usnea firmula (Stirt.) Motyka (1936)
- Usnea flammea Stirt. (1881)
- Usnea flavocardia Räsänen (1936)
- Usnea flavorubescens Truong & P.Clerc (2012)
- Usnea fleigiae A.Gerlach & P.Clerc (2017)
- Usnea florida (L.) Weber ex F.H.Wigg. (1780)
- Usnea floriformis C.W.Dodge (1948)
- Usnea foveata Vain. (1928)
- Usnea fragilescens Hav. ex Lynge (1921)
- Usnea fulvoreagens (Räsänen) Räsänen (1935)

== G ==
- Usnea galapagona Truong & P.Clerc (2011) – Galápagos Islands
- Usnea geissleriana P.Clerc (2006)
- Usnea glabrata (Ach.) Vain. (1915)
- Usnea glabrescens (Nyl. ex Vain.) Vain. (1922)
- Usnea glauca Motyka (1930)
- Usnea grandisora Truong & P.Clerc (2011)
- Usnea grandispora A.Gerlach & P.Clerc (2017)

== H ==
- Usnea himantodes Stirt. (1883)
- Usnea hirta (L.) Weber ex F.H.Wigg. (1780)

== I ==
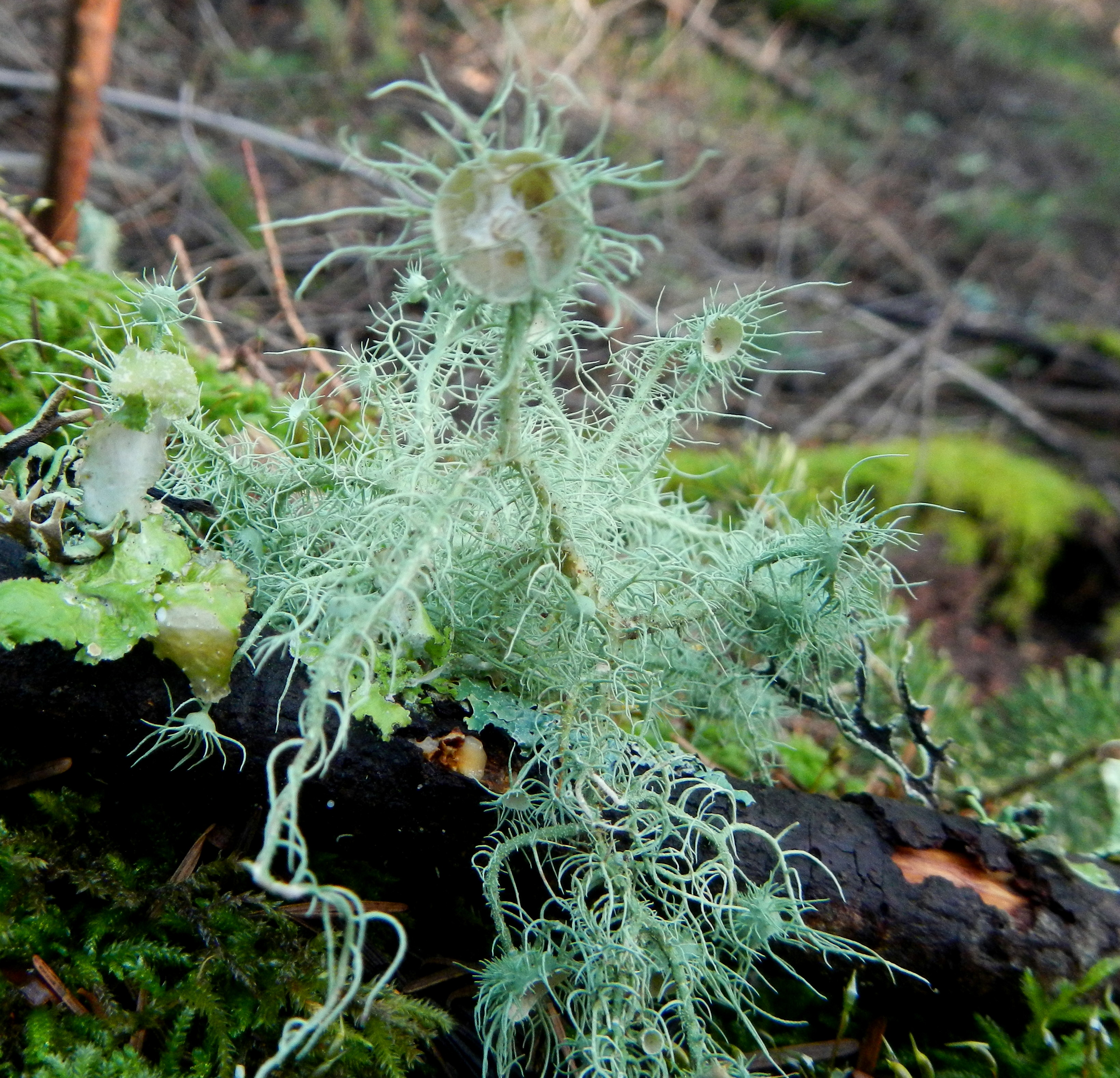
Usnea intermedia

- Usnea inermis Motyka (1936)
- Usnea intermedia (A.Massal.) Jatta (1909)

== K ==
- Usnea kalbiana A.Gerlach & P.Clerc (2017)
- Usnea krogiana P.Clerc (2006)

== L ==
- Usnea lambii (Imshaug) Wirtz & Lumbsch (2011)
- Usnea lapponica Vain. (1922)
- Usnea leana Bungartz, Truong & Herrera-Camp. (2018)
- Usnea longiciliata P.Clerc & Nadel (2022)
- Usnea lutii J.M.Rodr. & P.Clerc (2011)

== M ==
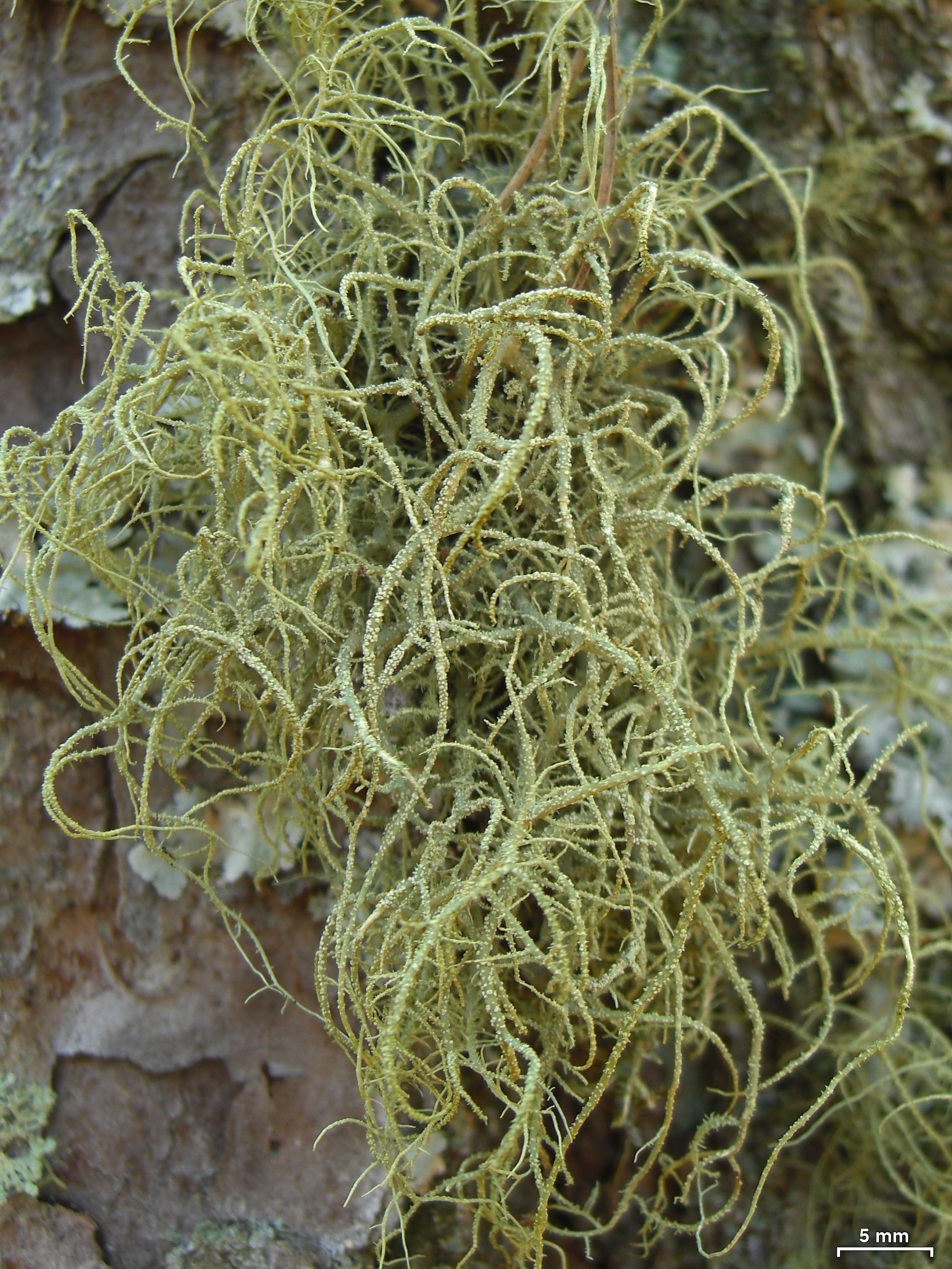
Usnea mutabilis

- Usnea macaronesica P.Clerc (2006)
- Usnea maculata Stirt. (1882)
- Usnea marivelensis (Vain.) Motyka (1937)
- Usnea mayrhoferi Herrera-Camp., Bungartz, Truong & P.Clerc (2018) – Galápagos Islands
- Usnea mekista (Stirt.) G.Awasthi (1985)
- Usnea messutiae Wirtz & Lumbsch (2011)
- Usnea molliuscula Stirt. (1883)
- Usnea moreliana Motyka (1938)
- Usnea mutabilis Stirt. (1881)
- Usnea myrmaiacaina P.Clerc (2007)

== N ==
- Usnea neuropogonoides Motyka (1936)
- Usnea nidifica Taylor (1847)
- Usnea nidulifera Motyka (1937)

== O ==
- Usnea oncodeoides G.N.Stevens (1999)
- Usnea oncodes Stirt. (1881)
- Usnea oreophila A.Gerlach & P.Clerc (2019) – Brazil

== P ==
- Usnea pacificana Halonen (2000)
- Usnea pallidocarpa Wirtz & Lumbsch (2011)
- Usnea parafloridana K.Mark, S.Will-Wolf & T.Randlane (2016)
- Usnea patriciana Bungartz, Herrera-Camp. & P.Clerc (2018)
- Usnea pendulina Motyka (1936)
- Usnea perplexans Stirt. (1881)
- Usnea poliothrix Kremp. (1874)
- Usnea praetervisa (Asahina) P.Clerc (2004)
- Usnea propagulifera C.W.Dodge (1948)
- Usnea pulvinata Fr. (1846)
- Usnea pycnoclada Vain. (1909)
- Usnea pygmoidea (Asahina) Y.Ohmura (2011)

== Q ==
- Usnea quasirigida Lendemer & I.I.Tav. (2003)

== R ==
- Usnea ramulosissima G.N.Stevens & R.W.Rogers (1979)
- Usnea roseola Vain. (1921)
- Usnea rubicunda Stirt. (1881)
- Usnea rubriglabrata Truong & P.Clerc (2016)
- Usnea rubrotincta Stirt. (1881)

== S ==
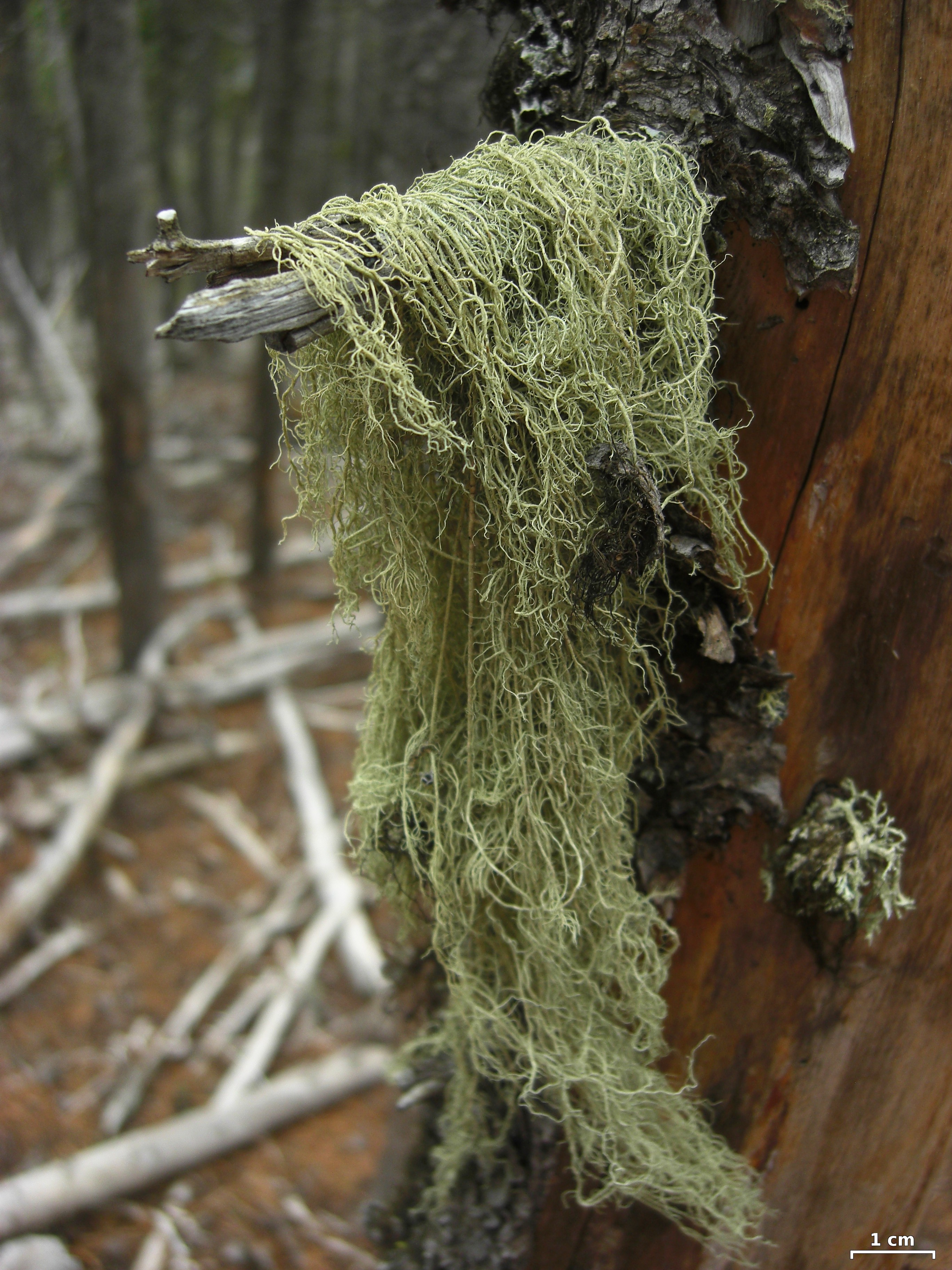
Usnea scabrata

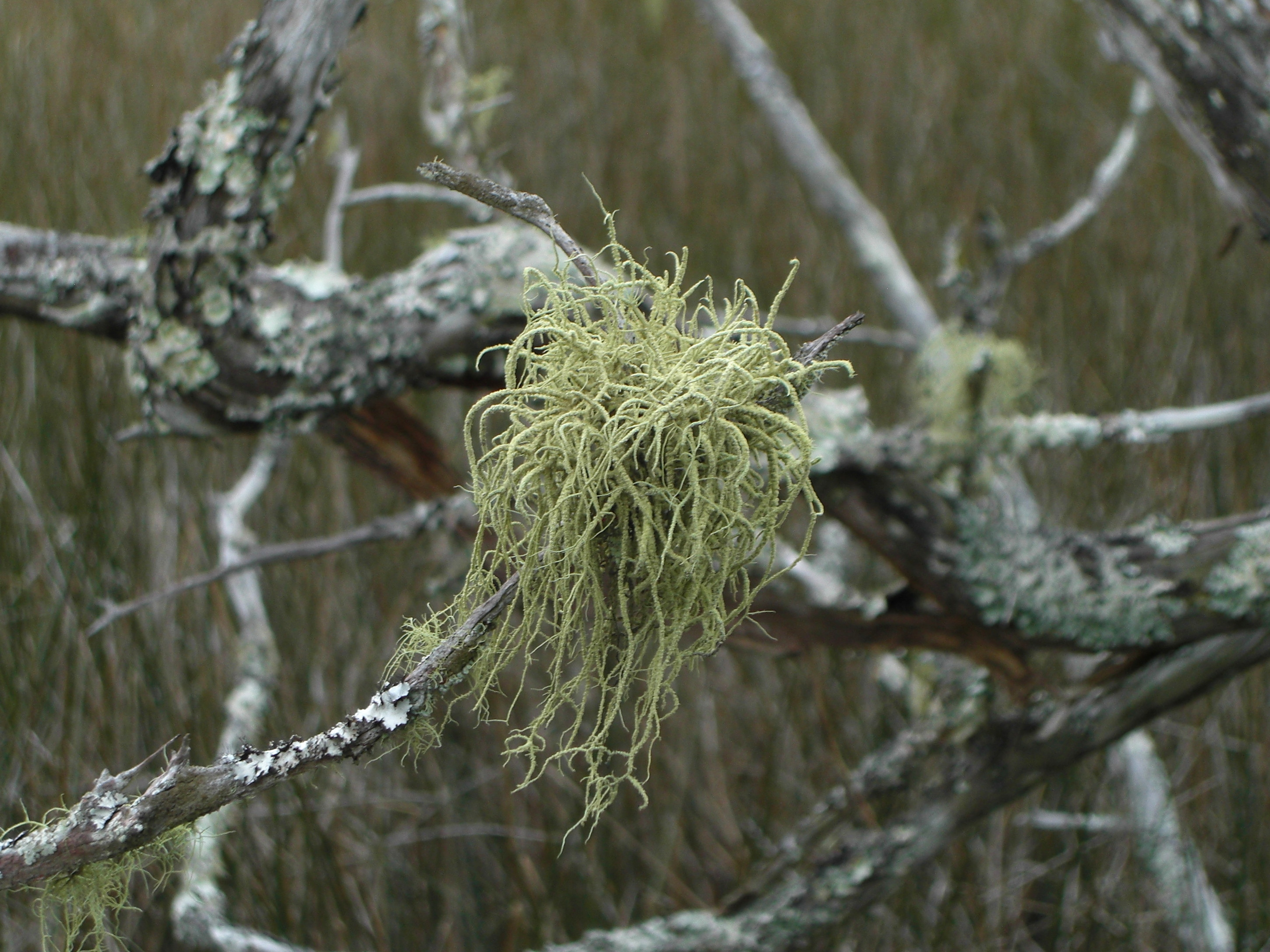
Usnea subscabrosa

- Usnea sanguinea Swinscow & Krog (1979)
- Usnea saxidilatata J.M.Rodr. & P.Clerc (2011)
- Usnea scabrata Nyl. (1875)
- Usnea scabrida Taylor (1844)
- Usnea silesiaca Motyka (1930)
- Usnea sphacelata R.Br. (1823)
- Usnea subalpina G.N.Stevens (1999)
- Usnea subaranea Truong & P.Clerc (2016)
- Usnea subcapillaris (D.J.Galloway) F.J.Walker (1985)
- Usnea subcomplecta Truong, P.Clerc & Herrera-Camp. (2018) – Galápagos Islands
- Usnea subcornuta Stirt. (1881)
- Usnea subdasaea Truong & P.Clerc (2011)
- Usnea subeciliata (Motyka) Swinscow & Krog (1979)
- Usnea subflammea P.Clerc (2006)
- Usnea subflaveola Truong & P.Clerc (2013)
- Usnea subfloridana Stirt. (1882)
- Usnea subglabrata Truong & P.Clerc (2015)
- Usnea subparvula A.Gerlach & P.Clerc (2017)
- Usnea subrubicunda P.Clerc (2011)
- Usnea subscabrosa Nyl. ex Motyka (1937)

== T ==
- Usnea tamborensis (Hepp) Motyka (1938)
- Usnea taylorii Hook.f. & Taylor (1844)
- Usnea torulosa (Müll.Arg.) Zahlbr. (1930)
- Usnea trachycarpa (Stirt.) Müll.Arg. (1889)

== U ==
- Usnea ushuaiensis (I.M.Lamb) Wirtz, Printzen & Lumbsch (2008)

== V ==
- Usnea viktoriana P.Clerc & Otte (2018)
- Usnea vrieseana Mont. & Bosch (1856)

== W ==
- Usnea wasmuthii Räsänen (1931)

== X ==
- Usnea xanthopoga Nyl. (1876)
