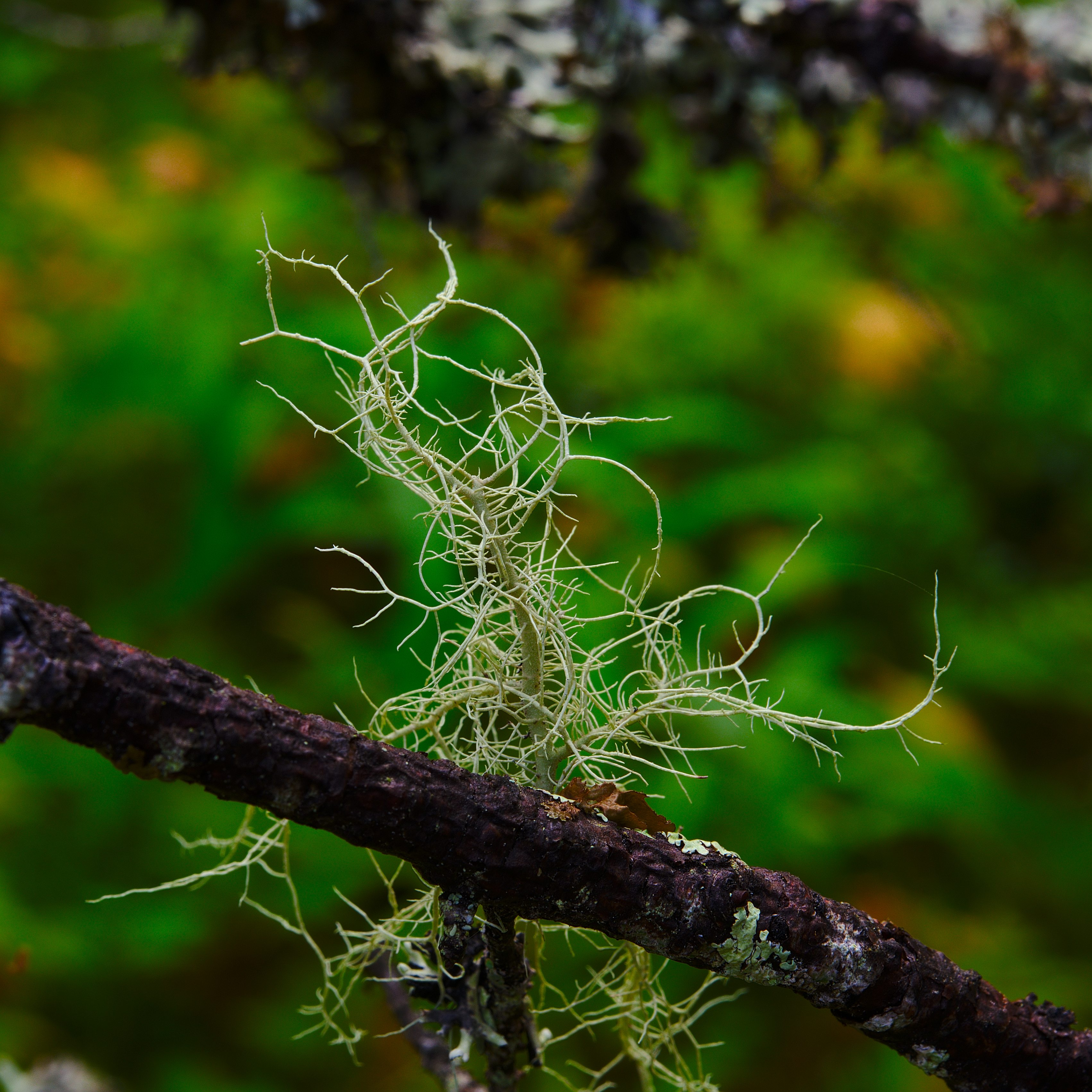

Scientific classification
- Domain: Eukaryota
- Kingdom: Fungi
- Division: Ascomycota
- Class: Lecanoromycetes
- Order: Lecanorales
- Family: Parmeliaceae
- Genus: Usnea
- Species: U. lapponica

Binomial name
- Usnea lapponica Vain. (1925)

= Usnea lapponica =

Species of lichen in the family Parmeliaceae

Usnea is a species of beard lichen in the family Parmeliaceae. It was described as a new species in 1925 by Finnish lichenologist Edvard August Vainio. The lichen has a richly branched thallus, and the branches have depressions and foveolae. It is widely distributed in Europe.

== See also ==
- List of Usnea species
