= Usnea krogiana =

Scientific classification
- Domain: Eukaryota
- Kingdom: Fungi
- Division: Ascomycota
- Class: Lecanoromycetes
- Order: Lecanorales
- Family: Parmeliaceae
- Genus: Usnea
- Species: U. krogiana

Binomial name
- Usnea krogiana P.Clerc (2006)

Species of lichen

Usnea krogiana is a species of beard lichen in the family Parmeliaceae. It is characterized by its shrubby, rigid growth form reaching 2–8 cm in length, a distinctive jet-black basal trunk with thin ring-like cracks, an extremely thick central axis (50–80% of branch diameter), small dot-like reproductive structures (soralia), and the presence of usnic acid in its outer layer and stictic acid group compounds in its inner layer. The lichen is primarily found in Macaronesia (the Azores and Canary Islands) at elevations between 280 and 1400 metres, has been collected in the West Indies, and was more recently discovered in São Tomé and Príncipe in continental Africa. It typically grows on native trees in cloud forests, on isolated trees in pastures, along roadsides, and occasionally on rock boulders.

== Taxonomy ==
The species was formally described by the Swiss lichenologist Philippe Clerc in 2006. Clerc named the species in honour of Hildur Krog, a distinguished Swedish lichenologist from Oslo who provided significant assistance to Clerc during the early stages of his studies on the genus Usnea.

Usnea krogiana belongs to the family Parmeliaceae. It is morphologically similar to Usnea columbiana from South America, but differs in various characteristics including soralia size and distribution. It also shares some features with U. flammea, U. subscabrosa, and U. silesiaca.

== Description ==
Usnea krogiana has a distinctive shrubby and rigid growth form, typically measuring 2–8 cm in length. The lichen is greyish-green in colour and branches in an anisotomic-dichotomous pattern (branches dividing into two unequal parts) near the tips.

One of its most characteristic features is the trunk, which has a sharply defined jet-black pigmentation in the basal part, with thin annular cracks (ring-like fissures). The main branches are 0.6–1.0 mm wide, tapered, and typically not narrowed at attachment points.

The cortex (outer layer) is relatively thick, making up about 8–12% of the branch diameter, with a matt (non-shiny) surface. The medulla (inner layer) is thin and compact, comprising only about 5–12% of the branch diameter. Most distinctively, the central axis is extremely thick, accounting for about 50–80% of the branch diameter, which gives the thallus its rigid structure.

The lichen produces small, punctiform (dot-like) soralia, which are reproductive structures that appear like small dots on the surface. These soralia have an irregular shape without a distinct rim, are smaller than half the diameter of the branches, slightly raised (stipitate), and arise on small protuberances (tubercles). Small, finger-like projections called isidiomorphs are frequently present on both young and mature soralia.

The primary secondary metabolites produced by U. krogiana include usnic acid in the cortex, and the stictic acid group (stictic, constictic, cryptostictic, menegazziaic, and norstictic acids) in the medulla. A rare variant with only norstictic acid has been found in the West Indies, whereas a chemotype with norstictic and salazinic acids has been found in São Tomé and Príncipe.

== Habitat and distribution ==
Usnea krogiana is a frequent species in Macaronesia (the Azores, Canary Islands) and has also been collected in the West Indies. In the Azores, it has been found on all investigated islands at elevations ranging from 280 to 1250 metres. It grows in cloud forests, on isolated shrubs or trees in pastures, or on roadsides, and is occasionally found on rock boulders. In 2022, it was reported as new to continental Africa after it was discovered on São Tomé and Príncipe growing on a shrubby species of Schefflera.

The species commonly grows on native trees such as Laurus azorica (Azores laurel), Juniperus brevifolia (Azores juniper), and Ilex perado (Azores holly). In the Canary Islands, it typically occurs at higher elevations (600–1400 metres), mainly in Fayal-Brezal vegetation with remnants of laurel forest, in pine plantations, or on isolated trees along roadsides. The most frequent host trees in the Canary Islands are Erica arborea (tree heath) and Pinus radiata (Monterey pine).

== See also ==
- List of Usnea species
