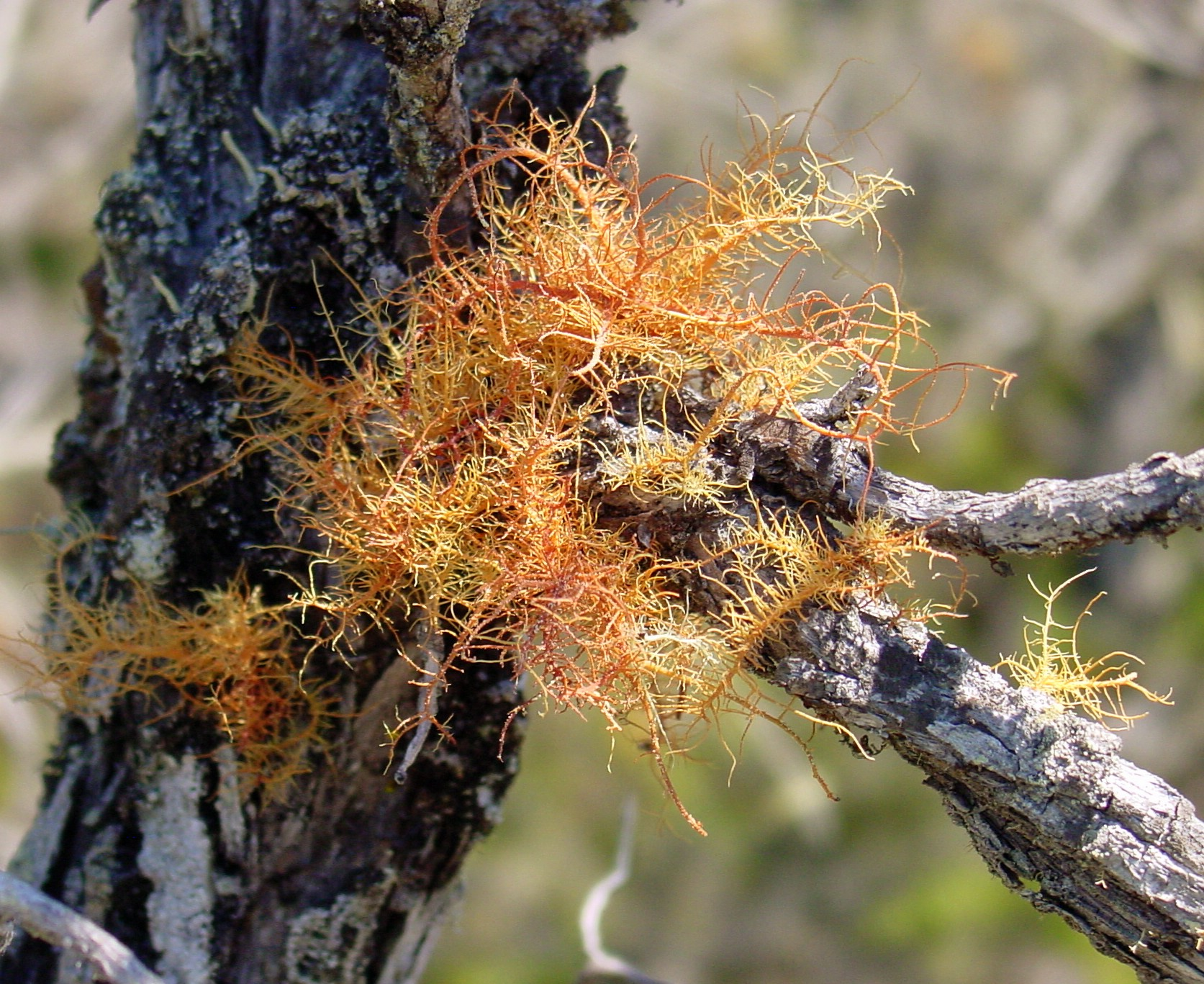

Conservation status
- Apparently Secure (NatureServe)

Scientific classification
- Kingdom: Fungi
- Division: Ascomycota
- Class: Lecanoromycetes
- Order: Lecanorales
- Family: Parmeliaceae
- Genus: Usnea
- Species: U. rubicunda

Binomial name
- Usnea rubicunda Stirt. (1881)

= Usnea rubicunda =

Species of lichen-forming fungus

Usnea rubicunda, commonly known as the red beard lichen, is a type of arboreal lichen native to temperate regions in North, Central and South America, as well as Europe, Eastern Asia, and North Africa. This fruticose species forms hair-like hanging clusters that are orange to red in color. It is at risk of extirpation in Canada.

In Nepal, Usnea rubicunda has been reported at 2,700 m elevation in a compilation of published records.

== See also ==
- List of Usnea species
