= Chemotype =

A chemotype (sometimes chemovar) is a chemically distinct grouping within a plant, bacteria or fungus species with differences in the composition of the secondary metabolites. Minor genetic and epigenetic changes with little or no visible effects may produce large changes in the chemical phenotype. Chemotypes are often defined by the most abundant chemical produced by that individual and the concept has been useful in work done by chemical ecologists and natural product chemists. With respect to plant biology, the term "chemotype" was coined by Rolf Santesson and his son Johan in 1968, defined as, "...chemically characterized parts of a population of morphologically indistinguishable individuals."

In microbiology, the term "chemoform" or "chemovar" is preferred in the 1990 edition of the International Code of Nomenclature of Bacteria (ICNB), the former referring to the chemical constitution of an organism and the latter meaning "production or amount of production of a particular chemical." Terms with the suffix -type are discouraged so as to avoid confusion with type specimens. The terms chemotype and chemovar were originally introduced to the ICNB in a proposed revision to one of the nomenclatural rules dealing with infrasubspecific taxonomic subdivisions at the 1962 meeting of the International Microbiological Congress in Montreal. The proposed change argued that nomenclatural regulation of these ranks, such as serotype and morphotype, is necessary to avoid confusion. In proposed recommendation 8a(7), it was asked that "authorization be given for the use of the terms chemovar and chemotype," defining the terms as being "used to designate an infrasubspecific subdivision to include infrasubspecific forms or strains characterized by the production of some chemical not normally produced by the type strain of the species." The change to the Code was approved in August 1962 by the Judicial Commission of the International Committee of Bacteriological Nomenclature at the VIII International Microbiological Congress in Montreal.

A good example of a plant with many polymorphic chemotypes is Thymus vulgaris. While largely indistinguishable in appearance, specimens of T. vulgaris may be assigned to one of seven different chemotypes, depending on whether the dominant component of the essential oil is thymol, carvacrol, linalool, geraniol, sabinene hydrate (thuyanol), α-terpineol, or eucalyptol. Such chemotypes may be indicated as Thymus vulgaris ct. thymol (red thyme), or Thymus vulgaris ct. geraniol (sweet thyme), etc. Such an indication has no taxonomic standing.

Because chemotypes are defined only by the most abundant secondary metabolite, they may have little practical meaning as a group of organisms sharing the same trait. Individuals of one chemotype may have vastly different chemical profiles, varying in the abundance and kind of the next most abundant chemical. This means two individuals of the same chemotype could have different impacts on herbivores, pollinators, or resistance to pests. A study by Ken Keefover-Ring and colleagues in 2008 cautioned that, "...this can be a very qualitative assessment of an individual's chemical profile, under which may be hiding significant chemical diversity."

== See also ==
- Ecotype
