= Philippe Clerc (lichenologist) =

Swiss lichenologist

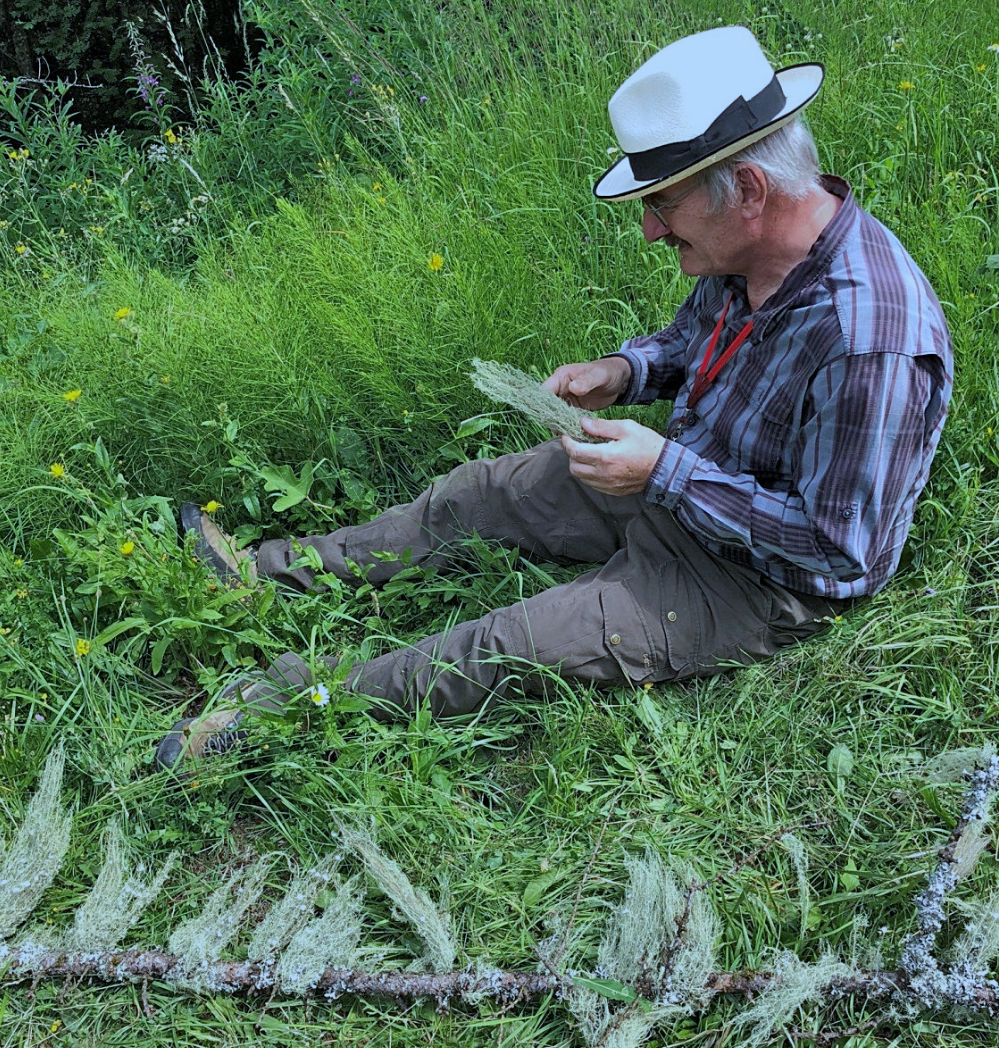
- Philippe Clerc in the Allondon valley, Switzerland, studying Usnea specimens
- Born: April 26, 1955 (age 71); Lausanne
- Education: University of Geneva; University of Bern
- Scientific career
- Fields: Lichenology
- Workplaces: Geneva Botanical Garden
- Author abbrev. (botany): P.Clerc

Philippe Clerc (born 26 April 1955) is a Swiss lichenologist. A Festschrift was dedicated to him in 2020, on the occasion of his retirement from the Geneva Botanical Garden (Jardin botaniques de Genève), where he worked from 1993 to 2020. Clerc is an authority on the beard lichens (genus Usnea), and has had nearly 100 publications on this and other topics, such as the lichen flora of Switzerland.

== Biography ==
Philippe Clerc was born in Lausanne, Switzerland, on 26 April 1955. In 1970 he attended secondary school at the Collège Calvin in Geneva. From 1974 to 1979 he studied natural science at the University of Geneva. His interest in lichenology was initiated after seeing an article about lichens and air pollution in the newspaper Tribune de Genève. To get more information about this topic, he met with professor Gilbert Turian, who informed him he would have to learn the lichen species, and lent him books and a microscope to continue his studies. Clerc completed a master's degree in biology in 1979 under the supervision of Turian. Clerc's first scientific publications, completed about this time, were on the use of lichens as bioindicators for air pollution in the Valais region of Switzerland. After this he attended the University of Bern, where from 1979–1981 he was assistant professor, and then from 1981–1986 a research assistant at the Institute of Cryptogams. Clerc initiated studies of the beard lichen genus Usnea after the Eduard Frey lichen collection had been acquired by the university. Pursuing these studies, he visited the collection of Polish lichenologist Józef Motyka in Lublin, an authority on the genus. In 1984, Clerc's first publications on this genus appeared. – around the same time he received his secondary education certificate, which qualified him to teach biology. He earned a PhD in 1986, with Klaus Ammann as his supervisor. His thesis was titled Taxonomie et systématique du genre Usnea en Europe – Études préliminaires pour une monographie ("Taxonomy and Systematics of the Genus Usnea in Europe – Preliminary Studies for a Monograph").

Between 1984 and 1990 Clerc was assistant professor at the University of Bern. In 1988–1989 he undertook a postdoctoral research fellowship at Duke University, where he worked with William Louis Culberson and Rytas Vilgalys. From 1991 to 1993 he took a National Science Foundation Graduate Research Fellowship at the Geneva Botanical Garden, where he studied the molecular phylogeny of the family Parmeliaceae, a continuation of the post-doctoral research he had initiated at Duke University. Here he established, along with Jean-François Manen, a molecular biology facility. From 1993 to 2000, Clerc was curator of the mycological collections at the Conservatory. Starting in 2000, Clerc was a docent at the faculty of natural science at the University of Geneva, and in 2008, the head curator at the Conservatory.

== Research ==
Clerc has published numerous scientific works, in particular on the lichen flora in Switzerland–including a detailed catalog of the lichens in Switzerland–and numerous revisions of species groups and regional revisions of the genus Usnea. He updated and revised Motyka's influential 1936–38 monograph, and has identified and published nearly 50 new species in that genus alone. In addition to Switzerland, Clerc has also prepared regional lichen inventories for areas in Alaska, Canary Islands, France, Italy, and Scandinavia. Other genera in which Clerc has published taxonomical work include Botryolepraria, Candelariella, Melanohalea, Melaspilea, Menegazzia, Parmelia, Parmelina, Rinodina, Tetramelas, Verrucaria, and Waynea.

His work on the molecular systematics of family Parmeliaceae helped to identify the nature of lichen chimaeras (photosymbiodemes). These are lichen fungi (mycobionts) that form morphologically and anatomically identical or different thalli with different photobionts. It had previously been thought that the mycobiont in a chimera was two species; Clerc's research helped to show that the mycobiont was a single fungal species associating with a different photobiont, and that it was the photobiont that determined the morphology of the lichen.

Clerc was involved with identifying and enumerating the lichen species found on the wall of the Promenade de la Treille, which has been deemed to be the most biodiverse in Switzerland, harbouring nearly 150 species.

== Recognition ==
A Festschrift was dedicated to Clerc in 2020, on the occasion of his retirement from the Conservatory and Botanical Garden of the City of Geneva.

=== Eponymy ===
Taxa that have been named in honour of Clerc include Pertusaria clercii Messuti & A.W.Archer (2007); Usnea clerciana Truong (2016); Aspicilia clercii Cl.Roux & M.Bertrand (2020); and Parmotrema clercianum A.A.Spielm. (2020).

== Selected publications ==
- Clerc, Philippe (1984). "Contribution à la révision de la systématique des usnées (Ascomycotina, Usnea) d'Europe I. Usnea orida (L.) Wigg. emend. Clerc". Cryptogamie, Bryologie et Lichénologie (in French). 5: 333–360.
- Clerc, Philippe (2006). "Synopsis of Usnea (lichenized Ascomycetes) from the Azores with additional information on the species in Macaronesia". The Lichenologist. 38 (3): 191–212. doi:10.1017/S002428290600569X.
- Clerc, Philippe (2009). "Species concepts in the genus Usnea (Lichenized Ascomycetes)". The Lichenologist. 30 (4–5): 321–340. doi:10.1006/lich.1998.0150.
- Truong, Camille; Bungartz, Frank; Clerc, Philippe (2011). "The lichen genus Usnea (Parmeliaceae) in the tropical Andes and the Galapagos: species with a red-orange cortical or subcortical pigmentation". The Bryologist. 114 (3): 477–503. doi:10.1639/0007-2745-114.3.477.
- Truong, Camille; Rodriguez, Juan Manuel; Clerc, Philippe (2013). "Pendulous Usnea species (Parmeliaceae, lichenized Ascomycota) in tropical South America and the Galapagos" (PDF). The Lichenologist. 45 (4): 505–543. doi:10.1017/S0024282913000133.

== See also ==
- Category:Taxa named by Philippe Clerc (lichenologist)
