= List of Buellia species =

This is a list of species in the predominantly crustose lichen genus Buellia. They are commonly known as "button lichens" due to the characteristic shape of their apothecia. As of August 2024, Species Fungorum accepts 979 species in the genus Buellia.

== A ==
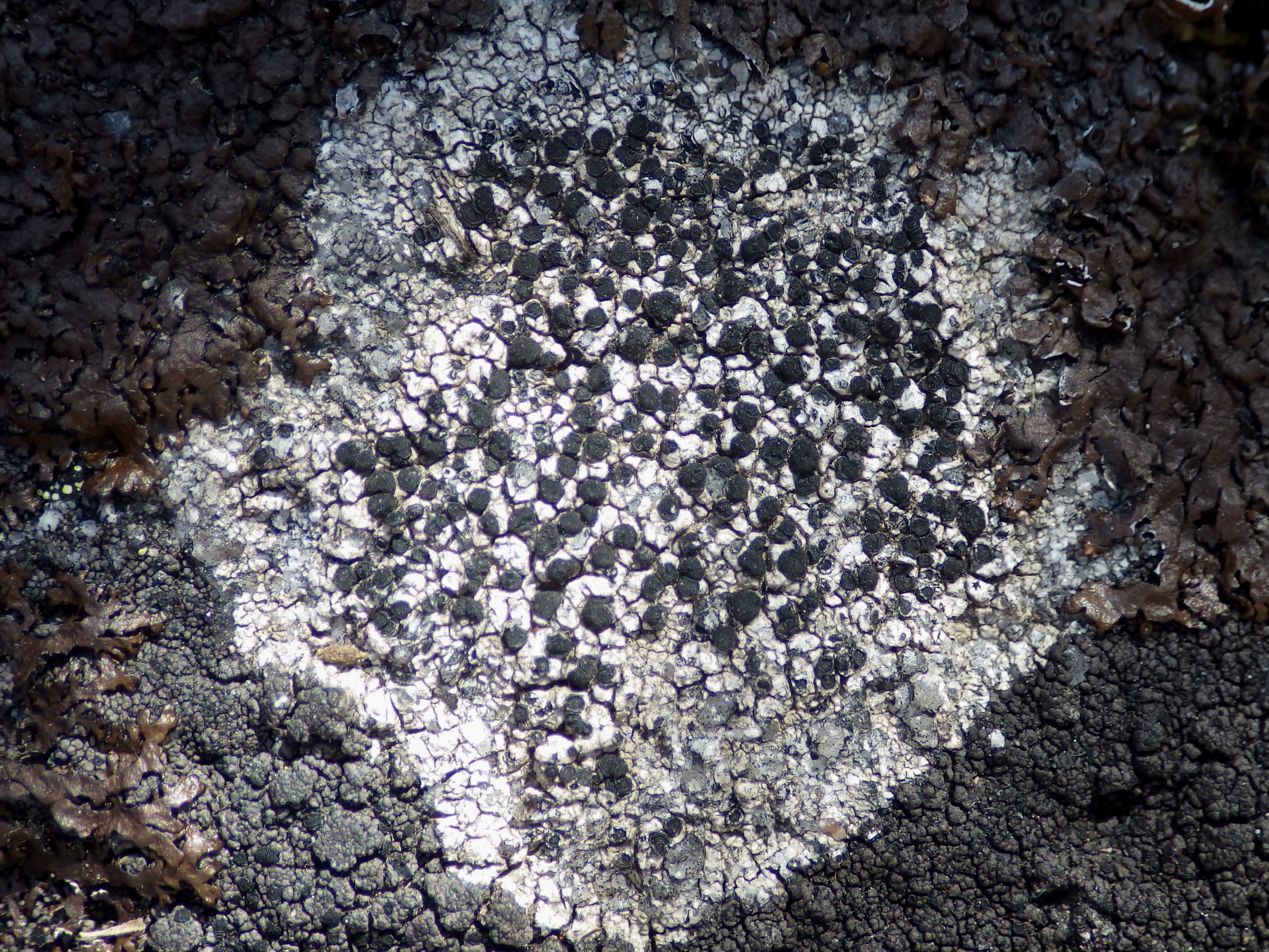
Buellia aethalea

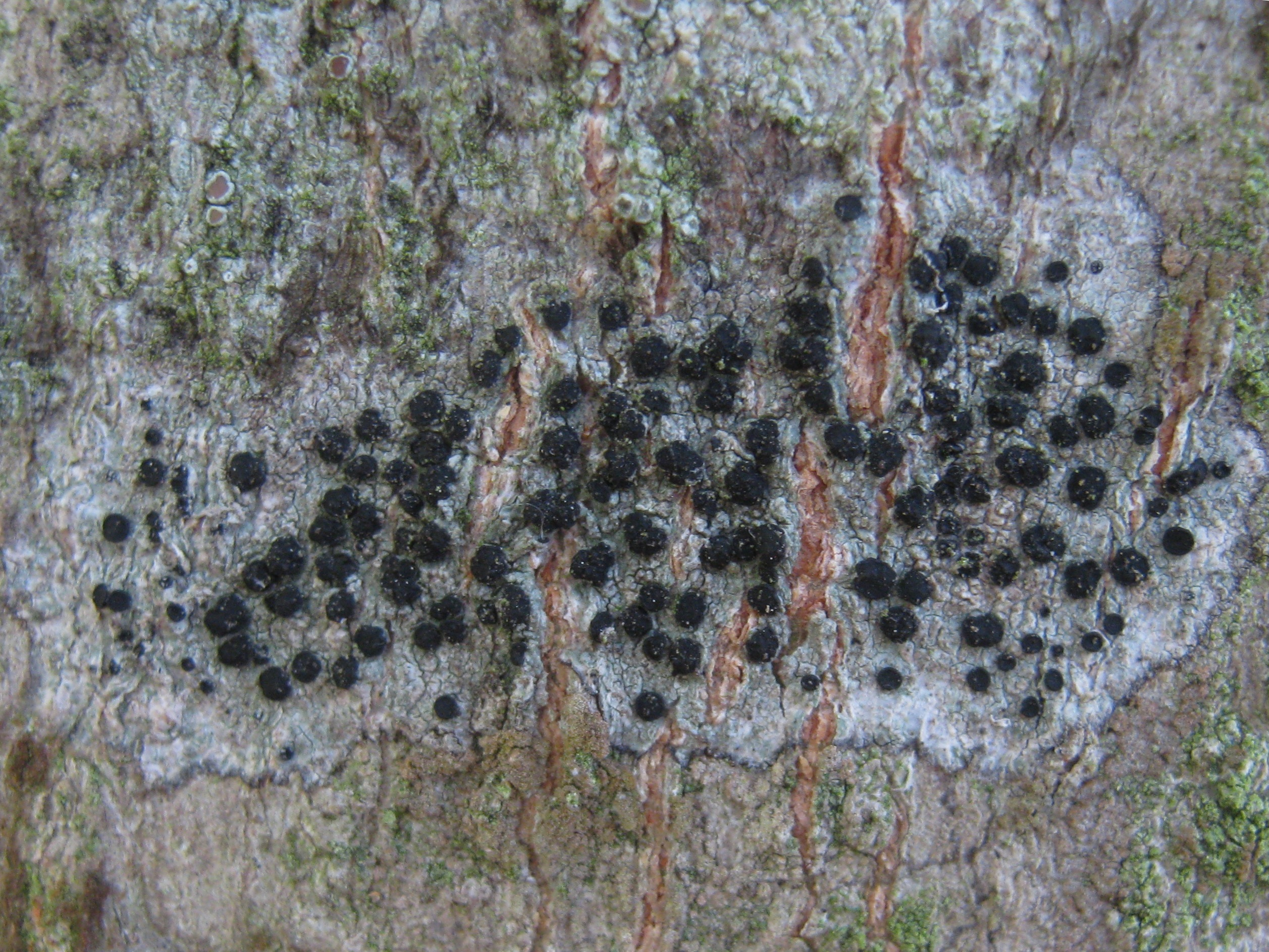
Buellia arborea

- Buellia aberrans Kremp. (1873)
- Buellia acarosporoides Darb. (1923)
- Buellia acervicola Elix & Kantvilas (2020)
- Buellia actinobola Darb. (1923)
- Buellia acunhana (Nyl.) Zahlbr. (1931)
- Buellia adamesii C.W. Dodge (1953)
- Buellia adarensis Darb. (1923)
- Buellia adjuncta Th. Fr. (1866)
- Buellia aequata (Ach.) Szatala (1943)
- Buellia aeruginascens (Nyl.) Zahlbr. (1931)
- Buellia aeruginosa A. Nordin, Owe-Larss. & Elix (1999)
- Buellia aethalea (Ach.) Th. Fr. (1874)
- Buellia aethaleoides (Nyl.) H. Olivier (1903)
- Buellia aethaloessa (Stizenb.) Zahlbr. (1931)
- Buellia afghanica M. Steiner & H. Mayrhofer (1987)
- Buellia afra (Stizenb.) Vain. (1901)
- Buellia africana (Tuck.) Tuck. (1866)
- Buellia agaeleoides Müll. Arg. (1892)
- Buellia agavicola Erichsen (1926)
- Buellia agelaeoides Müll. Arg. (1892)
- Buellia akatorensis Elix & A. Knight (2017) – New Zealand
- Buellia albida C.W. Dodge & G.E. Baker (1938)
- Buellia albidoflava A.L. Sm. (1922)
- Buellia albinea Müll. Arg. (1882)
- Buellia alboatrior (Nyl.) Zahlbr. (1931)
- Buellia albofimbriata C.W. Dodge (1965)
- Buellia alboradians C.W. Dodge & G.E. Baker (1938)
- Buellia albosparsa (Stizenb.) C.W. Dodge (1971)
- Buellia albula (Nyl.) Müll. Arg. (1894)
- Buellia albulella Elix (2017) – Australia
- Buellia alectorialica Elix (2016) – New Zealand
- Buellia aliena Herre (1917)
- Buellia allothallina Müll. Arg. (1862)
- Buellia almeriensis Llimona (1973)
- Buellia almorensis S.R. Singh & D.D. Awasthi (1981)
- Buellia alpina Xin Y. Wang & Li S. Wang (2022)
- Buellia altitudinum B. de Lesd. (1955)
- Buellia alutacea Zahlbr. (1941)
- Buellia amabilis B. de Lesd. (1914)
- Buellia amandineiformis Elix & Kantvilas (2013) – Australia
- Buellia amblyogona Müll. Arg. (1895)
- Buellia ambuta (Stizenb.) Zahlbr. (1931)
- Buellia amphidexia Imshaug ex R.C. Harris (1988)
- Buellia anatolidioides Vain. (1890)
- Buellia anatolodia A. Massal. (1861)
- Buellia anatolodioides Vain. (1890)
- Buellia andina Müll. Arg. (1892)
- Buellia angulosa B. de Lesd. (1906)
- Buellia annulata H. Magn. (1955)
- Buellia anomala Zahlbr. (1914)
- Buellia antarctica A. Massal. (1861)
- Buellia anthracina Anzi (1868)
- Buellia antillarum B. de Lesd. (1943)
- Buellia approximans (Leight.) Zahlbr. (1931)
- Buellia aptrootii Sipman (1992)
- Buellia arborea Coppins & Tønsberg (1992)
- Buellia arctica Lynge (1929)
- Buellia arcularum (Harm.) Lettau (1912)
- Buellia arenaria Müll. Arg. (1893)
- Buellia areolata Zahlbr. (1931)
- Buellia argentinae B. de Lesd. (1940)
- Buellia argillacea Müll. Arg. (1888)
- Buellia argillicola B. de Lesd. (1929)
- Buellia argilliseda Zahlbr. (1931)
- Buellia arida Elix (2020)
- Buellia arnoldii Servít (1932)
- Buellia arsenii B. de Lesd. (1910)
- Buellia arthoniza (Nyl.) Vouaux (1914)
- Buellia asterella Poelt & Sulzer (1974)
- Buellia athallina H. Magn. (1945)
- Buellia atroalba (L.) Th. Fr. (1861)
- Buellia atroalbicans (Nyl. ex Leight.) Jatta (1900)
- Buellia atroalbula (Nyl.) Mong. (1906)
- Buellia atrocinerea (Anzi) Zahlbr. (1931)
- Buellia atrocinerella (Nyl.) Scheid. (1993)
- Buellia atroflavella (Nyl.) Müll. Arg. (1894)
- Buellia atromaculata Sandst. (1912)
- Buellia atropallidula (Nyl.) J. Lahm (1884)
- Buellia aucklandica C.W. Dodge (1971)
- Buellia auriculata Malme (1927)
- Buellia austera Elix & Kantvilas (2016) – Australia
- Buellia australica Räsänen (1944)
- Buellia australissima (Nyl. ex Hue) Zahlbr. (1931)
- Buellia austroabstracta Elix & Kantvilas (2017) – Australia
- Buellia austroalpina Elix & Kantvilas (2013) – Australia
- Buellia austrogeorgica Müll. Arg. (1886)
- Buellia avium Lynge (1928)
- Buellia ayachina Werner (1974)

== B ==
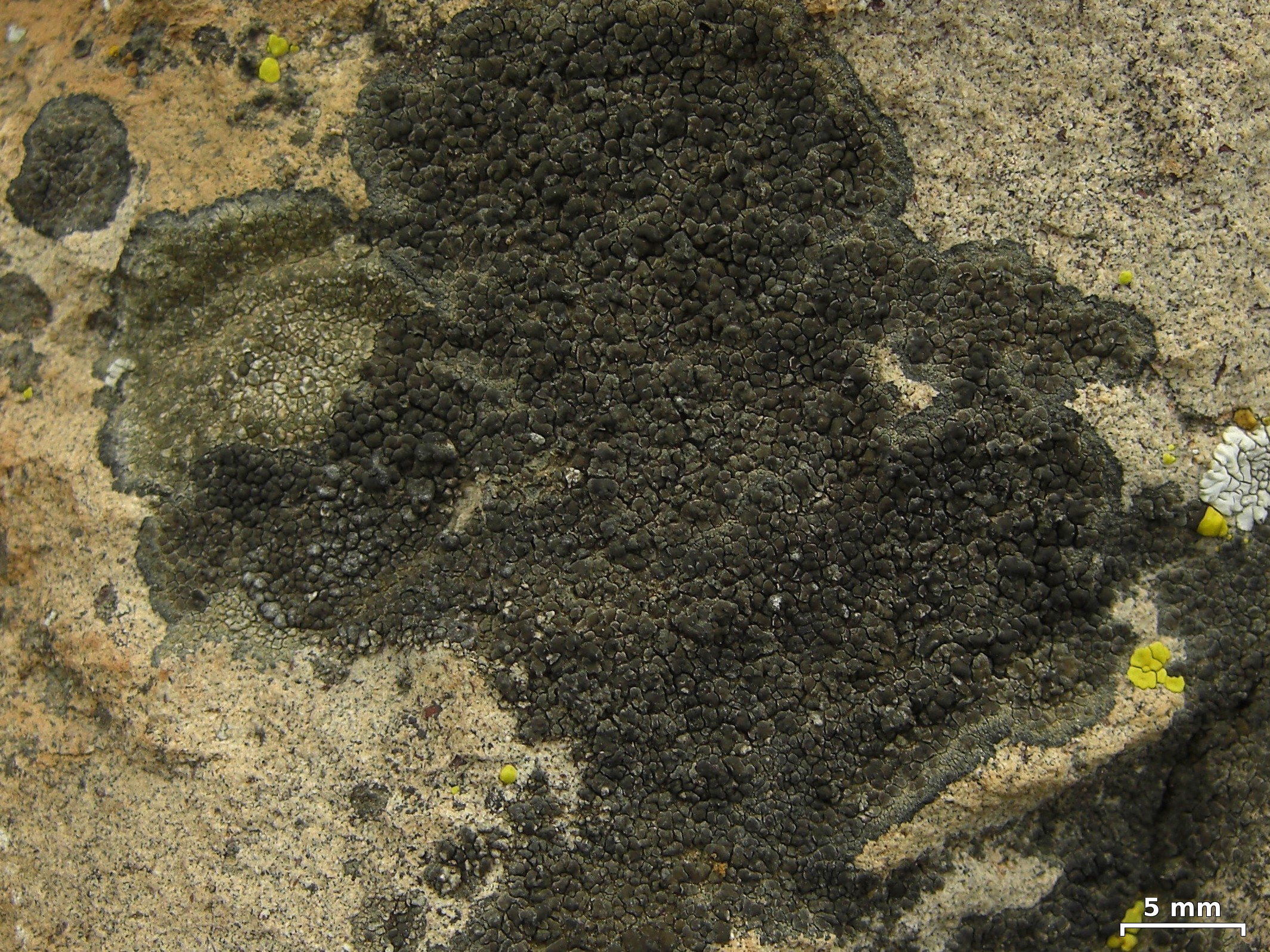
Buellia badia

- Buellia badia (Fr.) A. Massal. (1853)
- Buellia badiella (Nyl.) Arnold (1874)
- Buellia bahiana Malme (1927)
- Buellia bahusiensis Degel. (1939)
- Buellia barrancae (Kremp.) Zahlbr. (1931)
- Buellia barrilensis Zahlbr. (1926)
- Buellia bastinii C.W. Dodge (1962)
- Buellia beerenbergiana Lynge (1939)
- Buellia berggrenii H. Magn. (1955)
- Buellia betulinoides R. Schub. & Klem. (1966)
- Buellia billewersii Elix (2016) – New Zealand
- Buellia bispora (Sheard) Brodo & Sheard (2020)
- Buellia blahaiana Elix & H. Mayrhofer (2021)
- Buellia blastenioides Vain. (1907)
- Buellia blasteniospora Zahlbr. (1935)
- Buellia blumeri Zahlbr. (1909)
- Buellia boergesenii Imshaug (1955)
- Buellia bogongensis Elix (2009) – Australia
- Buellia bohlensis Elix (2015) – Australia
- Buellia boitardii Werner (1940)
- Buellia bolacina Tuck. (1888)
- Buellia bolanderi Tuck. (1872)
- Buellia boseongensis D. Liu, S.Y. Kondr. & Hur (2019)
- Buellia bouvetii Øvstedal (1986)
- Buellia brabantica Vain. (1903)
- Buellia brittoniae Riddle (1923)
- Buellia brunnescens C.W. Dodge & G.E. Baker (1938)
- Buellia brunnthaleri Zahlbr. (1931)
- Buellia bryophila Körb. (1860)
- Buellia buellioides (Metzler ex Arnold) Buschardt (1979)
- Buellia bularmialensis Elix & H.Mayrhofer (2020)

== C ==
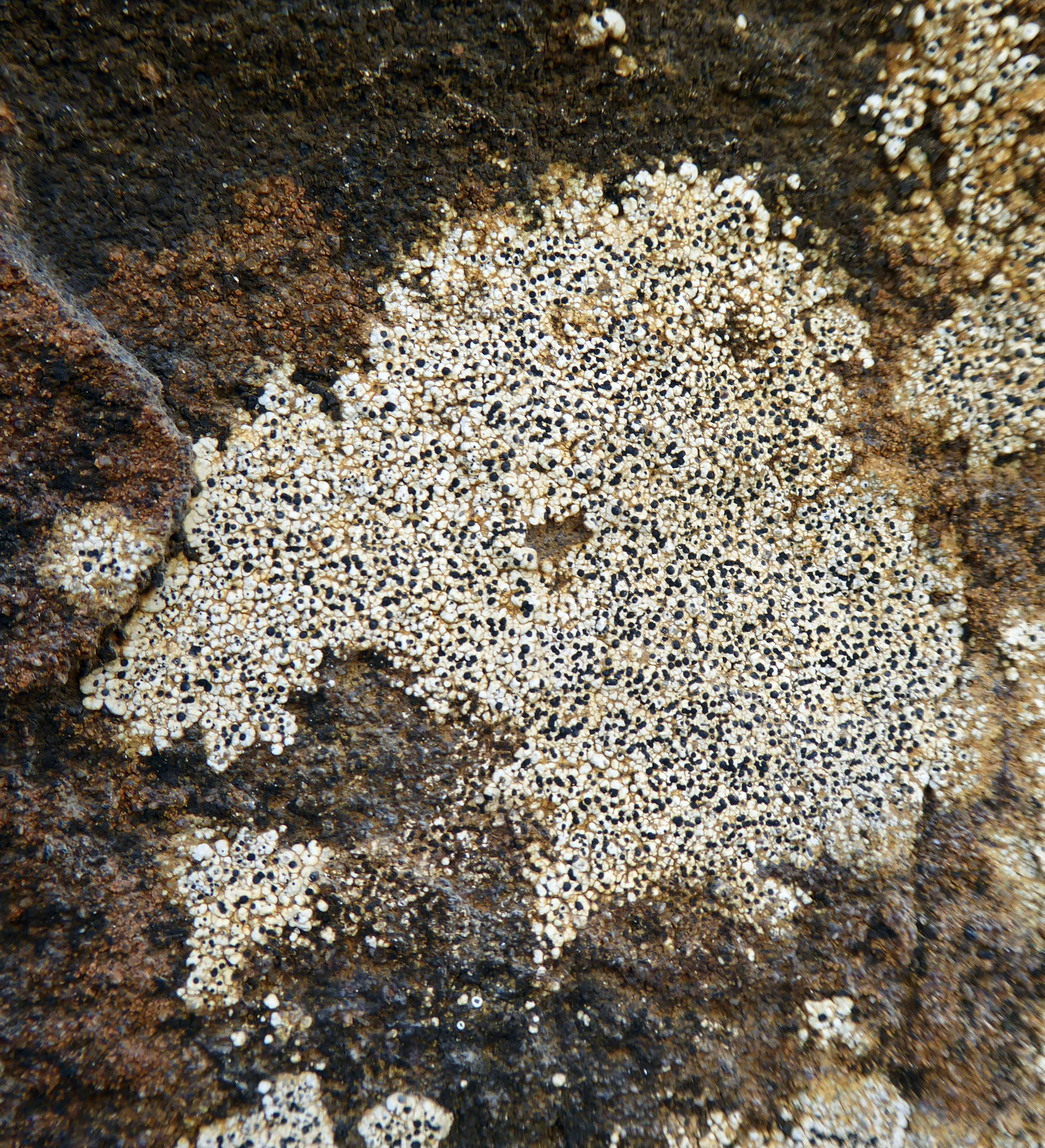
Buellia cranwelliae

- Buellia cacotii B. de Lesd. (1939)
- Buellia cacuminum H. Magn. (1945)
- Buellia caerulescens H. Magn. (1955)
- Buellia caesioatra J. Steiner (1902)
- Buellia caesiocinerescens (Hue) Darb. (1923)
- Buellia calcariaecola B. de Lesd. (1940)
- Buellia calciseda Erichsen (1941)
- Buellia caldesiana Bagl. (1861)
- Buellia callaina (Stizenb.) Zahlbr. (1931)
- Buellia callisporina C.W. Dodge (1971)
- Buellia callisporoides J. Steiner (1919)
- Buellia caloosensis Tuck. (1888)
- Buellia caloplacivora Llimona & Egea (1984)
- Buellia campbelliana Elix (2018)
- Buellia candidula Arnold (1872)
- Buellia cangoensis Vain. (1926)
- Buellia canobolasensis Elix & P.M. McCarthy (2017)
- Buellia capensis Elix & H. Mayrhofer (2021) – South Africa
- Buellia capitata Bagl. (1857)
- Buellia capitis-regum W.A. Weber (1971)
- Buellia capitulata (Th. Fr.) Eckfeldt (1895)
- Buellia carballaliana Paz-Berm. & Giralt (2009)
- Buellia caricae (Bagl.) Lettau (1958)
- Buellia carolinae A. Massal. (1861)
- Buellia casudae Vain. (1918)
- Buellia catalipa A. Massal. (1861)
- Buellia centralis H. Magn. (1940)
- Buellia cerussata Llimona & Werner (1975)
- Buellia cervicolor (Nyl.) Zahlbr. (1931)
- Buellia cervinoplaca Zahlbr. (1930)
- Buellia ceylanensis Zahlbr. (1911)
- Buellia chapadensis Malme (1927)
- Buellia charcotii (Hue) Darb. (1923)
- Buellia chionea (Th. Fr.) Sheard ex Foucard, Moberg & A. Nordin (2002)
- Buellia chloropolia (A. Massal.) Jatta (1889)
- Buellia chlorospora (Nyl.) Hellb. (1871)
- Buellia christophii Bungartz (2004)
- Buellia chrysea C.W. Dodge & G.E. Baker (1938)
- Buellia chudeauiana (Hue) Zahlbr. (1931)
- Buellia chujadoensis Lőkös, S.Y. Kondr. & Hur (2015)
- Buellia chujana Xin Y. Wang, S.Y. Kondr., Lőkös & Hur (2016) – South Korea
- Buellia cinereocaesia B. de Lesd. (1933)
- Buellia cinereoglauca B. de Lesd. (1932)
- Buellia cinereomarginata B. de Lesd. (1922)
- Buellia cinereorufescens B. de Lesd. (1914)
- Buellia cinereoviridula (B. de Lesd.) Zahlbr. (1940)
- Buellia cingulata Zahlbr. (1941)
- Buellia cinnabarina U. Grube (2004) – Australia
- Buellia citrella Darb. (1923)
- Buellia citrina H. Magn. (1943)
- Buellia cocoes Malme (1931)
- Buellia coeruleata Zahlbr. (1931)
- Buellia cohibilis (Nyl.) Zahlbr. (1931)
- Buellia concava Müll. Arg. (1880)
- Buellia concreta Eckfeldt (1895)
- Buellia confervoides Rabenh. (1859)
- Buellia conformis Vain. (1890)
- Buellia confusa D.D. Awasthi (1991)
- Buellia coniopsoidea (Hepp) Eckfeldt (1895)
- Buellia conioptiza (Nyl.) B. de Lesd. 1907)
- Buellia conioptoides (Nyl.) Zahlbr. (1931)
- Buellia conspicua Darb. (1923)
- Buellia conspirans (Nyl.) Vain. (1915)
- Buellia contermina Arnold (1875)
- Buellia contiguella (Vain.) Malme (1902)
- Buellia continens (Nyl.) Zahlbr. (1931)
- Buellia contingens (Nyl.) Zahlbr. (1931)
- Buellia contorta (Müll. Arg.) C.W. Dodge (1971)
- Buellia contrerasii B. de Lesd. (1933)
- Buellia convexa Th. Fr. (1861)
- Buellia coracina Körb. (1855)
- Buellia corallicola H. Magn. (1945)
- Buellia corallizans Zahlbr. (1913)
- Buellia corrugata Körb. (1855)
- Buellia cranfieldii Elix (2010) – Australia
- Buellia cranwelliae Zahlbr. (1941)
- Buellia crassa Riehm. (1932)
- Buellia cravenii Elix (2020)
- Buellia cremea (Hue) Darb. (1923)
- Buellia crepera (Nyl.) Zahlbr. (1931)
- Buellia cretacea Müll. Arg. (1889)
- Buellia crocata Zahlbr. (1931)
- Buellia crozalsiana B. de Lesd. (1924)
- Buellia crystallifera (Vain.) Hav. (1913)
- Buellia cupreola Müll. Arg. (1862)
- Buellia curatellae Malme (1927)
- Buellia curtisii Malme (1927)
- Buellia cycloplaca (I.M. Lamb) Elix (2023)

== D ==
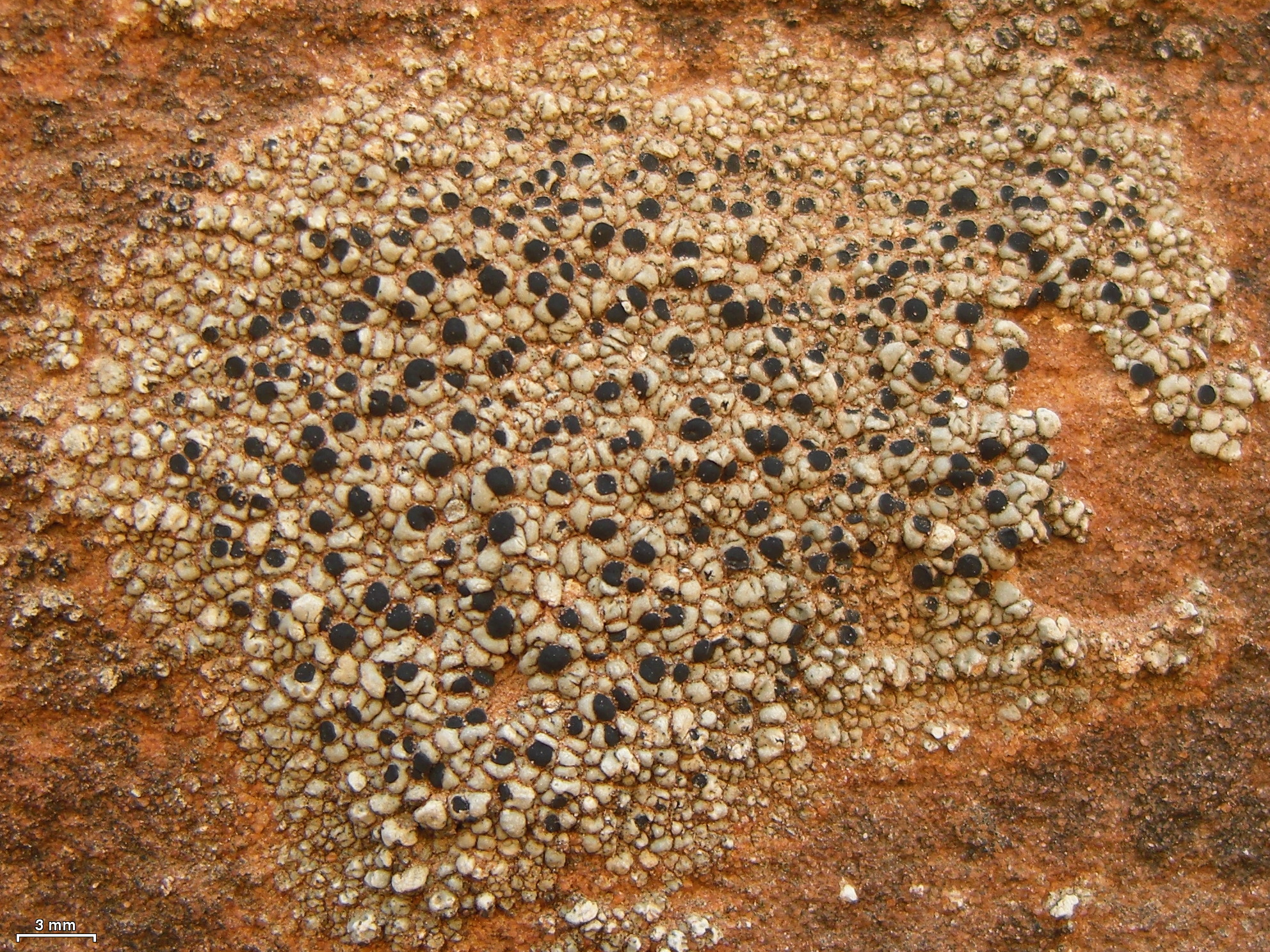
Buellia dispersa

- Buellia dakotensis (H. Magn.) Bungartz (2007)
- Buellia darelia M.S. Iqbal & Khalid (2023)
- Buellia dayboroana Elix & H.Mayrhofer (2020)
- Buellia debanensis (Bagl.) C.W. Dodge (1971)
- Buellia deightonii C.W. Dodge (1953)
- Buellia dejungens (Nyl.) Vain. (1915)
- Buellia delaevata (Nyl.) Zahlbr. (1931)
- Buellia demutans Zahlbr. (1931)
- Buellia dendritica C.W. Dodge & G.E. Baker (1938)
- Buellia densitheca K. Habib & Khalid (2023)
- Buellia deplanata Müll. Arg. (1880)
- Buellia depressa Vain. (1901)
- Buellia desertica (Marbach) Bungartz (2007)
- Buellia desertorum Müll. Arg. (1892)
- Buellia dialyta (Nyl.) Tuck. (1872)
- Buellia dialytella Vain. (1926)
- Buellia dialytoides Vain. (1918)
- Buellia dichromatina (Hue) Darb. (1923)
- Buellia didyma Vain. (1915)
- Buellia dijiana Trinkaus (2001) – Australia
- Buellia dimbulahensis Elix (2015) – Australia
- Buellia dimorphota (Hue) Darb. (1923)
- Buellia diploloma Müll. Arg. (1889)
- Buellia diplotommoides Müll. Arg. (1881)
- Buellia disciformis (Fr.) Mudd 1861)
- Buellia discoensis Lynge (1937)
- Buellia discolorans H. Olivier (1884)
- Buellia disculiformis (Nyl.) Zahlbr. (1931)
- Buellia disjecta Zahlbr. (1930)
- Buellia dispersa A. Massal. (1856)
- Buellia dispersula Müll. Arg. (1894)
- Buellia dissa (Stirt.) Zahlbr. (1931)
- Buellia dissipata Groenh. (1954)
- Buellia distrahens Vain. (1926)
- Buellia distrata (Nyl.) Zahlbr. (1931)
- Buellia dives Th. Fr. (1865)
- Buellia dobrogensis Codor. (1969)
- Buellia dolichotheca P. Crouan & H. Crouan (1903)
- Buellia dovrensis H. Magn. (1957)
- Buellia duartei Samp. (1920)
- Buellia dubia (Vain.) Malme (1932)
- Buellia dubyana (Hepp) Rabenh. (1858)
- Buellia dubyanella Flagey (1896)
- Buellia dubyanoides (Hepp) Müll. Arg. (1862)
- Buellia dunedina Zahlbr. (1941)
- Buellia durackensis Elix & P.M. McCarthy (2017) – Australia
- Buellia durbana Vain. (1926)

== E ==
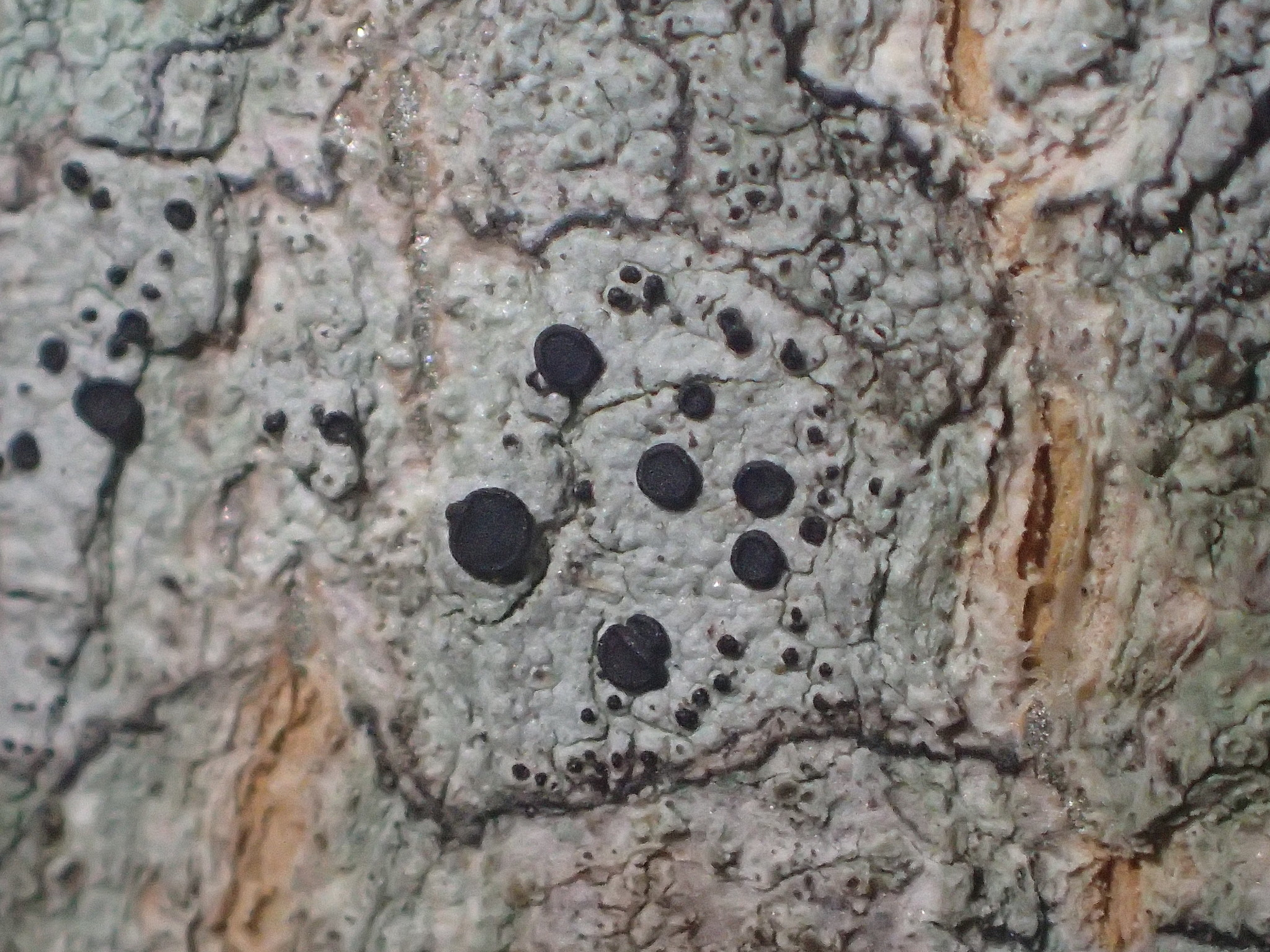
Buellia erubescens

- Buellia ecclesensis Elix (2017) – Australia
- Buellia eckfeldtiana J. Steiner ex H. Magn. (1945)
- Buellia ectolechioides (Vain.) Erichsen (1930)
- Buellia effigurata Anzi (1860)
- Buellia effundens Zahlbr. (1930)
- Buellia eganii Bungartz (2004)
- Buellia eldridgei Elix (2020)
- Buellia elegans Poelt (1974)
- Buellia elenkinii Tomin (1923)
- Buellia endochrysea Vain. (1915)
- Buellia endococcodes Vain. (1915)
- Buellia endoferruginea Bungartz (2007)
- Buellia endoflavida Xin Y. Wang & Li J. Li (2020)
- Buellia endolateritia Zahlbr. (1930)
- Buellia endoleuca Müll. Arg. (1893)
- Buellia endomelaena Darb. (1923)
- Buellia endorhodina Vain. ex Lynge (1937)
- Buellia enteroleucoides (Nyl.) Arnold (1887)
- Buellia epiaeruginosa Elix (2016) – Australia
- Buellia epichlora (Vain.) Zahlbr. (1932)
- Buellia epichlorina Kalb (1986)
- Buellia epiconcolor Bagl. & Carestia (1881)
- Buellia epifimbriata Sipman (2002)
- Buellia epigaella Elix & Kantvilas (2013) – Australia
- Buellia epigea (Pers.) Tuck. (1866)
- Buellia epiphaeoides Vain. (1890)
- Buellia epispila (Nyl.) B. de Lesd. (1905)
- Buellia ericetorum Körb. (1860)
- Buellia erubescens Arnold (1875)
- Buellia ethiopica C.W. Dodge (1971)
- Buellia evanescens Darb. (1923)
- Buellia ewersii Elix (2016) – Australia
- Buellia excellens H. Magn. (1947)
- Buellia excelsa (Leight.) A.L. Sm. (1911)
- Buellia exsoluta (Nyl.) Müll. Arg. (1894)
- Buellia extenuatella Elix & Kantvilas (2013) – Australia
- Buellia extremorientalis (S.Y. Kondr., Lőkös & Hur) S.Y. Kondr., Lőkös & Hur (2016)

== F ==
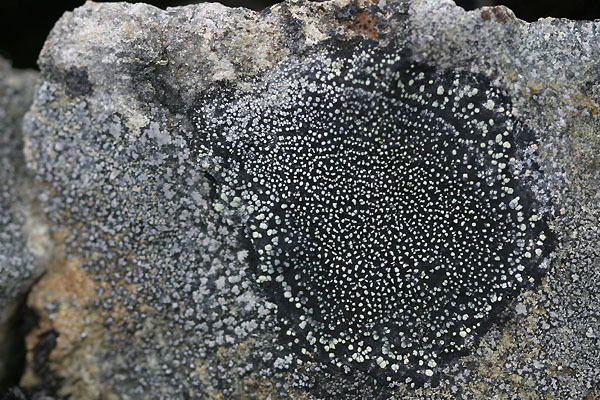
Buellia frigida

- Buellia fagnanoi Sambo (1926)
- Buellia fallax Elix & Kantvilas (2016) – Australia
- Buellia farinosa Malme (1923)
- Buellia farinulenta Müll. Arg. (1893)
- Buellia ferax Müll. Arg. (1892)
- Buellia ferganensis Tomin (1950)
- Buellia fernandeziana Zahlbr. (1917)
- Buellia festivissima (Hue) Darb. (1923)
- Buellia fimbriata (Tuck.) Sheard (1969)
- Buellia finkii G. Merr. (1930)
- Buellia firmiensis B. de Lesd. (1921)
- Buellia flageyana Servít (1937)
- Buellia flavella Müll. Arg. (1893)
- Buellia flavelloides S.R. Singh & D.D. Awasthi (1981)
- Buellia flavescens (J. Steiner) Şenkard. (2010)
- Buellia flavoareolata (Nyl.) Müll. Arg. (1892)
- Buellia flavogranulosa Riddle (1923)
- Buellia flavoplana Darb. (1923)
- Buellia flavovirens Müll. Arg. (1888)
- Buellia floccosa C.W. Dodge & G.E. Baker (1938)
- Buellia fluviicygnorum Elix (2016) – Australia
- Buellia foecunda Filson (1966)
- Buellia follmannii C.W. Dodge (1967)
- Buellia fosteri (Imshaug & Sheard) Perlmutter & Rivas Plata (2018)
- Buellia fraudans (Starbäck) Elix (2009)
- Buellia fraudulenta (Körb. ex Arnold) Rabenh. (1870)
- Buellia frigida Darb. (1910)
- Buellia frisiaca Erichsen (1941)
- Buellia fuliginosa Müll. Arg. (1893)
- Buellia fulvonitescens I.M. Lamb (1968)
- Buellia fusca Arnold (1872)
- Buellia fuscata Metzler (1872)
- Buellia fuscella Müll. Arg. (1888)
- Buellia fuscoatroides B. de Lesd. (1914)
- Buellia fuscoochracea H. Magn. (1955)

== G ==
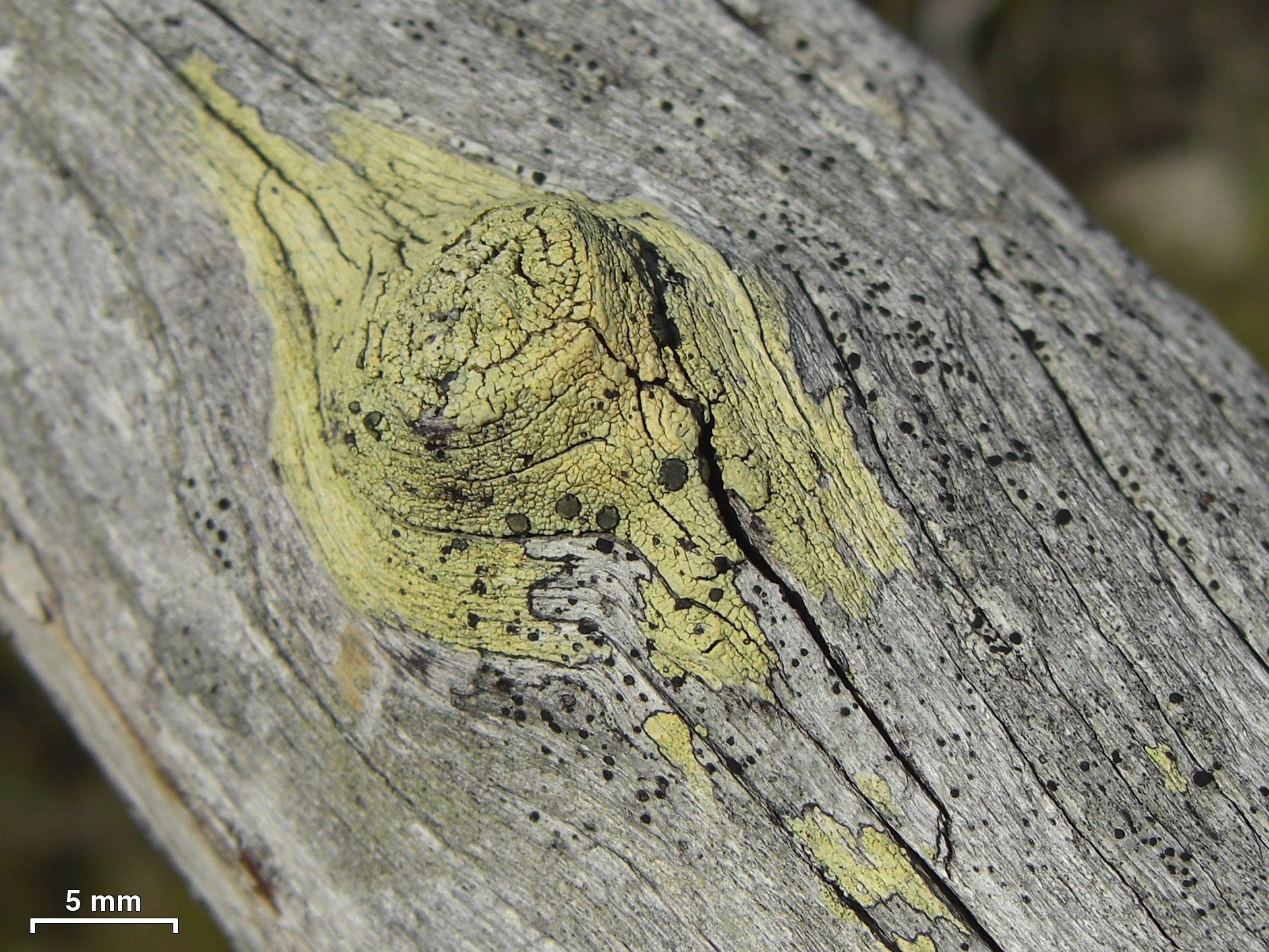
Buellia gerontoides

- Buellia gaahnabulensis Elix (2022)
- Buellia gainii (Hue) Darb. (1923)
- Buellia galapagona W.A. Weber (1971)
- Buellia galbula (DC.) Stizenb. (1862)
- Buellia gattefossei Werner (1955)
- Buellia geminata Mong. (1900)
- Buellia geographica Räsänen (1944)
- Buellia geophila (Flörke ex Sommerf.) Lynge (1937)
- Buellia georgei Trinkaus, H. Mayrhofer & Elix (2001) – Australia
- Buellia gerlachei (Vain.) C.W. Dodge (1973)
- Buellia gerontoides (Stirt.) Imshaug (1955)
- Buellia gibstoneorum Brodo & Sheard (2020)
- Buellia glaucescens Malme (1927)
- Buellia glaucoareolata A.L. Sm. (1922)
- Buellia glaziouana (Kremp.) Müll. Arg. (1880)
- Buellia glencairnensis Zahlbr. (1936)
- Buellia glomelliferae (Harm.) H. Olivier (1906)
- Buellia glomerans (Nyl.) Jatta (1892)
- Buellia glomerata (T.P. Brisson) Zahlbr. (1931)
- Buellia glomerulosa Malme (1927)
- Buellia gordjaginii Oxner (1933)
- Buellia gotlandica J. Steiner (1919)
- Buellia gottelandii Maheu & Werner (1933)
- Buellia goudieri (Hue) Darb. (1923)
- Buellia granularis Müll. Arg. (1888)
- Buellia grisea C.W. Dodge & G.E. Baker (1938)
- Buellia griseonigra (Nyl.) Zahlbr. (1931)
- Buellia griseosquamulata Scheid. (1993)
- Buellia griseovirens (Turner & Borrer ex Sm.) Almb. (1952)
- Buellia groenlandica Vain. (1905)
- Buellia gypsyensis Fryday (2019) – Falkland Islands
- Buellia gyrosa Vain. (1915)

== H ==
- Buellia haemosticta Körb. (1855)
- Buellia halonia (Ach.) Tuck. (1866)
- Buellia halonioides Elix (2017) – Australia
- Buellia halophiloides Zahlbr. (1926)
- Buellia handelii Zahlbr. (1930)
- Buellia harrisiana Elix & H. Mayrhofer (2021)
- Buellia hawaiiensis Tuck. ex H. Magn. (1945)
- Buellia haywardii Elix, A. Knight & H. Mayrhofer (2017) – New Zealand
- Buellia heliophila Llimona (1974)
- Buellia hemispherica S.R. Singh & D.D. Awasthi (1981)
- Buellia henricii B. de Lesd. (1932)
- Buellia herveyensis Elix (2015) – Australia
- Buellia heteropsis Müll. Arg. (1881)
- Buellia heterospora Erichsen (1940)
- Buellia hilaris Zahlbr. (1930)
- Buellia hillmannii Erichsen (1930)
- Buellia himalayensis (S.R. Singh & D.D. Awasthi) A. Nordin (2001)
- Buellia hioramii B. de Lesd. (1940)
- Buellia homocarpa Müll. Arg. (1888)
- Buellia homophylia (C. Knight) Zahlbr. (1931)
- Buellia huei C.W. Dodge (1948)
- Buellia hyperbolica Bagl. (1871)
- Buellia hyperiza (Stirt.) Zahlbr. (1931)
- Buellia hypoleuca H. Magn. (1956)
- Buellia hypoleucella (Nyl.) Zahlbr. (1931)
- Buellia hypoleucodes (Nyl.) Zahlbr. (1931)
- Buellia hypomelaena Müll. Arg. (1889)
- Buellia hypopelidna (Stirt.) Müll. Arg. (1894)
- Buellia hypophana (Nyl.) Zahlbr. (1931)
- Buellia hypopodioides (Nyl.) Arnold (1871)
- Buellia hypopoichila (Vain.) C.W. Dodge (1973)
- Buellia hypopurpurea Elix & A. Knight (2017) – New Zealand
- Buellia hyporosea Elix (2015)
- Buellia hypostictella Elix & H. Mayrhofer (2016)
- Buellia hypothallina Aptroot (1997)
- Buellia hyporosea Elix (2015) – Australia
- Buellia hypostictella Elix & H. Mayrhofer (2016) – New Zealand
- Buellia hypothallina Aptroot (1997)

== I ==
- Buellia iberica Giralt (2000)
- Buellia illaetabilis I.M. Lamb (1968)
- Buellia immersa Lynge (1931)
- Buellia immutans (Nyl.) Zahlbr. (1931)
- Buellia imshaugii Hafellner (1979)
- Buellia inamoena Müll. Arg. (1888)
- Buellia incerta (Nyl.) Zahlbr. (1931)
- Buellia incuriosa (Nyl.) Zahlbr. (1931)
- Buellia indica S.R. Singh & D.D. Awasthi (1981)
- Buellia indissimilis (Nyl.) B. de Lesd. (1914)
- Buellia innata Müll. Arg. (1882)
- Buellia inornata Zahlbr. (1931)
- Buellia insidians (Nyl.) Zahlbr. (1931)
- Buellia insignis Nägeli ex Th. Fr. (1861)
- Buellia insularicola Elix & de Lange (2017) – Kermadec Islands
- Buellia insularis Øvstedal (2009)
- Buellia insulina Müll. Arg. (1888)
- Buellia intercalans (Nyl.) Arnold (1871)
- Buellia inturgescens Müll. Arg. (1892)
- Buellia isabellina Darb. (1923)
- Buellia isabellina Malme (1928)
- Buellia isidiata Herre (1951)
- Buellia isidiophora D.D. Awasthi & Upreti (1981)
- Buellia isidiosulosorediosa Werner (1977)
- Buellia italica A. Massal. (1856)

== J ==
- Buellia jajalpae B. de Lesd. (1933)
- Buellia jamaicensis Imshaug (1955)
- Buellia jaraguensis Zahlbr. (1909)
- Buellia jattana Müll. Arg. (1889)
- Buellia joannae (Hue) Darb. (1923)
- Buellia johnstonii C.W. Dodge (1948)
- Buellia jojutlae B. de Lesd. (1937)
- Buellia jorgei Samp. (1924)
- Buellia jorgensis Zahlbr. (1925)
- Buellia jugorum (Arnold) Arnold (1884)

== K ==
- Buellia kantvilasii Elix, Blanchon & A. Knight (2017) – New Zealand
- Buellia kaproorea Elix (2015) – Australia
- Buellia kashmirensis Afshan, Fayyaz & Khalid (2023)
- Buellia kauaiensis H. Magn. (1955)
- Buellia kenyensis C.W. Dodge (1971)
- Buellia kerguelenica Elix (2019)
- Buellia kerguelensis C.W. Dodge (1966) – Kerguelen Islands
- Buellia keteleeriae Zahlbr. (1930)
- Buellia kimberleyana Elix (2009) – Australia
- Buellia kirghisorum Oxner (1939)
- Buellia kitensis (Stirt.) Zahlbr. (1931)
- Buellia kowenensis Elix & P.M. McCarthy (2020)
- Buellia krempelhuberi Zahlbr. (1931)

== L ==
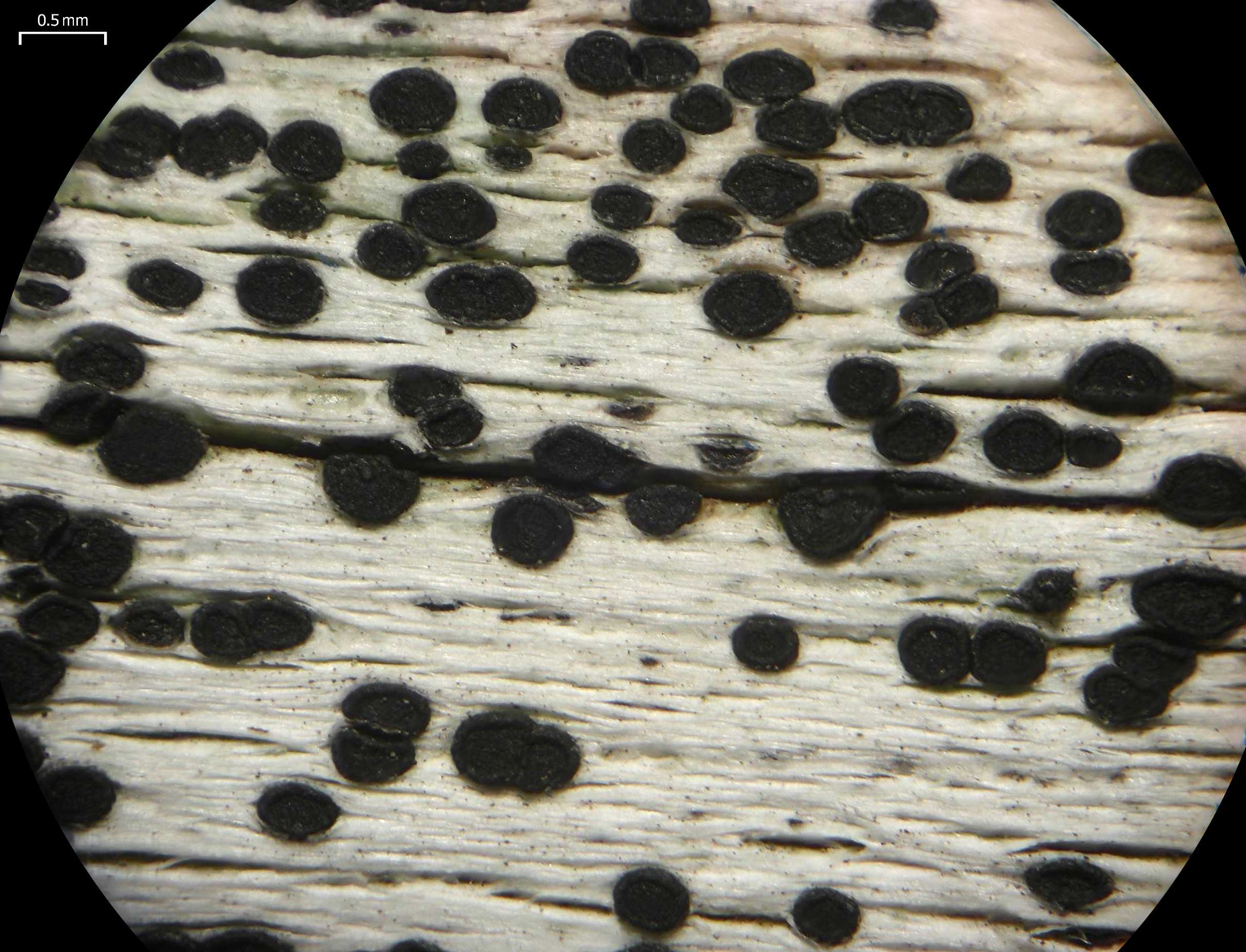
Buellia leucomela

- Buellia lactea (Schaer.) Körb. (1860)
- Buellia lacteoidea B. de Lesd. (1932)
- Buellia lainea (Ach.) Clauzade (1969)
- Buellia lakensis Egan (1971)
- Buellia lambii C.W. Dodge (1973)
- Buellia langbaanensis Vain. (1926)
- Buellia laurocanariensis Giralt, Etayo & van den Boom (2002)
- Buellia lavicola (Zahlbr.) H. Magn. (1952)
- Buellia lecanactina (J. Steiner) C.W. Dodge (1971)
- Buellia lecanoricola Renob. (1996)
- Buellia lecanoroides H. Magn. (1952)
- Buellia lechleri J. Steiner (1919)
- Buellia lecidina (Körb.) Stein (1879)
- Buellia lepidastra (Tuck.) Tuck. (1888)
- Buellia lepidastroidea Imshaug ex Bungartz (2004)
- Buellia lepidophila (Anzi) Jatta (1900)
- Buellia leproplaca Zahlbr. (1930)
- Buellia leptina J. Steiner (1911)
- Buellia leptocline (Flot.) A. Massal. (1854)
- Buellia leptoclinella (Nyl.) Zahlbr. (1931)
- Buellia leptoclinoides (Nyl.) J. Steiner (1907)
- Buellia leptolepis Bagl. & Carestia (1864)
- Buellia lesdainii Zahlbr. (1931)
- Buellia leucina Müll. Arg. (1888)
- Buellia leucomela Imshaug (1955) – Jamaica; United States
- Buellia leukeimum Kremp. (1861)
- Buellia levieri Jatta (1911)
- Buellia lichexanthonica Aptroot & M. Cáceres (2017)
- Buellia lignoides Filson (1966)
- Buellia liguriensis B. de Lesd. (1954)
- Buellia liovillei (Hue) Darb. (1923)
- Buellia lisbonensis Werner (1976)
- Buellia litoralis Zahlbr. (1941)
- Buellia lividescens (Bagl. & Carestia) Arnold (1884)
- Buellia llanoi C.W. Dodge (1968)
- Buellia lobata Trinkaus & Elix (2001) – Australia
- Buellia longispora Scheid. (1993)
- Buellia lordhowensis Elix (2020)
- Buellia lucens Vain. (1890)
- Buellia luridula (Nyl.) Zahlbr. (1931)
- Buellia lusitanica J. Steiner (1907)
- Buellia lutata (Stizenb.) Zahlbr. (1931)
- Buellia lutea C.W. Dodge (1973)
- Buellia lutosa (A. Massal.) Anzi (1862)
- Buellia lycopodina (Mont.) Zahlbr. (1931)
- Buellia lygaeodes Körb. (1867)
- Buellia lyperiza (Stirt.) A.L. Sm. (1911)

== M ==
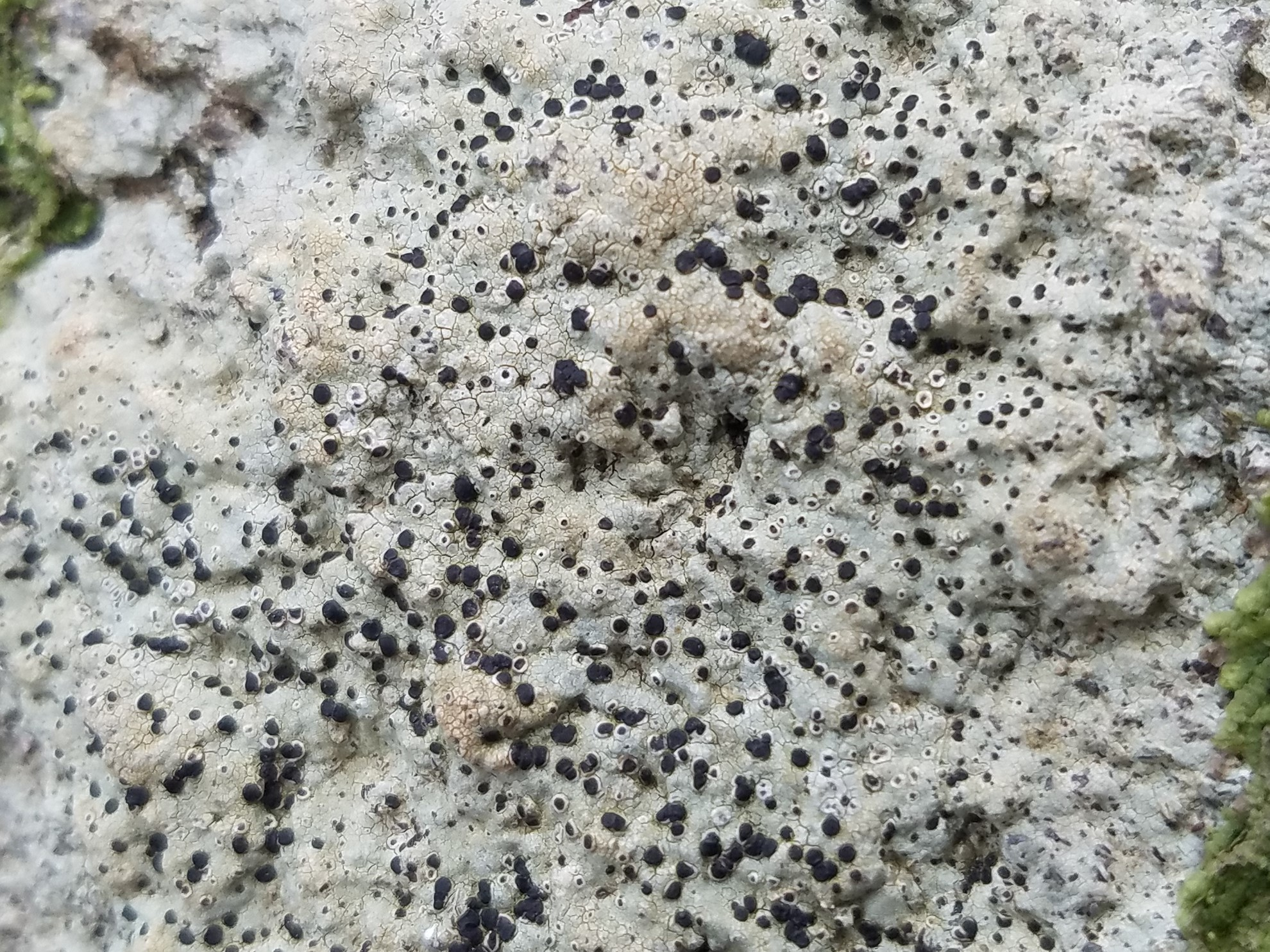
Buellia mamillana

- Buellia mackeei Elix & H. Mayrhofer (2019) – New Caledonia
- Buellia macularis Zahlbr. (1941)
- Buellia macveanii Elix (2016) – Australia
- Buellia maficola Elix (2016) – Australia
- Buellia magaliesbergensis Elix & H. Mayrhofer (2021) – South Africa
- Buellia magapotamica Malme (1919)
- Buellia major De Not. (1846)
- Buellia malcolmii Elix (2016) – New Zealand
- Buellia maldonensis H. Magn. (1950)
- Buellia malmei Lynge (1926)
- Buellia mamillana (Tuck.) W.A. Weber (1986)
- Buellia manamiana Diederich (1997)
- Buellia manipurensis Kr.P. Singh & S.R. Singh (1982)
- Buellia marcidula (Nyl.) C.W. Dodge (1971)
- Buellia margaritacea (Fr.) Lynge (1928)
- Buellia margaritae (Hue) Darb. (1923)
- Buellia marginulata (Müll. Arg.) Zahlbr. (1931)
- Buellia maritima (A. Massal.) Bagl. (1856)
- Buellia masafuerana Zahlbr. (1926)
- Buellia mattogrossensis Malme (1927)
- Buellia maunakeaensis Zahlbr. (1912)
- Buellia maungatuensis Elix & H. Mayrhofer (2017) – New Zealand
- Buellia maura Werner (1974)
- Buellia mawsonii C.W. Dodge (1948)
- Buellia mayrhoferae Elix (2016) – Australia
- Buellia mcleanii C.W. Dodge (1948)
- Buellia mediterranea Giralt (2000)
- Buellia megaspora (S.R. Singh & D.D. Awasthi) A. Nordin (2000)
- Buellia meghalayensis S.R. Singh & D.D. Awasthi (1981)
- Buellia meizocarpa Vain. (1926)
- Buellia melampoa (Hue) Darb. (1923)
- Buellia melanostola (Hue) Darb. (1923)
- Buellia melanotrichia Darb. (1912)
- Buellia melanthina (Stizenb.) Zahlbr. (1931)
- Buellia melaxanthiza (Nyl.) Zahlbr. (1931)
- Buellia mesospora Elix & Kantvilas (2014) – Australia
- Buellia mexicana J. Steiner (1911)
- Buellia mexicana B. de Lesd. (1914)
- Buellia micraspis (Nyl.) Anzi (1860)
- Buellia microareolata Xin Y. Wang & Li S. Wang (2020)
- Buellia microbola (Tuck. ex Fink) Sheard 1969)
- Buellia microcarpa Vondrák & Malíček (2022)
- Buellia microphylla Malme (1927)
- Buellia microplaca (Vain.) Erichsen (1930)
- Buellia microscopica Vain. (1890)
- Buellia microsperma Müll. Arg. (1886)
- Buellia microspora H. Magn. (1955)
- Buellia microsporella Elix (2009)
- Buellia microtera (Nyl.) Zahlbr. (1931)
- Buellia minima Malme (1927)
- Buellia minispora Elix (2019) – Antarctica
- Buellia minutissima Lynge (1928)
- Buellia minutula (Körb.) Arnold (1870)
- Buellia miriquidica Scheid. (1987)
- Buellia mixcoacensis B. de Lesd. (1929)
- Buellia mniaroeoides (Nyl.) Arnold (1871)
- Buellia modica (Nyl.) Arnold (1879)
- Buellia modicula (Nyl.) Dalla Torre & Sarnth. (1902)
- Buellia mogensenii E.S. Hansen & Tønsberg (2012) – Greenland
- Buellia molonglo U. Grube & Elix (2004) – Australia
- Buellia mongolica H. Magn. (1940)
- Buellia montevidensis Malme (1927)
- Buellia morehensis Kr.P. Singh & S.R. Singh (1982)
- Buellia moreliensis B. de Lesd. (1914)
- Buellia moriopsoides (Vain.) Zahlbr. 1931)
- Buellia morsina A. Nordin (2000)
- Buellia mougeotii (Hepp) Lojka (1869)
- Buellia mourayamana (Nyl.) Zahlbr. (1931)
- Buellia mozambica (Vain.) C.W. Dodge (1971)
- Buellia muelleri Zahlbr. (1931)
- Buellia mughorum Anzi (1864)
- Buellia multispora Kalb & Vězda (1979)
- Buellia muratii Werner (1954)
- Buellia muriformis A. Nordin & Tønsberg (1999)
- Buellia murina (Stizenb.) C.W. Dodge (1971)
- Buellia murorum (A. Massal.) Liška, Palice & Slavíková (2008)
- Buellia muscicola C.W. Dodge & G.E. Baker (1938)
- Buellia mutabilis Lynge (1940)
- Buellia mutata Malme (1927)
- Buellia mycetoides Anzi (1868)
- Buellia myriocarpella (Nyl.) H. Olivier (1903)

== N ==
- Buellia namaquaensis Elix, H. Mayrhofer & Wetschnig (2021) – South Africa
- Buellia nantiana B. de Lesd. (1909)
- Buellia naranjitana Zahlbr. (1930)
- Buellia nashii Bungartz (2004)
- Buellia navajoensis Bungartz (2004)
- Buellia neckerensis H. Magn. (1942)
- Buellia neglecta Eitner (1901)
- Buellia neohalonia Elix & H. Mayrhofer (2020)
- Buellia nesiotis (Stizenb.) Zahlbr. (1931)
- Buellia nigra (Fink) Sheard (1969)
- Buellia nigricans C.W. Dodge (1968)
- Buellia nigritula (Nyl.) Mudd (1861)
- Buellia nigromaculata Räsänen (1943)
- Buellia nihoae H. Magn. (1942)
- Buellia nilgiriensis S.R. Singh & D.D. Awasthi (1981)
- Buellia nitida Eitner (1901)
- Buellia nivea Räsänen (1944)
- Buellia nodulosa (Lynge) H. Magn. (1952)
- Buellia nordinii Giralt, Kalb & Elix (2010) – Venezuela
- Buellia northallina Elix & Kantvilas (2017) – Australia
- Buellia novae-caledoniae B. de Lesd. (1937)
- Buellia novomexicana B. de Lesd. (1932)
- Buellia nubila (Norman) Zahlbr. (1931)
- Buellia nubiloides Zahlbr. (1931)
- Buellia numerosa Watanuki & H. Harada (2017) – Japan
- Buellia nylanderiana Zahlbr. (1931)

== O ==
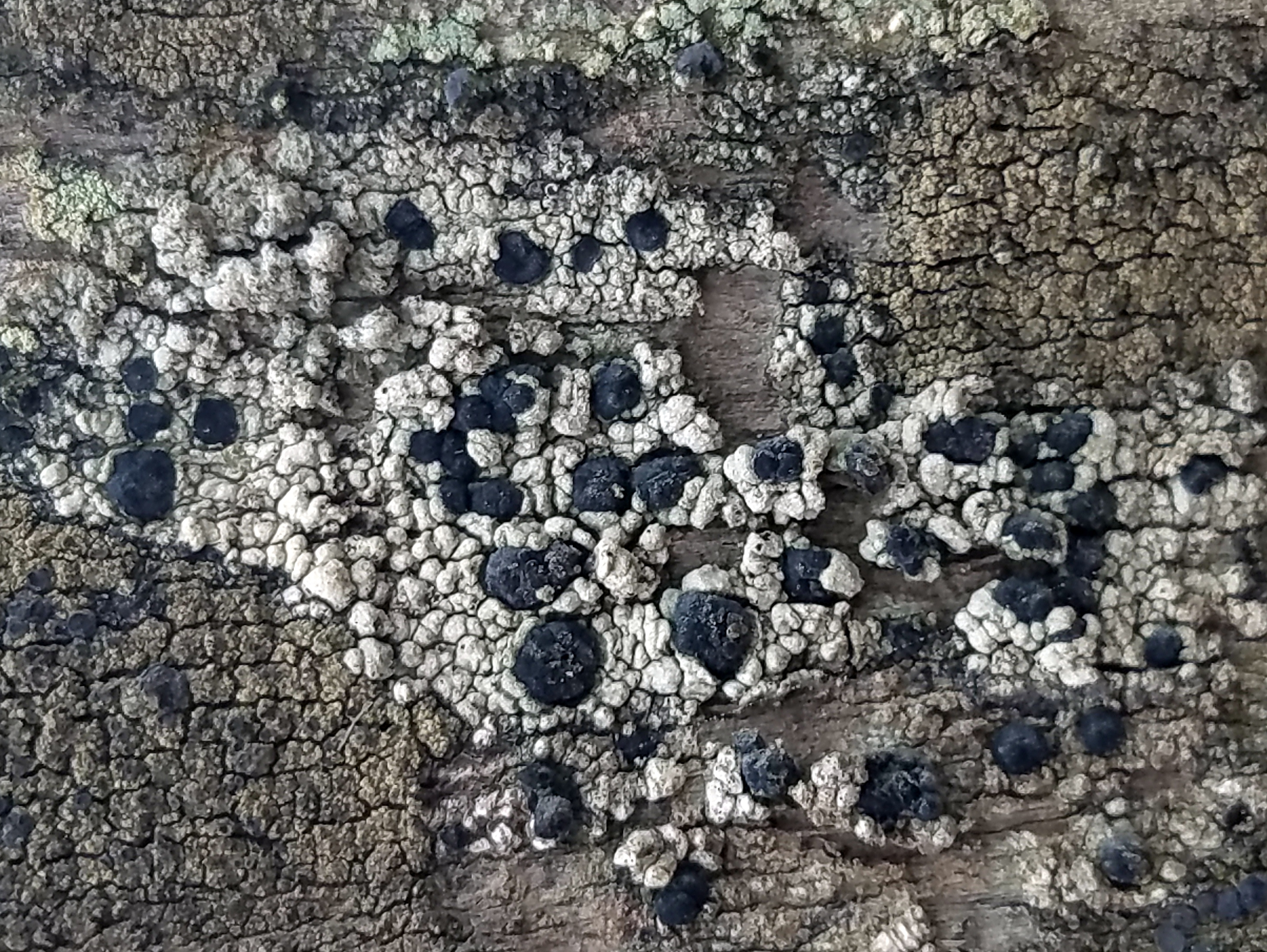
Buellia oidalea

- Buellia oahuensis H. Magn. (1945)
- Buellia oblongata (Müll. Arg.) C.W. Dodge (1971)
- Buellia obtecta Nilson (1907)
- Buellia occidentalis Lynge (1937)
- Buellia ocellata (Flot.) Körb. (1855)
- Buellia ocoteae Vain. (1926)
- Buellia oederi (Hoffm.) Rostr. (1871)
- Buellia oidalea (Tuck.) Tuck. (1866)
- Buellia oidaliella A. Nordin (1999)
- Buellia olivacea Müll. Arg. (1893)
- Buellia olivaceobrunnea C.W. Dodge & G.E. Baker (1938)
- Buellia olivaceofusca (Anzi) Zahlbr. (1931)
- Buellia olivicolor (Hue) Zahlbr. (1931)
- Buellia olympica Müll. Arg. (1879)
- Buellia orcularia Vain. (1915)
- Buellia oxydata H. Magn. (1955)

== P ==
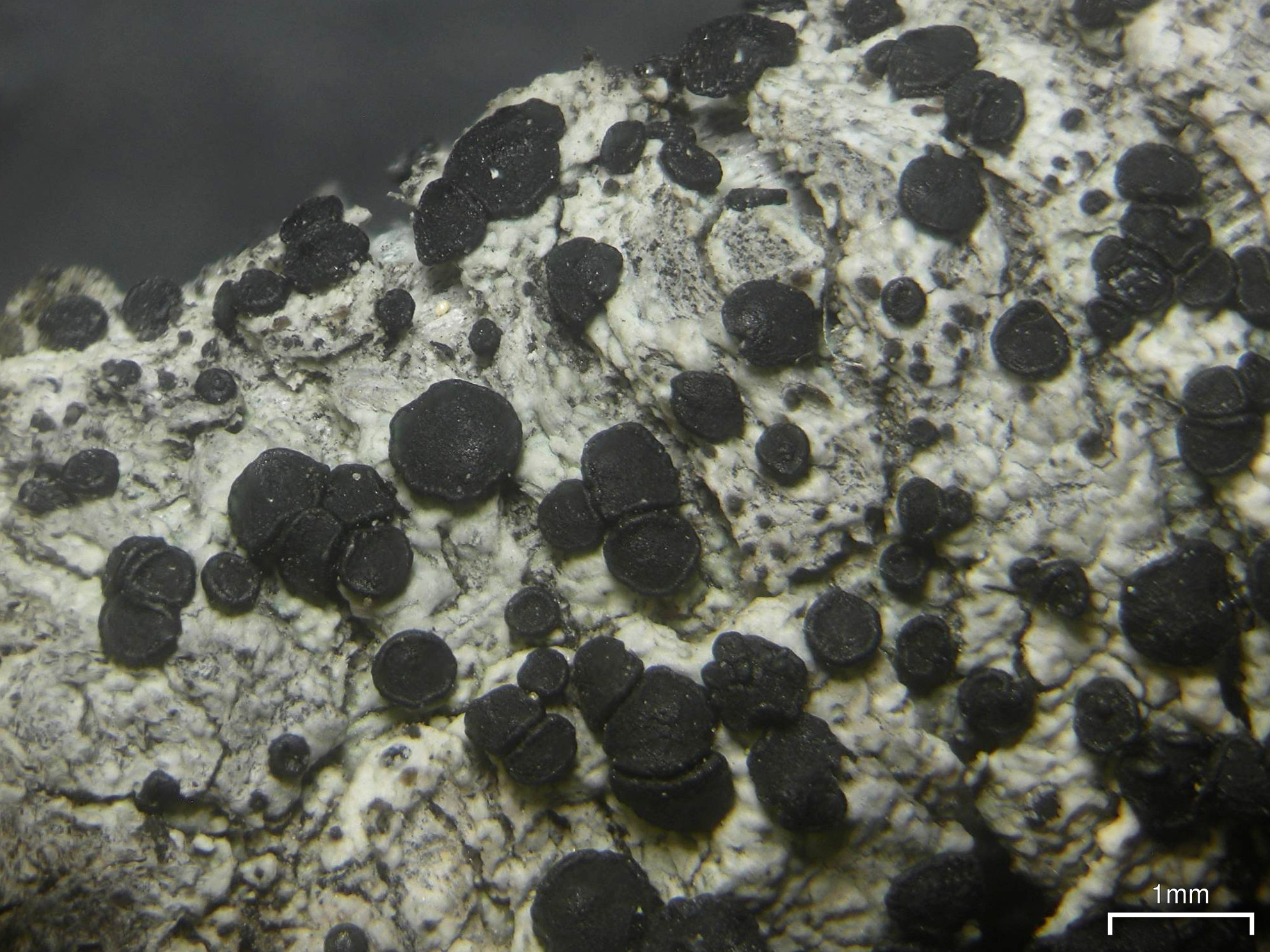
Buellia penichra

- Buellia pachnodes (Stizenb.) Zahlbr. (1931)
- Buellia pachydermatica Vain. (1915)
- Buellia pachyospora A. Massal. (1861)
- Buellia pachyphragma Vain. (1915)
- Buellia pachysporoides Vain. ex Lynge (1937)
- Buellia pachytheca H. Magn. (1945)
- Buellia pacifica H. Magn. (1942)
- Buellia pallida C.W. Dodge & G.E. Baker (1938)
- Buellia pallidomarginata A. Nordin (2001)
- Buellia pallidula H. Magn. (1955)
- Buellia palmensis (Vain.) C.W. Dodge (1971)
- Buellia palniensis S.R. Singh & D.D. Awasthi (1981)
- Buellia pandani H. Magn. (1955)
- Buellia paniformis W.A. Weber (1971)
- Buellia pannarina Elix (2016) – Australia
- Buellia papanui Elix & H. Mayrhofer (2017) – New Zealand
- Buellia papillosa Müll. Arg. (1888)
- Buellia paradisana Elix & Kantvilas (2020)
- Buellia parasema De Not. (1846)
- Buellia parasemopsis (Nyl.) Zahlbr. (1931)
- Buellia parastata (Nyl.) Zahlbr. (1931)
- Buellia parmigera M. Ai & Xin Y. Wang (2023)
- Buellia particularis (Nyl.) A.L. Sm. (1911)
- Buellia parvula (H. Mayrhofer & Poelt) H. Mayrhofer & Scheid. (1993)
- Buellia paschalis Zahlbr. (1926)
- Buellia patearoana Elix & A. Knight (2017) – New Zealand
- Buellia patouillardii (Hue) Zahlbr. (1931)
- Buellia paulensis Zahlbr. (1909)
- Buellia paulorum Cretz. (1941)
- Buellia paupera H. Magn. (1942)
- Buellia paupercula Jatta (1910)
- Buellia payeri Körb. (1874)
- Buellia peculiaris H. Magn. (1948)
- Buellia penichra (Tuck.) Hasse (1913)
- Buellia peregrina Bungartz & V. Wirth (2007) – Africa
- Buellia perexigua Müll. Arg. (1893)
- Buellia perigrapta (Stizenb.) Zahlbr. (1931)
- Buellia perlata Darb. (1923)
- Buellia perminuta Zahlbr. (1956)
- Buellia permixta (Nyl.) Flagey (1896)
- Buellia permodica (Stizenb.) Zahlbr. (1931)
- Buellia pernigra Darb. (1923)
- Buellia pernigrans (Nyl.) Sandst. (1912)
- Buellia perpunctulata B. de Lesd. (1909)
- Buellia perspersa J. Steiner (1926)
- Buellia petermannii (Hue) Darb. (1923)
- Buellia philippina Räsänen (1949)
- Buellia phillipensis Elix (2020)
- Buellia phloeoica (Nyl.) Zahlbr. (1931)
- Buellia pigmentosa Elix & Kantvilas (2014) – Australia
- Buellia pinastri Erichsen (1940)
- Buellia pinguicula (Bagl. & Carestia) Jatta (1892)
- Buellia pinicola S.R. Singh & D.D. Awasthi (1981)
- Buellia pinnicola C.W. Dodge (1948)
- Buellia pirionii B. de Lesd. (1934)
- Buellia pitardii B. de Lesd. 1937)
- Buellia pithecellobii Vain. (1913)
- Buellia placodiomorphoides Imshaug (1955)
- Buellia placodiospora Vain. (1921)
- Buellia placophylla (Anzi) Jatta (1900)
- Buellia pleiophoroides (Nyl.) Vain. (1909)
- Buellia pleiotera Malme (1927)
- Buellia podocarpa C.W. Dodge (1948)
- Buellia poimenae Elix & Kantvilas (2013) – Australia
- Buellia poliocheila Vain. (1915)
- Buellia polita Zahlbr. (1930)
- Buellia polycarpa Bagl. & Carestia (1865)
- Buellia polychroa (Hue) Darb. (1923)
- Buellia polyporina (Nyl.) Zahlbr. (1931)
- Buellia polyspora (Willey) Vain. (1890)
- Buellia polysporella (Nyl.) Arnold (1871)
- Buellia poolesensis Elix (2017) – Australia
- Buellia populorum (A. Massal.) Clauzade & Cl. Roux (1985)
- Buellia porphyrilica Elix & H. Mayrhofer (2018) – New Zealand
- Buellia portoricensis H. Magn. (1955)
- Buellia postglacialis Hafellner (1982)
- Buellia posthabita (Nyl.) Zahlbr. (1931)
- Buellia praefinita (Nyl.) C.W. Dodge (1971)
- Buellia praelata (Stizenb.) Zahlbr. (1931)
- Buellia premnea (Körb.) J. Kickx f. (1867)
- Buellia procellarum A. Massal. (1861)
- Buellia proserpens Müll. Arg. (1893)
- Buellia prothallina Elix (2017)
- Buellia protothallina (Kremp.) Vain. (1903)
- Buellia proximata H. Magn. (1945)
- Buellia pruinocalcarea Aptroot, M.F. Souza & Spielmann (2023)
- Buellia pruinosa Müll. Arg. (1893)
- Buellia pseudomicromera (Marbach) Bungartz (2007)
- Buellia pseudopetraea (Nyl.) Boistel (1903)
- Buellia pseudosaxatilis Samp. 1917)
- Buellia pseudosubnexa (S.Y. Kondr., Lőkös & Hur) S.Y. Kondr., Lőkös & Hur (2016)
- Buellia pseudotetrapla (Pusswald) Elix (2009)
- Buellia psoromica Elix (2009) – Australia
- Buellia pueblae B. de Lesd. (1933)
- Buellia pullata Tuck. (1866)
- Buellia pulverea Coppins & P. James (1978)
- Buellia punctatula Malme (1927)
- Buellia punctiformis (DC.) A. Massal. (1852)
- Buellia pura Vain. (1926)
- Buellia purdieae Elix (2022)
- Buellia pusillula (Nyl.) Zahlbr. (1931)
- Buellia pycnogonoides Darb. (1923)
- Buellia pygmaea (Räsänen) Elix, H. Mayrhofer & J.M. Rodr. (2018)
- Buellia pyrenopsoides (Vain.) Zahlbr. (1931)
- Buellia pyxinoides (Vain.) Imshaug (1955)

== Q ==
- Buellia quarryana Elix & P.M.McCarthy (2020) – Australia
- Buellia quartziana S.R. Singh & D.D. Awasthi (1981)
- Buellia quaterna Zahlbr. (1936)
- Buellia quercina Darb. (1910)

== R ==
- Buellia racovitzae C.W. Dodge (1973)
- Buellia radians (Harm.) Lettau (1912)
- Buellia rarotongensis Elix (2016)
- Buellia reagenella Elix (2009)
- Buellia reagens H. Magn. (1947)
- Buellia recepta (Kremp.) Müll. Arg. (1880)
- Buellia rechingeri Zahlbr. (1907)
- Buellia recobarina (A. Massal.) Müll. Arg. (1879)
- Buellia regineae Bungartz (2004)
- Buellia regularis Kalb (1992)
- Buellia remensa (Stirt.) Imshaug (1955)
- Buellia retrovertens Tuck. (1888)
- Buellia rhedonensis (Nyl.) H. Olivier (1901)
- Buellia rhizocarpella Elix (2015) – Australia
- Buellia rhizocarpica Etayo, Giralt & Elix (2010) – Mexico
- Buellia rhodesiaca Zahlbr. (1932)
- Buellia rhodina (Vain.) C.W. Dodge (1971)
- Buellia rhombispora Marbach (2000)
- Buellia ricasolii (A. Massal.) A. Massal. (1855)
- Buellia rimulosa Müll. Arg. (1888)
- Buellia rinodinea A. Massal. (1861)
- Buellia rinodinoides Anzi 1866)
- Buellia rinodinospora Riddle (1917)
- Buellia rittokensis Hellb. (1867)
- Buellia rivularis (Flot. ex Körb.) Kremp. (1861)
- Buellia rodseppeltii Elix (2019) – Antarctica
- Buellia romoletia A. Nordin (2001)
- Buellia rorida Hellb. (1896)
- Buellia rosellotincta (Nyl.) Vain. (1901)
- Buellia rubescens (Th. Fr.) Eckfeldt (1895)
- Buellia rubroreagens A. Nordin (2001)
- Buellia rudis (Stizenb.) Zahlbr. (1931)
- Buellia rufofuscescens Stizenb. (1890)
- Buellia rugosissima Giralt, van den Boom & Elix (2014) – Guatemala
- Buellia rugulata Elix & van den Boom (2022)
- Buellia russa (Hue) Darb. (1923)
- Buellia russellii C.W. Dodge & G.E. Baker (1938)
- Buellia rusticorum (Stizenb.) Zahlbr. (1931)
- Buellia ryanii Bungartz (2004)

== S ==
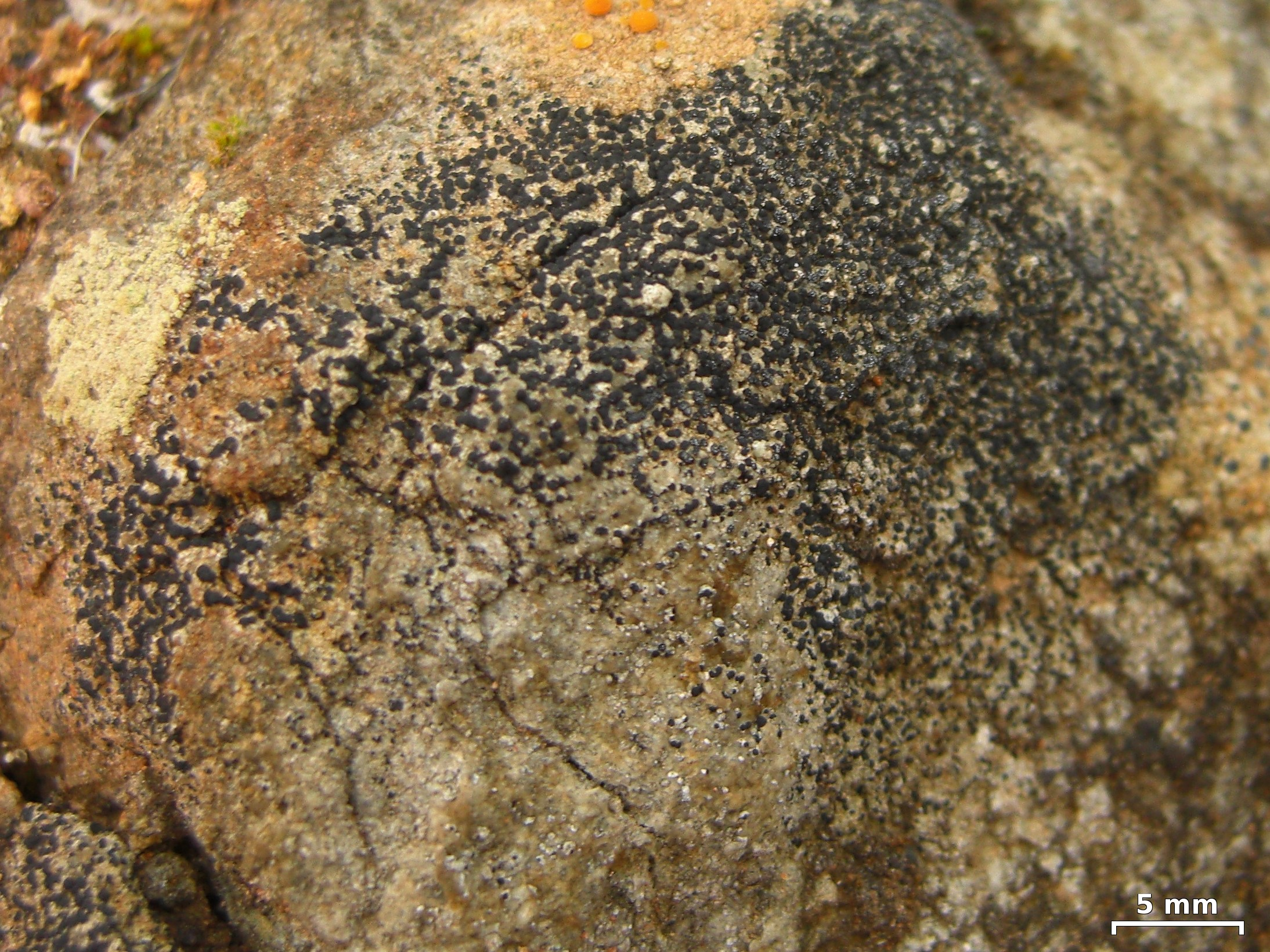
Buellia sequax

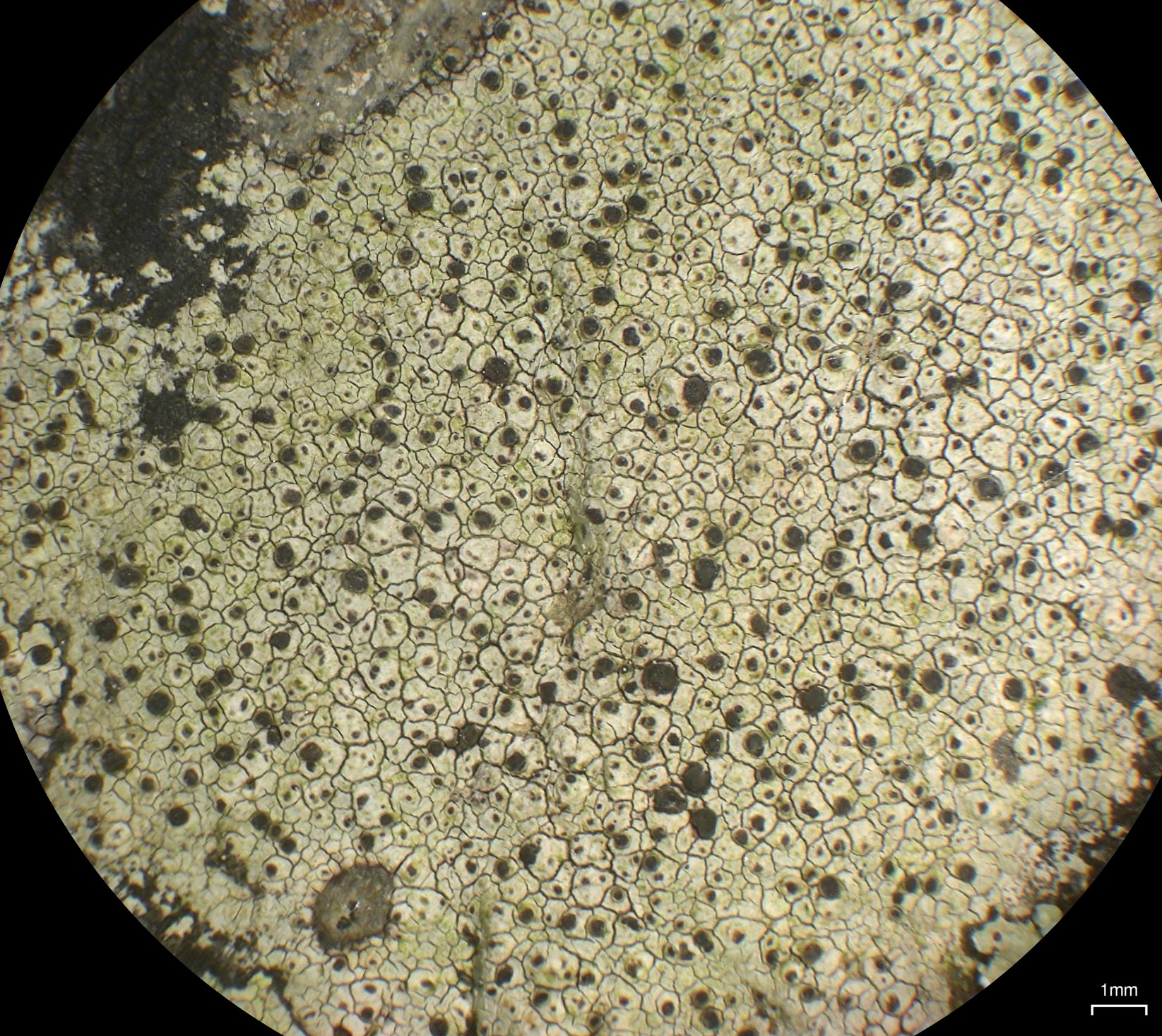
Buellia spuria

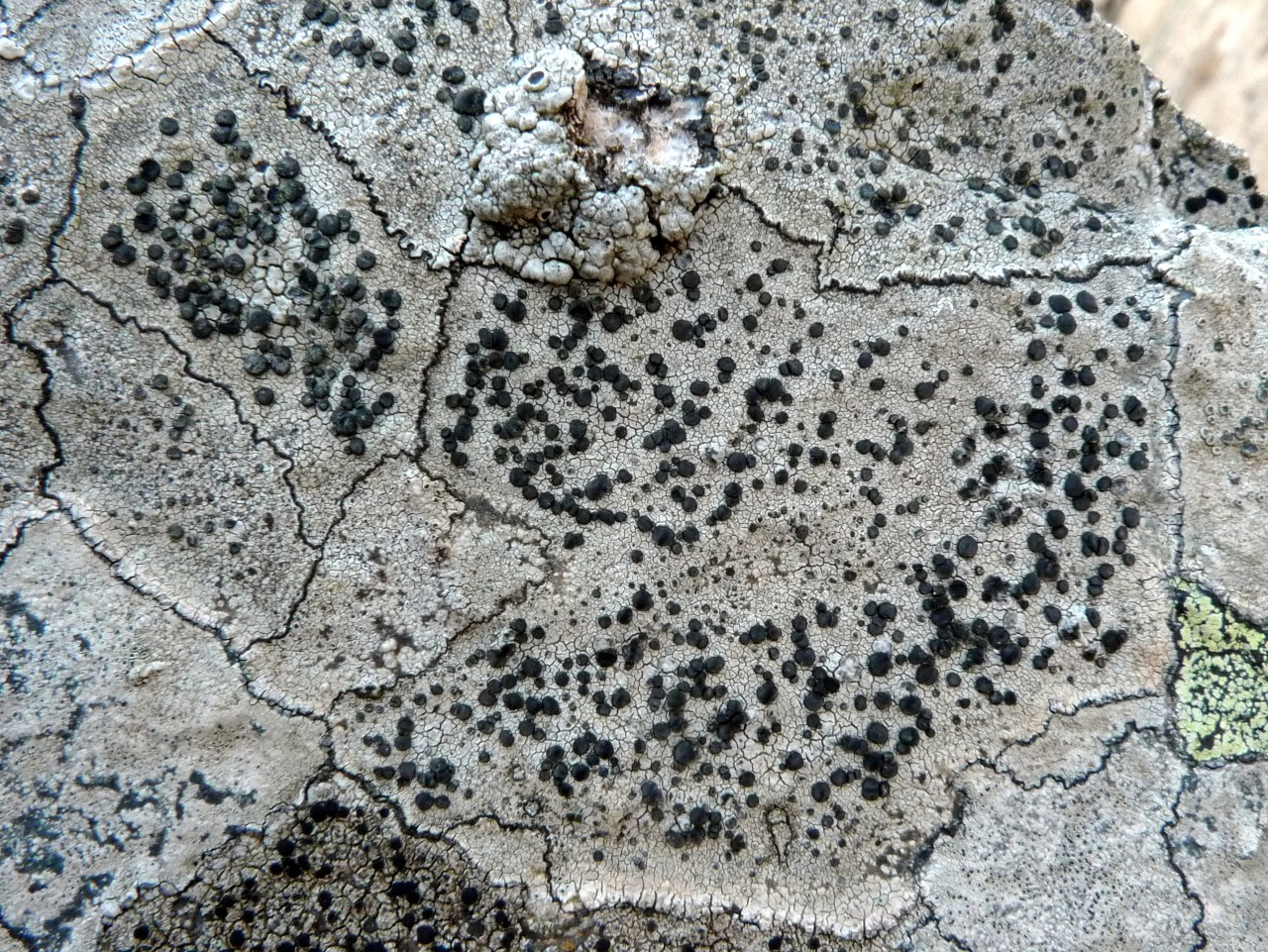
Buellia subdisciformis

- Buellia salesianorum Sambo (1926)
- Buellia saltensis H. Magn. (1947)
- Buellia samothrakiana Szatala (1943)
- Buellia sancti-paulii B. de Lesd. (1931)
- Buellia sandstedei (Zwackh) Sandst. (1912)
- Buellia sanguinariella (Nyl.) Zahlbr. (1907)
- Buellia sanguinea (Müll. Arg.) C.W. Dodge (1971)
- Buellia sanguinolenta T. Schauer (1965) – Europe
- Buellia saprophila (B. de Lesd.) Scheid. (1987)
- Buellia sarcogynoides H. Magn. (1940)
- Buellia sardiniensis J. Steiner (1907)
- Buellia saxicola B. de Lesd. (1932)
- Buellia saximontana Egan (1971)
- Buellia saxorum A. Massal. (1852)
- Buellia saxosa Flagey (1892)
- Buellia sbarbaronis B. de Lesd. (1930)
- Buellia scalpturata Vain. (1909)
- Buellia schaereri De Not. (1846)
- Buellia scheideggeriana Bricaud & Cl. Roux (1991)
- Buellia schinziana Müll. Arg. (1888)
- Buellia schisticola H. Magn. (1954)
- Buellia schisticola B. de Lesd. (1954)
- Buellia sciodes (Nyl.) Boistel (1903)
- Buellia scotochroa (Nyl.) Zahlbr. (1931)
- Buellia scutariensis J. Steiner (1899)
- Buellia secedens (Nyl.) Arnold (1871)
- Buellia sejuncta J. Steiner (1907)
- Buellia sensitiva Zahlbr. (1930)
- Buellia seppeltii Elix (2017) – Macquarie Island
- Buellia septentrionalis Vain. (1909)
- Buellia sequax (Nyl.) Zahlbr. (1931)
- Buellia servilosina Elix & Kantvilas (2017) – Australia
- Buellia setschwana (Zahlbr.) Q.Y. Zhong & Xin Y. Wang (2023)
- Buellia sharpiana Lendemer & R.C. Harris (2013) – United States
- Buellia sheardii Bungartz (2004)
- Buellia silicicola B. de Lesd. (1932)
- Buellia siphoniatula Zahlbr. (1924)
- Buellia siplei C.W. Dodge & G.E. Baker (1938)
- Buellia sipmanii Bungartz & V. Wirth (2009)
- Buellia smaragdula B. de Lesd. (1932)
- Buellia soboensis Yasuda ex Räsänen (1940)
- Buellia sordida (A. Massal.) Jatta (1900)
- Buellia sordidula Jatta (1906)
- Buellia soredians Filson (1974)
- Buellia sorediata (Tuck.) H. Magn. (1955)
- Buellia sorediosa Reichert & Galun (1960)
- Buellia sphaeralis (Körb.) Anzi (1866)
- Buellia sphyridii (Stein) Bagl. (1865)
- Buellia springvalensis Elix & A. Knight (2021)
- Buellia spuria (Schaer.) Anzi (1860)
- Buellia squamosa B. de Lesd. (1933)
- Buellia squamosoareolata Vain. (1921)
- Buellia squamulata (Nyl.) Zahlbr. (1931)
- Buellia stanleyi (Stein) Müll. Arg. (1890)
- Buellia steineri Servít (1937)
- Buellia stellata C.W. Dodge & G.E. Baker (1938)
- Buellia stellulata (Taylor) Mudd (1861)
- Buellia stigmaea Tuck. (1888)
- Buellia stillingiana J. Steiner (1919)
- Buellia stipitata Riddle (1912)
- Buellia stizenbergeri Zahlbr. (1931)
- Buellia straminea Tuck. (1902)
- Buellia stramineoatra Vain. (1907)
- Buellia subadjuncta Elix & Kantvilas (2017) – Australia
- Buellia subaeruginosa (Müll. Arg.) C.W. Dodge (1971)
- Buellia subaethalea B. de Lesd. (1914)
- Buellia subalbula (Nyl.) Müll. Arg. (1880)
- Buellia subambigua Werner (1956)
- Buellia subannulata Zahlbr. (1930)
- Buellia subareolata Müll. Arg. (1888) – South America
- Buellia subarmeniaca Zahlbr. (1930)
- Buellia subarnoldii Elix & H. Mayrhofer (2022)
- Buellia subatra Erichsen (1930)
- Buellia subbadia Anzi (1868)
- Buellia subcallispora H. Magn. (1955) – Hawaii
- Buellia subcanescens Werner (1956)
- Buellia subconcava Müll. Arg. (1886)
- Buellia subconcinna (Vain.) Zahlbr. (1931)
- Buellia subcoronata (Müll. Arg.) Malme (1927)
- Buellia subcrassata (Pusswald) Elix (2009)
- Buellia subdisciformis (Leight.) Jatta (1892)
- Buellia subdispersa Mig. (1924)
- Buellia subdispersula Riddle (1923)
- Buellia subdives Vain. (1907)
- Buellia subeffigurata Elix, H. Mayrhofer & Wetschnig (2021) – South Africa
- Buellia subericola Giralt & van den Boom (2013)
- Buellia subfrigida Mas. Inoue (1993)
- Buellia subglaziouana S.R. Singh & D.D. Awasthi (1981)
- Buellia subgranularis H. Magn. (1955)
- Buellia subhalonia S.Y. Kondr., Lőkös, Oh, Kondratiuk, Parnikoza & Hur (2020)
- Buellia subimmersa Müll. Arg. (1894)
- Buellia subisabellina Zahlbr. (1931)
- Buellia subjuncta (Nyl.) Müll. Arg. (1888)
- Buellia sublauri-cassiae Ekanayaka & K.D. Hyde (2019)
- Buellia submaritima Müll. Arg. (1893)
- Buellia subnexa Vain. (1909)
- Buellia subnumerosa Watanuki & H. Harada (2017) – Japan
- Buellia subocculta Jatta (1902)
- Buellia subocellata Müll. Arg. (1872)
- Buellia subochracea (Zahlbr.) J. Steiner (1919)
- Buellia subpunctiformis B. de Lesd. (1914)
- Buellia subramanyamii R. Chowdhury (1974)
- Buellia subrepleta (Stirt.) Zahlbr. (1931)
- Buellia subsensitiva Imshaug (1955)
- Buellia subsororioides S.R. Singh & D.D. Awasthi (1981)
- Buellia subsquamescens Jatta (1906)
- Buellia subsquamosa J. Steiner (1907)
- Buellia substellulans Zahlbr. (1931)
- Buellia substellulata J. Steiner (1919)
- Buellia substigmatea Müll. Arg. (1882)
- Buellia substigmea S.R. Singh & D.D. Awasthi (1981)
- Buellia subtabacina Malme (1927)
- Buellia subtegens Js. Murray (1963)
- Buellia subtenebrosa Malme (1918)
- Buellia subtilis (Vain.) C.W. Dodge (1971)
- Buellia subtristis (Nyl.) Zahlbr. (1931)
- Buellia subtumida J. Steiner (1919)
- Buellia subviolascens Zahlbr. (1917)
- Buellia subviridescens (Nyl. ex Th. Fr.) Vain. (1909)
- Buellia succedens (Nyl.) Arnold (1871)
- Buellia sulphurea Malme (1927)
- Buellia sulphurica Bungartz & Aptroot (2011)
- Buellia superans (Nyl.) Mong. (1900)
- Buellia superba Darb. (1923)
- Buellia supercrassa H. Olivier (1907)
- Buellia suttonensis Elix & A. Knight (2017) – New Zealand

== T ==
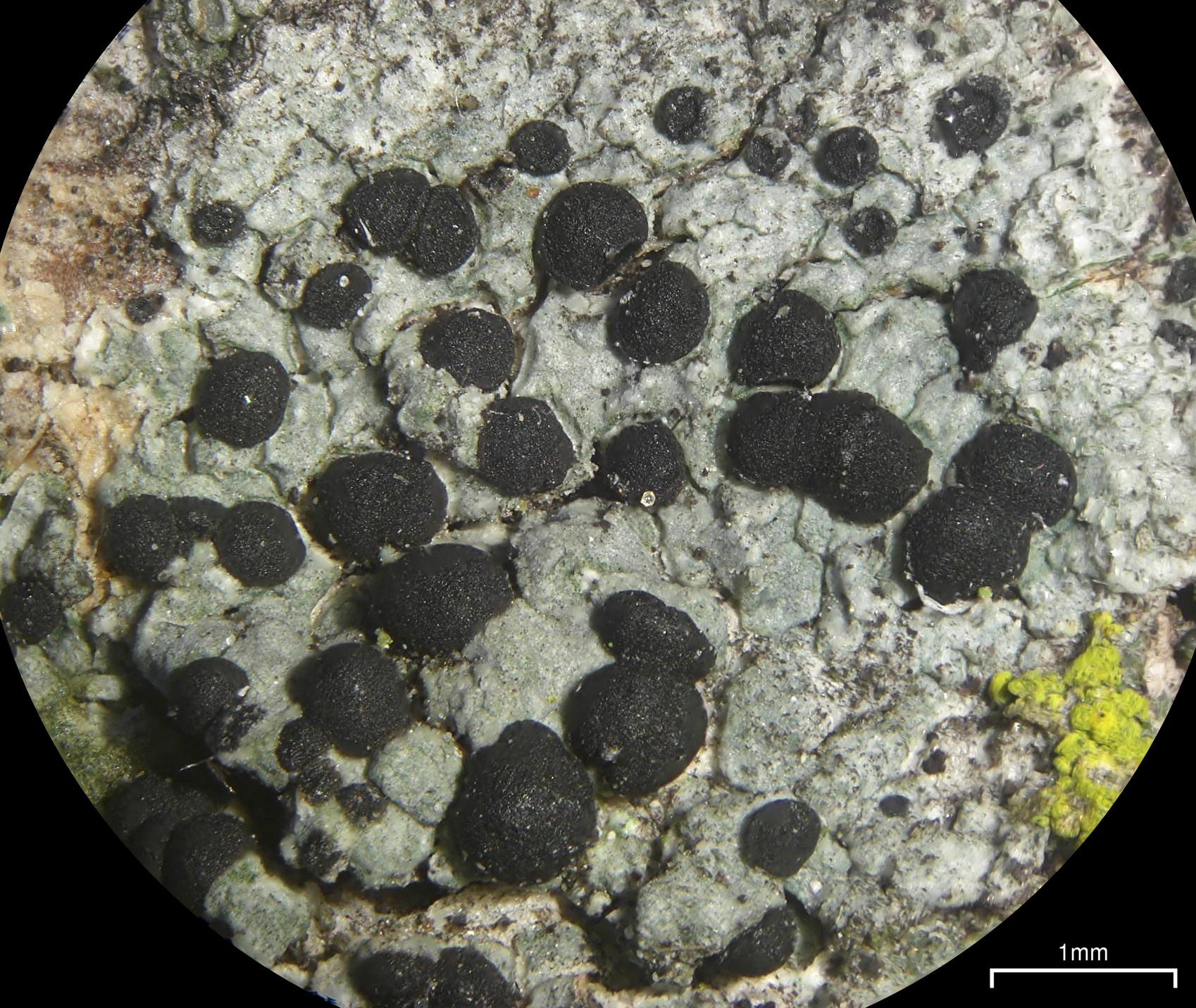
Buellia triseptata

- Buellia tabacina (Müll. Arg.) Malme (1927)
- Buellia tabarina Elix (2023)
- Buellia tablasensis Herre (1957)
- Buellia taishanensis Q.D. Wang & Z.F. Jia (2018) – China
- Buellia takashimana (Nyl.) Zahlbr. (1931)
- Buellia taltalensis C.W. Dodge (1967)
- Buellia tehuacana Vain. (1926)
- Buellia teloschistis Vězda (1988)
- Buellia tenayucae B. de Lesd. (1929)
- Buellia tephrodes I.M. Lamb (1955)
- Buellia tergestina J. Steiner & Zahlbr. (1894)
- Buellia tergua Bungartz (2004)
- Buellia termitophila Malme (1927)
- Buellia termitum Vain. (1890)
- Buellia tesserata Körb. (1860)
- Buellia testacea Müll. Arg. (1889)
- Buellia testaceina Elix & Kantvilas (2013) – Australia
- Buellia tetrapla (Nyl.) Müll. Arg. (1888)
- Buellia tetraspora (De Not.) Jatta (1911)
- Buellia tetrastichella (Nyl.) Zahlbr. (1931)
- Buellia thioconis Norman (1868)
- Buellia thionella (Norman) Zahlbr. (1931)
- Buellia thomsonii C.W. Dodge (1971)
- Buellia tibestica Faurel & Schotter (1958)
- Buellia tincta Steiner ex H. Magn. (1945)
- Buellia tinderryensis Elix & P.M. McCarthy (2017) – Australia
- Buellia tolucae B. de Lesd. (1933)
- Buellia tombadorensis A. Nordin (2001)
- Buellia tomnashiana Giralt & van den Boom (2011) – Canary Islands
- Buellia toninioides Bagl. (1875)
- Buellia trachyspora Vain. (1915)
- Buellia transvaalica (Stizenb.) Zahlbr. (1931)
- Buellia trifracta J. Steiner (1918)
- Buellia triplicans Zahlbr. (1932)
- Buellia triseptata A. Nordin (1999)
- Buellia tristicolor Zahlbr. (1925)
- Buellia tristis Darb. (1923)
- Buellia tsunodae Yasuda ex Räsänen (1940)
- Buellia tuamotensis Herre (1953)
- Buellia tuapekensis Elix & A. Knight (2017) – New Zealand
- Buellia tucsonensis Zahlbr. (1909)
- Buellia tumida (A. Massal.) Bagl. (1857)
- Buellia tunetana (Hue) Zahlbr. (1931)
- Buellia turgescentoides Fink (1921)
- Buellia turgida (A. Massal.) Lettau (1912)
- Buellia tuxenii Darb. (1923)
- Buellia tyrolensis Körb. (1860)

== U ==
- Buellia uberior Anzi (1866)
- Buellia uberiuscula (Nyl.) Zahlbr. (1931)
- Buellia ulleungdoensis S.Y. Kondr., Lőkös & Hur (2017)
- Buellia ulliae Elix (2018)
- Buellia ultima Lindau (1909)
- Buellia umbrina Malme (1928)
- Buellia urceolariae (Nyl.) H. Olivier (1905)
- Buellia uruguayensis Etayo & Osorio (2004)

== V ==
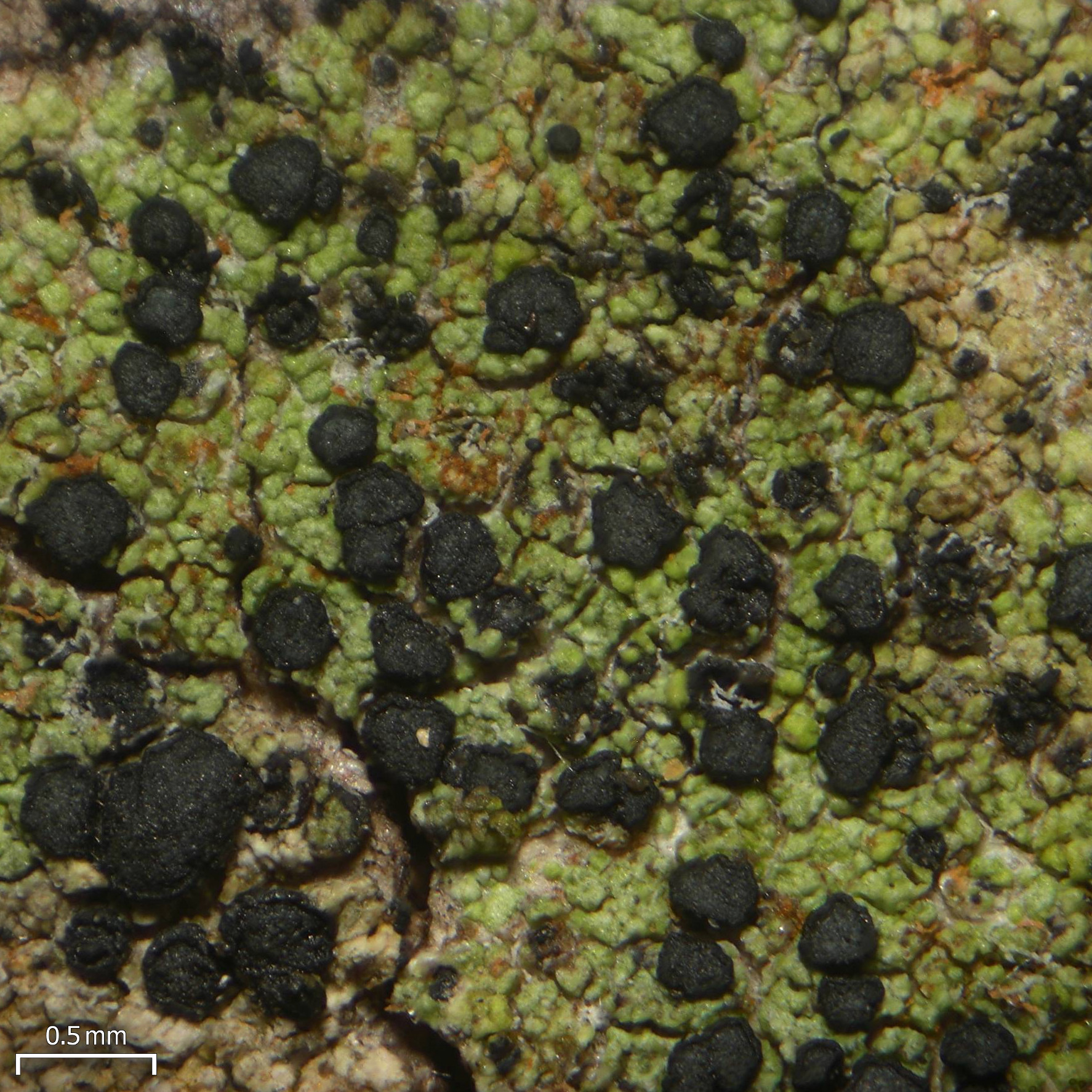
Buellia vernicoma

- Buellia vagans Müll. Arg. (1872)
- Buellia vandenboomii Giralt & M. Brand (2009)
- Buellia variabilis Darb. (1923)
- Buellia venantii (Harm.) Zahlbr. (1931)
- Buellia ventricosa Müll. Arg. (1883)
- Buellia vernicoma (Tuck.) Tuck. (1866)
- Buellia vernicomoidea (Fink) Zahlbr. (1931)
- Buellia versicolor Müll. Arg. (1893)
- Buellia vetusta (Delile) Müll. Arg. (1880)
- Buellia vieillardii Räsänen (1944)
- Buellia vilis Th. Fr. (1867)
- Buellia violacea B. de Lesd. (1929)
- Buellia violaceofusca G. Thor & Muhr (1991) – Sweden
- Buellia violascens Vain. (1890)
- Buellia viridicata (Stizenb.) Zahlbr. (1931)
- Buellia viridis Körb. ex Stein (1879)
- Buellia viridula Ekanayaka & K.D. Hyde (2019)
- Buellia vouauxii Calat. & Barreno (1995)
- Buellia vulcani (Hepp) Kremp. (1907)

== W ==
- Buellia weberi Elix (2017) – Australia
- Buellia wilsoniana Müll. Arg. (1893)

== X ==
- Buellia xanthinula (Müll. Arg.) Malme (1927)
- Buellia xantholepis Müll. Arg. (1881)
- Buellia xantholeuca Bungartz & U. Grube (2011)
- Buellia xanthonica (Elix) Elix (2009)

== Y ==
- Buellia yasudae Vain. (1918)
- Buellia yaucoensis Vain. (1929)
- Buellia yilliminningensis Elix & Kantvilas (2013) – Australia
- Buellia yoshimurae A. Higashi, Watanuki & H. Harada (2017) – Japan
- Buellia yunnana Zahlbr. (1930)

== Z ==
- Buellia zabothica (Körb.) Räsänen (1931)
- Buellia zahlbruckneri J. Steiner (1909)
- Buellia zapotensis B. de Lesd. (1914)
- Buellia zoharyi Galun ex Poelt & M. Sulzer (1974)
- Buellia zonulata Malme (1927)
