= Buellia quarryana =

Scientific classification
- Kingdom: Fungi
- Division: Ascomycota
- Class: Lecanoromycetes
- Order: Caliciales
- Family: Caliciaceae
- Genus: Buellia
- Species: B. quarryana

Binomial name
- Buellia quarryana Elix & P.M.McCarthy (2020)
- Holotype site: Quarry Beach in East Gippsland

Species of lichen

Buellia quarryana is a species of crustose lichen in the family Caliciaceae. Found in southeastern Australia, it was described as a new species in 2020 by lichenologists John Elix and Patrick McCarthy. The type specimen was collected from Quarry Beach in East Gippsland (Victoria), where it was found growing on siliceous rocks along the seashore. The specific epithet refers to the type locality. It has also been found on the coast of southern New South Wales.

The expected results of standard chemical spot tests for Buellia quarryana are K+ (yellow then red), C−, and PD+ (orange). The lichen contains the secondary chemicals norstictic acid (major) and connorstictic acid (trace amounts), which are detectable using thin-layer chromatography.

== See also ==
- List of Buellia species
