= Buellia georgei =

Scientific classification
- Domain: Eukaryota
- Kingdom: Fungi
- Division: Ascomycota
- Class: Lecanoromycetes
- Order: Caliciales
- Family: Caliciaceae
- Genus: Buellia
- Species: B. georgei

Binomial name
- Buellia georgei Trinkaus, H.Mayrhofer & Elix (2001)

Species of lichen

Buellia georgei is a species of lichen in the family Caliciaceae. Found in Australia, it was formally described as a new species in 2001 by lichenologists Ulrike Trinkaus, Helmut Mayrhofer, and John Elix. The type specimen was collected in Yanchep National Park (Western Australia); here it was found growing on soft limestone. It has also been recorded from South Australia, New South Wales, and the Australian Capital Territory; preferred habitats are calcareous outcrops, on thin soil over limestone, or rarely on calcareous soil. The lichen produces some secondary compounds: arthothelin as a major metabolite, and minor amounts of 4,5-dichloronorlichexanthone and thiophanic acid. The specific epithet honours Western Australian botanist Alex George.

== See also ==
- List of Buellia species
