= Buellia tomnashiana =

Scientific classification
- Kingdom: Fungi
- Division: Ascomycota
- Class: Lecanoromycetes
- Order: Caliciales
- Family: Caliciaceae
- Genus: Buellia
- Species: B. tomnashiana

Binomial name
- Buellia tomnashiana Giralt & van den Boom (2011)

Species of lichen-forming fungus

Buellia tomnashiana is a species of foliicolous (leaf-dwelling) lichen in the family Caliciaceae. It is found in the Canary Islands, where it grows on the living leaves of the Azores laurel (Laurus azorica). The type specimen of Buellia tomnashiana was collected by Pieter P.G. van den Boom in 2007 from the Canary Islands, Spain. The type locality is located north of Santiago del Teide, roughly 2 km west-southwest of Erjos, along an open path leading to Las Portelas (Tenerife). The holotype is deposited in the herbarium at Arizona State University (ASU). The species epithet, tomnashia, honours the American lichenologist Thomas Hawkes Nash.

== See also ==
- List of Buellia species
