= Buellia sharpiana =

Conservation status
- Vulnerable (IUCN 3.1)

Scientific classification
- Kingdom: Fungi
- Division: Ascomycota
- Class: Lecanoromycetes
- Order: Caliciales
- Family: Caliciaceae
- Genus: Buellia
- Species: B. sharpiana

Binomial name
- Buellia sharpiana Lendemer & R.C.Harris (2013)

Species of lichen-forming fungus

Buellia sharpiana is a species of crustose lichen in the family Physciaceae. It was formally described as a new species in 2013 by lichenologists James Lendemer and Richard C. Harris. The type specimen was collected from the summit area of Mount Le Conte at an altitude of 6,300 ft (1,900 m). The specific epithet sharpiana honors Evelyn Bunches Sharp, wife of bryologist Aaron J. Sharp. The Sharps collected samples for the cryptogamic herbarium at the University of Tennessee at Knoxville, especially after the original collection was destroyed by a fire in 1998.

In 2020, the lichen was assessed as a vulnerable species by the IUCN.

== See also ==
- List of Buellia species
