= Buellia lichexanthonica =

Scientific classification
- Domain: Eukaryota
- Kingdom: Fungi
- Division: Ascomycota
- Class: Lecanoromycetes
- Order: Caliciales
- Family: Caliciaceae
- Genus: Buellia
- Species: B. lichexanthonica

Binomial name
- Buellia lichexanthonica Aptroot & M.Cáceres (2017)

Species of lichen

Buellia lichexanthonica is a species of saxicolous (rock-dwelling) lichen in the family Caliciaceae. Found in Brazil, it was formally described as a new species in 2017 by lichenologists André Aptroot and Marcela Eugenia da Silva Cáceres. The type specimen was collected by the authors near the Poço Azul (Riachão, Maranhão), at an altitude of about 450 m (1,480 ft); here, in Cerrado, it was found growing on sandstone. The lichen has a thin (0.1–0.2 mm), dull yellow thallus covered with xanthone crystals. Its ascomata are round and black, about 0.2–0.5 mm in diameter with a flat disc. The ascospores are dark brown with an ellipsoid shape, one septum, and measure 11–13 by 6–7.5 μm. The specific epithet lichexanthonica refers to the presence of 4,5-dichlorolichexanthone, a lichexanthone derivative that is found in the cortex of the thallus.

== See also ==
- List of Buellia species
