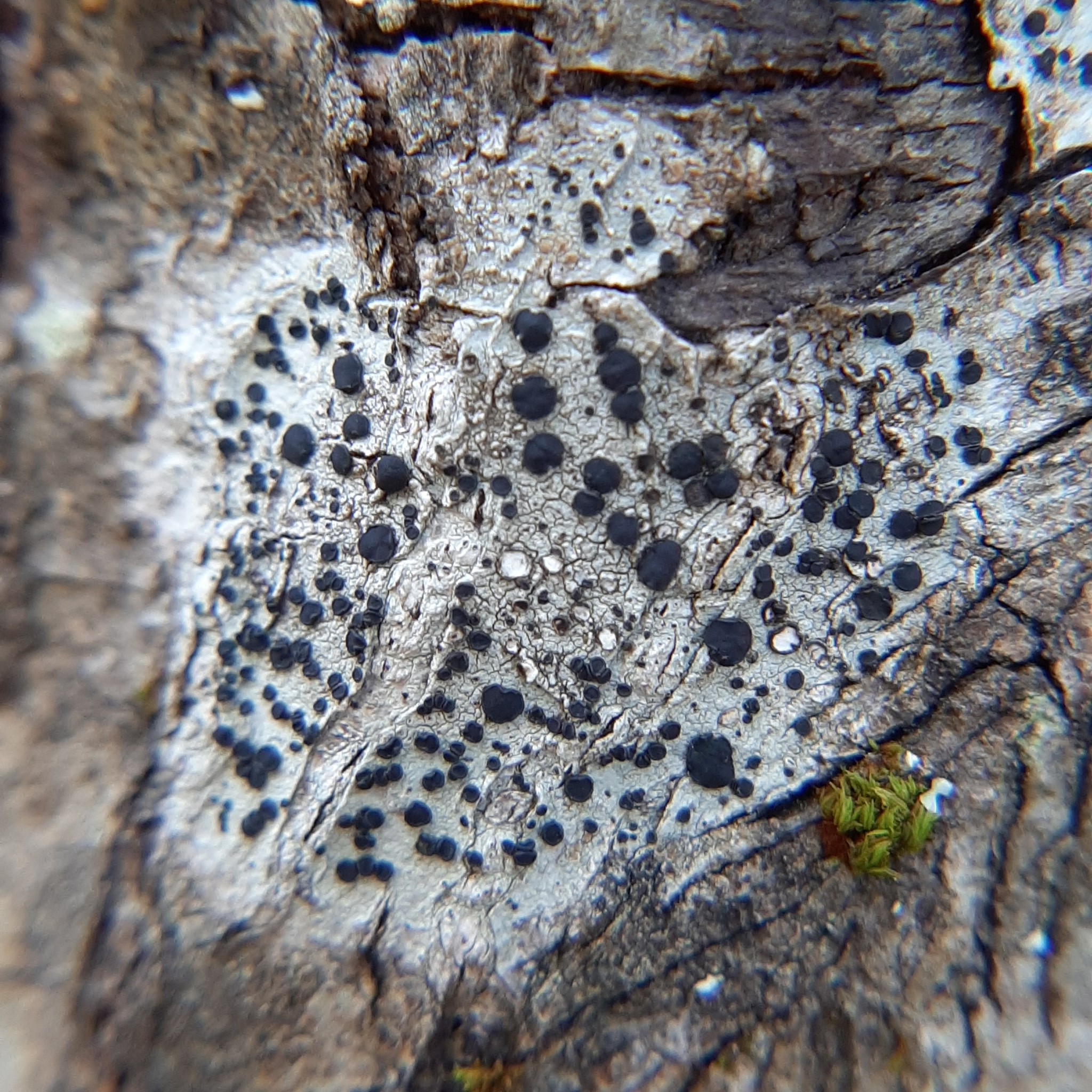

Conservation status
- Secure (NatureServe)

Scientific classification
- Kingdom: Fungi
- Division: Ascomycota
- Class: Lecanoromycetes
- Order: Caliciales
- Family: Caliciaceae
- Genus: Buellia
- Species: B. erubescens

Binomial name
- Buellia erubescens Arnold (1875)

= Buellia erubescens =

Species of lichen

Buellia erubescens, the common button lichen, is a species of lichen in the genus Buellia. It is found commonly on the bark and occasionally on the wood of Quercus, Pinus, Juniperus, or other species of trees with bark that has generally low pH. It is common between 600 and 3,000 m (2,000 and 9,800 ft) elevation, and is common in submontane to subalpine forests.

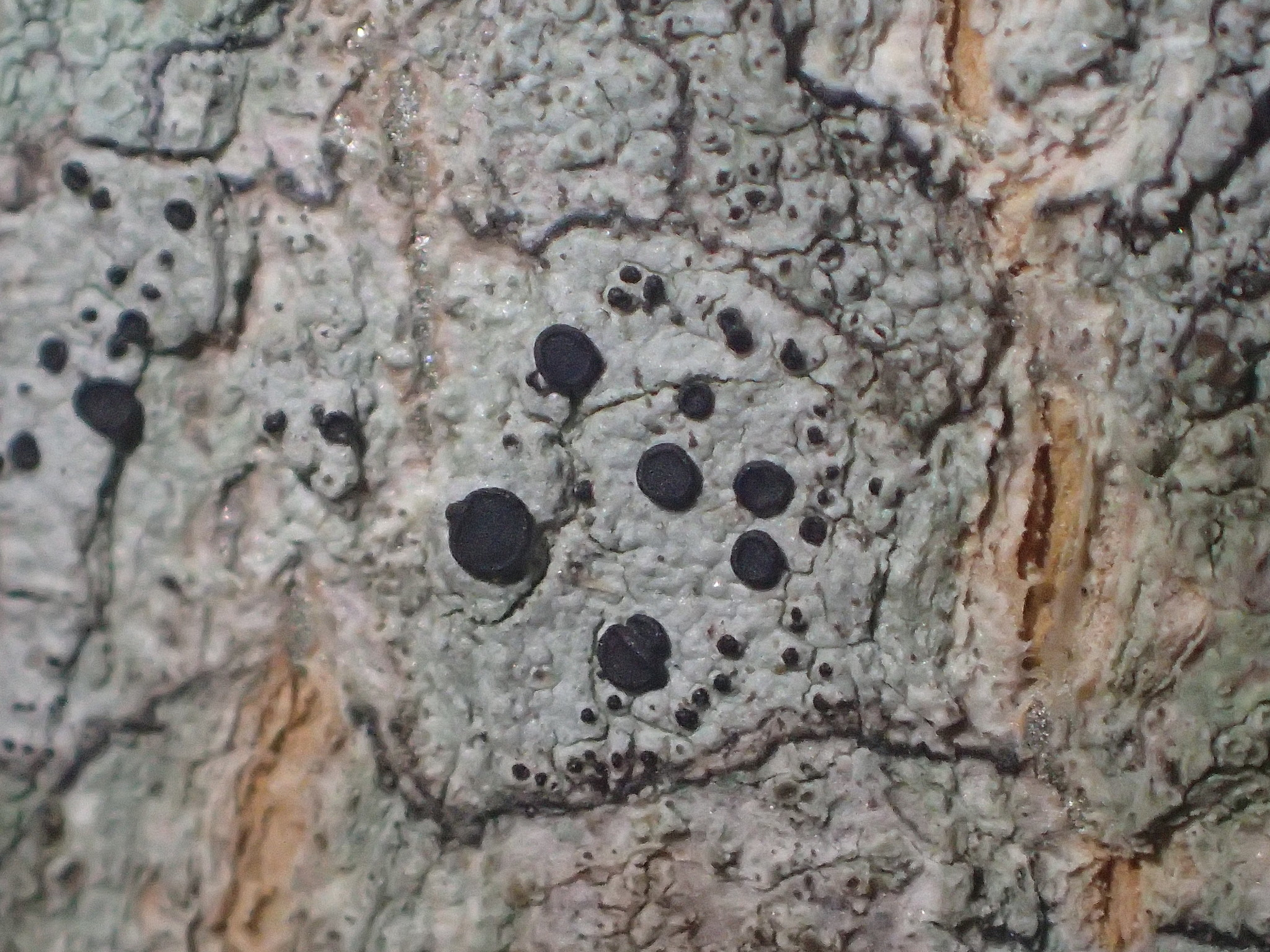
Buellia erubescens

== Distribution ==
Buellia erubescens is widely distributed throughout North America and Europe.

== See also ==
- List of Buellia species
