= Buellia multispora =

Scientific classification
- Domain: Eukaryota
- Kingdom: Fungi
- Division: Ascomycota
- Class: Lecanoromycetes
- Order: Caliciales
- Family: Caliciaceae
- Genus: Buellia
- Species: B. multispora

Binomial name
- Buellia multispora Kalb & Vězda (1979)

Synonyms
- Amandinea multispora (Kalb & Vězda) Marbach (2000)

Species of lichen

Buellia multispora is a species of crustose lichen in the family Caliciaceae. Described as a new species in 1979, it is found in Hawaii.

== Taxonomy ==
It was formally described as a new species in 1979 by the lichenologists Klaus Kalb and Antonín Vězda. The type specimen was collected from Keawaula Valley, on the shore of Oahu, Hawaii, on March 16, 1977. The species is similar in appearance to Buellia polyspora var. diminuta, but differs in having smaller spores and a higher number of spores per ascus (50–60). Bernhard Marbach proposed to transfer the taxon to the genus Amandinea in 2000.

== Description ==
The thallus (main body) of B. multispora is epiphloeodal (growing on the surface of bark), thin, measuring 0.5–1 cm wide, with a finely cracked-areolate texture and grayish-white coloration. It lacks a distinct boundary and does not show color reactions with common lichen chemical spot tests (K−, PD−, C−).

The apothecia (fruiting bodies) are relatively numerous, circular, attached to the substrate, black, and lack pruina (a powdery coating). They measure 0.3–0.5 mm wide and 0.1–0.15 mm high. Initially, they have a thin margin and flat disk, but eventually develop a convex disk with the margin disappearing.

Microscopically, the excipulum (outer layer of the apothecium) is thin (approximately 20–25 μm), pale brown on the inside and blackish-brown on the outside, with no reaction to K. The hypothecium (tissue beneath the hymenium) is pale brown and shows no reaction to K. The hymenium (spore-producing layer) is 50–60 μm tall, colorless, and turns blue with iodine (J+ caerulescent).

The paraphyses (sterile filaments among the asci) are simple or forked, 1.5 μm thick, with capitate (head-like) tips measuring 4–4.5 μm across, and blackish-brown in color. The asci (spore sacs) are cylindrical-clavate and polysporous, containing 50–60 spores each. The spores are ellipsoidal, straight, blackish-brown, single-septate (divided by one septum), with relatively thin walls, measuring 8–10 μm long and 3–3.5 μm thick.

Lichenodiplis fallaciosa is a lichenicolous (lichen-dwelling) fungus that has been recorded parasitizing Buellia multispora.

== See also ==
- List of Buellia species
