= Buellia epifimbriata =

Scientific classification
- Domain: Eukaryota
- Kingdom: Fungi
- Division: Ascomycota
- Class: Lecanoromycetes
- Order: Caliciales
- Family: Caliciaceae
- Genus: Buellia
- Species: B. epifimbriata

Binomial name
- Buellia epifimbriata Sipman (2002)

Species of lichen

Buellia epifimbriata is a species of lichenicolous (lichen-eating) crustose lichen in the family Caliciaceae. It is only known to occur on Antiparos and Kos, two Greek islands in the southern Aegean Sea.

== Taxonomy ==
Buellia epifimbriata was formally described as a new species in 2002 by Dutch lichenologist Harrie Sipman. The type specimen was collected by Sipman and Thomas Raus, northwest of Hagios Georgios (Antiparos, in the Cyclades archipelago). The habitat consists of outcrops of schistose rock, on top of coastal hills with low-lying shrubs. The species epithet epifimbriata refers to the name of its host.

== Description ==
Buellia epifimbriata grows as a parasite on the thallus of the crustose lichen Buellia fimbriata, but it forms its own thallus, consisting of crusty, dark grey-brown areolate patches typically measuring 3–5 mm (0.12–0.20 in) wide. Its ascospores, which number 8 per ascus, are grey, oblong, with smooth walls, and measure 10 by 5–7 μm. The spores are divided into two compartments with a thin, transverse, septum in the middle. Buellia epifimbriata contains norstictic acid, a lichen product that can be detected using thin-layer chromatography. The presence of this substance is one characteristic that distinguishes it from other lichenicolous Buellia species.

== Habitat and distribution ==
Buellia epifimbriata is known two occur on the islands of Antiparos and Kos. It occurs in association with its host, which itself grows on the steep faces of exposed volcanic rocks at elevations between 50 and 200 m (160 and 660 ft).

== See also ==
- List of Buellia species
