= Buellia peregrina =

Scientific classification
- Kingdom: Fungi
- Division: Ascomycota
- Class: Lecanoromycetes
- Order: Caliciales
- Family: Caliciaceae
- Genus: Buellia
- Species: B. peregrina

Binomial name
- Buellia peregrina Bungartz & V.Wirth (2007)

Species of lichen

Buellia peregrina is a species of saxicolous (rock-dwelling), crustose lichen in the family Caliciaceae. It is found in the Namib desert in Namibia.

== Taxonomy ==
The lichen was formally described as a new species in 2007 by lichenologists Frank Bungartz and Volkmar Wirth. The type specimen was collected between Swakopmund and Hentiesbai in the Namib (a coastal desert in Southern Africa). The species name originates from the Latin word peregrinus, ("foreign"). This signifies that all specimens were discovered on allochthonous limestone, meaning stones not originally part of the sediment layer in that specific region. It is the only species in genus Buellia that grows euendolithically, i.e., with its thallus entirely within its rock substratum.

== Description ==
The thallus of this crustose lichen has a pale beige to rose surface that changes the colour of the white limestone it inhabits. A prothallus is present but barely distinguishable from the substratum. The apothecia are lecideine and initially immersed in cavities; they typically measure 0.2–0.4 mm in diameter. They emerge at maturity with a black, plane, and epruinose to faintly pruinose disc that becomes convex.

The proper margin of the apothecia is thin and black, with a narrow, poorly differentiated exciple containing deep blue and reddish-brown pigmentation. The hymenium is hyaline, and the paraphyses are simple to moderately branched with a deep blue pigmented cap. The subhymenium is deep blue (a distinctive character of this species), while the hypothecium is reddish-brown. The asci are 8-spored and clavate, with oblong to ellipsoid, one-septate ascospores that do not display any ornamentation. Pycnidia were not observed in this lichen. Collected specimens did not contain any detectable lichen products.

== See also ==
- List of Buellia species
