= Buellia magaliesbergensis =

Scientific classification
- Domain: Eukaryota
- Kingdom: Fungi
- Division: Ascomycota
- Class: Lecanoromycetes
- Order: Caliciales
- Family: Caliciaceae
- Genus: Buellia
- Species: B. magaliesbergensis

Binomial name
- Buellia magaliesbergensis Elix & H.Mayrhofer (2021)

Species of lichen

Buellia magaliesbergensis is a species of crustose lichen in the family Caliciaceae. Found in South Africa, it was formally described as a new species in 2021 by lichenologists John Alan Elix and Helmut Mayrhofer. The type specimen was collected in the Magaliesberg Range (Orange Free State) at an altitude of 1,720 m (5,640 ft). Here, the saxicolous lichen was found growing on rocks on the ground. The species epithet refers to the type locality, the only location where the lichen has been documented. The results of standard chemical spot tests are thallus K+ (yellow), P+ (yellow-orange), and C−. Buellia magaliesbergensis contains norstictic acid as a major secondary chemical and connorstictic acid as a minor compound.

== See also ==
- List of Buellia species
