= Buellia subeffigurata =

Scientific classification
- Domain: Eukaryota
- Kingdom: Fungi
- Division: Ascomycota
- Class: Lecanoromycetes
- Order: Caliciales
- Family: Caliciaceae
- Genus: Buellia
- Species: B. subeffigurata

Binomial name
- Buellia subeffigurata Elix & H.Mayrhofer & Wetschnig (2021)

Species of lichen

Buellia subeffigurata is a species of crustose lichen in the family Caliciaceae. Found in South Africa, it was formally described as a new species in 2021 by John Alan Elix, Helmut Mayrhofer, and Wolfgang Wetschnig. The type specimen was collected in the Knersvlakte (Namaqualand, northern Cape Province), at an altitude of 150 m (490 ft). Here the saxicolous lichen was found growing on quartziferous rock. The species epithet refers to its subeffigurate marginal lobes (i.e., more or less irregular or without form). The results of standard chemical spot tests are: thallus K+ (yellow), P+ (yellow-orange), and C−. Buellia subeffigurata contains thiophanic acid as a major secondary chemical, and isoarthothelin and atranorin as minor compounds.

== See also ==
- List of Buellia species
