= Buellia asterella =

Conservation status
- Critically Endangered (IUCN 3.1)

Scientific classification
- Kingdom: Fungi
- Division: Ascomycota
- Class: Lecanoromycetes
- Order: Caliciales
- Family: Caliciaceae
- Genus: Buellia
- Species: B. asterella

Binomial name
- Buellia asterella Poelt & Sulzer (1974)

Species of lichen

Buellia asterella, commonly referred to as the starry breck lichen, is a rare, black and white lichen in the family Caliciaceae. Once found all across the central European grasslands, it was described as new to science in 1974. Today, it is classified by the IUCN Red List as Critically Endangered and only found in select regions in Norway and Germany.

== Taxonomy ==
This lichen was originally described by Poelt and Sulzer in 1974. There aren't any synonyms for this species of lichen.

== Description ==
Buellia asterella is a white and black lichen, growing on the surface of the soil where it is found. The white section of this lichen is the thallus and the black discs found on top are its fruiting structure. These black discs produce their asci, which only contain 4 spores per asci. This is very uncharacteristic for the phylum of Ascomycota as many are found with 8 spores in their asci. Their spores also do not have any internal wall thickening.

== Habitat and distribution ==
Buellia asterella was originally endemic to all of the central European grasslands. They were particularly found in Norway, Great Britain, France, Germany, Switzerland, and Northern Italy. When they were extant in Great Britain, they resided in the Breckland and Sussex Coast.

Today, they can only be found in select areas of Norway and Germany. The majority of its observations today are in the German lowlands. They are typically found at lower elevations under 900m, and in isolated dry grasslands. This lichen can be found growing on dry, basic soils like limestone, dolomite, or gypsum

== Ecology ==
Buellia asterella is found on the ground of soils in Europe, making grasses and shrubs their main competitor. It is believed that this competition and encroachment by the grasses and shrubs have contributed to their threatened population in their endemic ranges. It is also frequently grazed by rabbits, sheep, and goats that are native to its range. It is also grazed by human-introduced livestock, which also contributed to its endangered status

== Conservation ==
Buellia asterella was listed as critically endangered on June 29, 2015 by the IUCN. The main causes of the critically endangered status is the loss of habitat to farming and urbanization, expansion of shrub and grasslands, and trampling of suitable habitat. It is also currently red listed in numerous European countries such as Germany and France (labeled as Critically Endangered), United Kingdom and Switzerland (labeled as Extinct).

Buellia asterella can currently be found in protected lands in Germany, as these protected lands are critical for the preservation of this species. It is known that this species is particularly sensitive to human induced habitat change and habitat destruction.

There has been some research into transplanting these lichens into areas they once inhabited. While these transplants have survived, they have not expanded beyond the original transplant area

== See also ==
- List of Buellia species
