= Buellia kantvilasii =

Conservation status
- Naturally Uncommon (NZ TCS)

Scientific classification
- Kingdom: Fungi
- Division: Ascomycota
- Class: Lecanoromycetes
- Order: Caliciales
- Family: Caliciaceae
- Genus: Buellia
- Species: B. kantvilasii

Binomial name
- Buellia kantvilasii Elix, Blanchon & A.Knight

Species of fungi

Buellia kantvilasii is a species of lichen in the family Caliciaceae. Found on coastal rocks in New Zealand and eastern Tasmania, it was first described in 2017 by John Alan Elix, Dan Blanchon and Allison Knight.

== Description ==
Buellia kantvilasii has a crustose thallus, and an upper surface that is shiny and coloured white, grey-white or pale grey. The species can be distinguished from Buellia albula due to the presence of immersed apothecia, discs that range from weakly concave, an inspersed subhymenium and by living on a substrate of siliceous rock.

== Taxonomy ==
The species was first described in 2017 by John Alan Elix, Dan Blanchon and Allison Knight. It was named after Gintaras Kantvilas, an Australian lichenologist who collected the type specimen.

== Distribution and habitat ==
The species is found on coastal rocks in Queensland, eastern Tasmania and New Zealand.
