= Buellia phillipensis =

Scientific classification
- Kingdom: Fungi
- Division: Ascomycota
- Class: Lecanoromycetes
- Order: Caliciales
- Family: Caliciaceae
- Genus: Buellia
- Species: B. phillipensis

Binomial name
- Buellia phillipensis Elix (2020)
- Holotype site: Phillip Island (Norfolk Island)

Species of lichen

Buellia phillipensis is a little-known species of saxicolous (rock-dwelling), crustose lichen in the family Caliciaceae, described in 2020. It is only known to occur on Phillip Island in the Southwest Pacific.

== Taxonomy ==
Buellia phillipensis was formally described as a new species by the Australian lichenologist John Elix in 2020. It is named after its type locality on Phillip Island, which is one of three islands that collectively form the Territory of Norfolk Island.

== Description ==
The thallus of Buellia phillipensis is crustose and has a rimose to rimose-areolate texture, spreading up to 15 mm wide. The areoles are crowded, measuring 0.3–1 mm wide, irregular, angular, and flat. The upper surface is white, shiny, with a prominent black prothallus at the margins. The medulla is white, does not contain calcium oxalate, and the photobiont cells measure 10–16 μm in diameter. The apothecia are small, 0.1–0.4 mm wide, initially lecanorine then changing to biatorine or lecideine, and separate or grouped. The thalline margin of the apothecia ultimately becomes excluded with age. The disc is black, non-powdery (epruinose), and either weakly concave or flat. The proper exciple is thin, persistent, and black, with an outer zone that is aeruginose-black, 25–30 μm thick. The epihymenium is dark brown to aeruginose, while the hypothecium beneath is brown to deep brown and 50–86 μm thick. The hymenium is 50–60 μm thick, colorless, and the subhymenium beneath it is pale brown, 10–15 μm thick. Paraphyses are 1.5–2 μm wide, sparsely branched, with dark brown capped tips. The asci are of the Bacidia type, containing eight spores. The ascospores are Buellia-type, brown, ellipsoid, measuring 9–13 by 5–8 μm, and the outer spore-wall is microrugulate. The pycnidia are brown to black, immersed, with bacilliform conidia measuring 4–5 by 0.7–1 μm. Chemically, the medulla contains no lichen substances.

Buellia phillipensis shares similarities with Buellia cranwelliae, but is distinguished by having cryptolecanorine apothecia and the absence of calcium oxalate in the medulla.

== Distribution and ecology ==
Known only from its type locality, Buellia phillipensis was collected from a rock outcrop in a valley dominated by African olive trees. Associated lichen species in the habitat include Diploschistes actinostomus, Lecidella enteroleucella, Lecidella granulosula, Parmotrema tinctorum, Pertusaria xanthoplaca, Rinodina luridata, and Rinodina oxydata.
