= Buellia bahiana =

Scientific classification
- Domain: Eukaryota
- Kingdom: Fungi
- Division: Ascomycota
- Class: Lecanoromycetes
- Order: Caliciales
- Family: Caliciaceae
- Genus: Buellia
- Species: B. bahiana

Binomial name
- Buellia bahiana Malme

Synonyms
- Hafellia bahiana (Malme) Sheard, 1992

Species of fungus

Buellia bahiana (commonly known as bay buttons) is a crustose-type lichen species that frequently grows on the bark and wood of trees found in coastal and inland forest habitats. This lichen species exhibits a broad geographic distribution, being documented in various pantropical and subtropical regions around the world. Specific areas where Buellia bahiana has been recorded include parts of Australia, Africa, North America, Central America, South America, and several Pacific Island chains.

== Description ==
Buellia bahiana has a thin, continuous thallus that can range in texture from membranous to areolate. The thallus color varies from white to grey-white or pale grey. A prothallus, the dark border around the thallus, is typically only evident when the lichen is growing adjacent to other species.

The lichen produces abundant, sessile apothecia that are 0.1-0.7 mm wide. These apothecia have a black, epruinose (lacking a waxy bloom) disc that is plane to slightly convex in shape. The margin of the apothecia is also black and persistent. Microscopically, the proper exciple, the layer beneath the disc, is dark brown to brown, black, but paler internally.

The epihymenium, the uppermost layer of the hymenium, is 10-15 μm thick and ranges in color from olive to blue-green or dark olive-green. This layer turns violet when exposed to potassium hydroxide (K+ violet). The hymenium, the spore-bearing layer, is 65-85 μm thick and contains numerous oil droplets dispersed throughout. The hypothecium, the layer beneath the hymenium, is 35-80 μm thick and dark brown in color.

The asci, the spore-producing structures, contain 8 ascospores each. The ascospores are 1-septate, meaning they have a single wall dividing them, and measure 13-20 μm long by 5.5-8.0 μm wide. They are often slightly elongated at the ends and have distinct thickenings of the subapical and septum regions of the spore wall. The outer wall of the ascospores is smooth. Pycnidia, the structures that produce asexual spores, have not been observed on this species.

== Chemistry ==
Chemical analysis via spot test shows that the thallus of Buellia bahiana tests positive for two substances. It reacts K+ red, indicating the presence of norstictic acid as a major component. The thallus also tests P+ yellow or yellow orange, revealing the minor or trace compound connorstictic acid.

== Habitat and distribution ==
Buellia bahiana is commonly found growing on the bark and wood of trees in coastal and hinterland forests in several regions of Australia, including Western Australia, Queensland, and Tasmania. This lichen species has a broader pantropical to subtropical distribution.

Beyond its distribution in Australia, this lichen species is also known to occur in various locations across the Pacific region, Central America, North America, and South America. Specific areas where Buellia bahiana has been documented include Tahiti, Hawaiian Islands, and the New Caledonia.

== Conservation status ==
In the U.S. state of Georgia, Buellia bahiana is considered a rare species, reported from swamps and bottomland forests. However, its overall conservation status in other parts of its range is generally unknown.

Under the Nature Conservation Act 1992 in the state of Queensland, Australia, the conservation status of this lichen species is listed as "Least Concern". (Note: NCA Status Code: C=Least concern wildlife)
