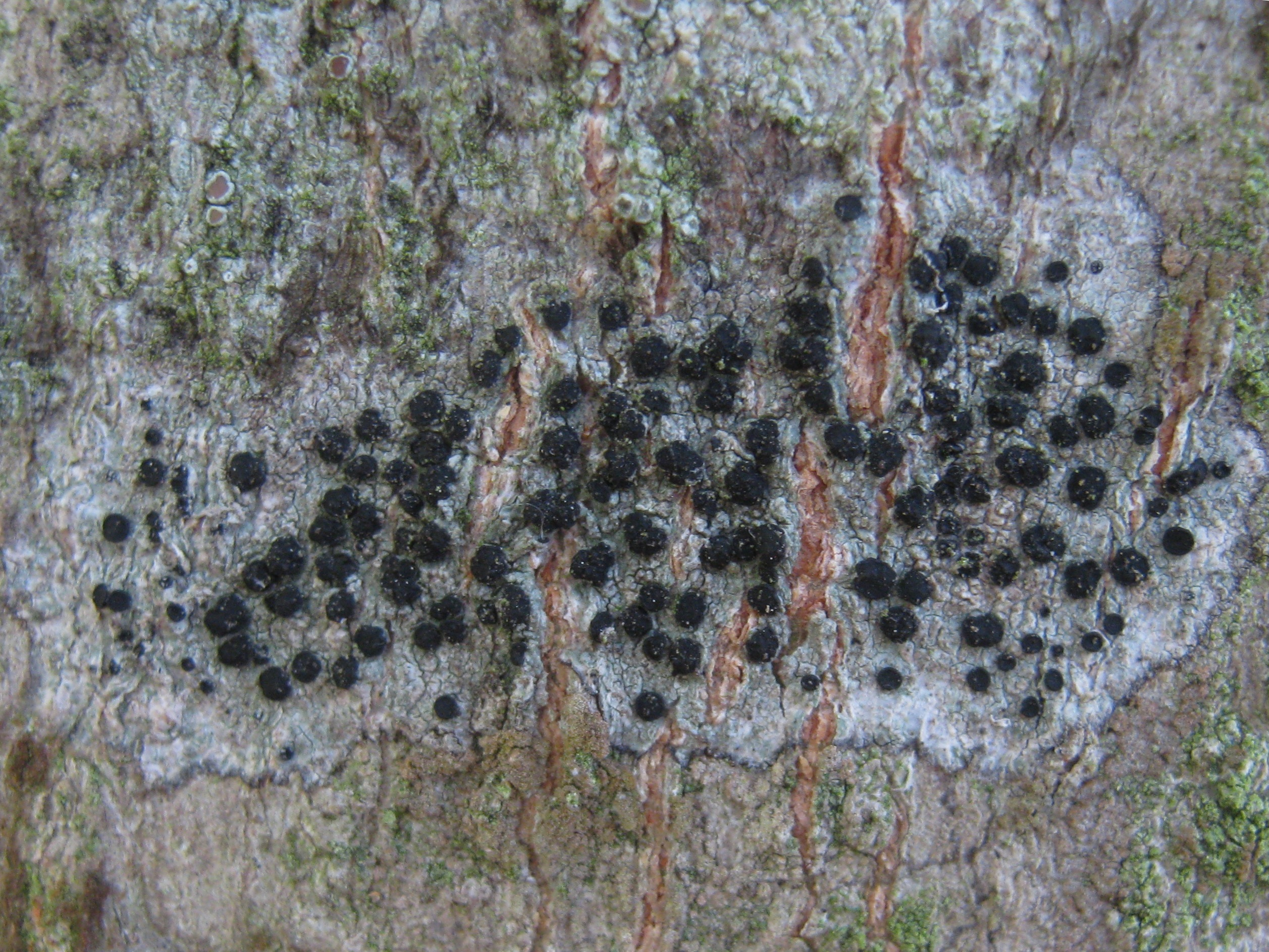

Scientific classification
- Kingdom: Fungi
- Division: Ascomycota
- Class: Lecanoromycetes
- Order: Caliciales
- Family: Caliciaceae
- Genus: Buellia
- Species: B. arborea

Binomial name
- Buellia arborea Coppins & Tønsberg (1992)

= Buellia arborea =

Species of lichen

Buellia arborea is a species of crustose lichen in the family Caliciaceae. It is found in Northern Europe and western North America.

== Description ==
B. arborea is crustose, whitish in colour and forming up to 4 cm wide patches.
