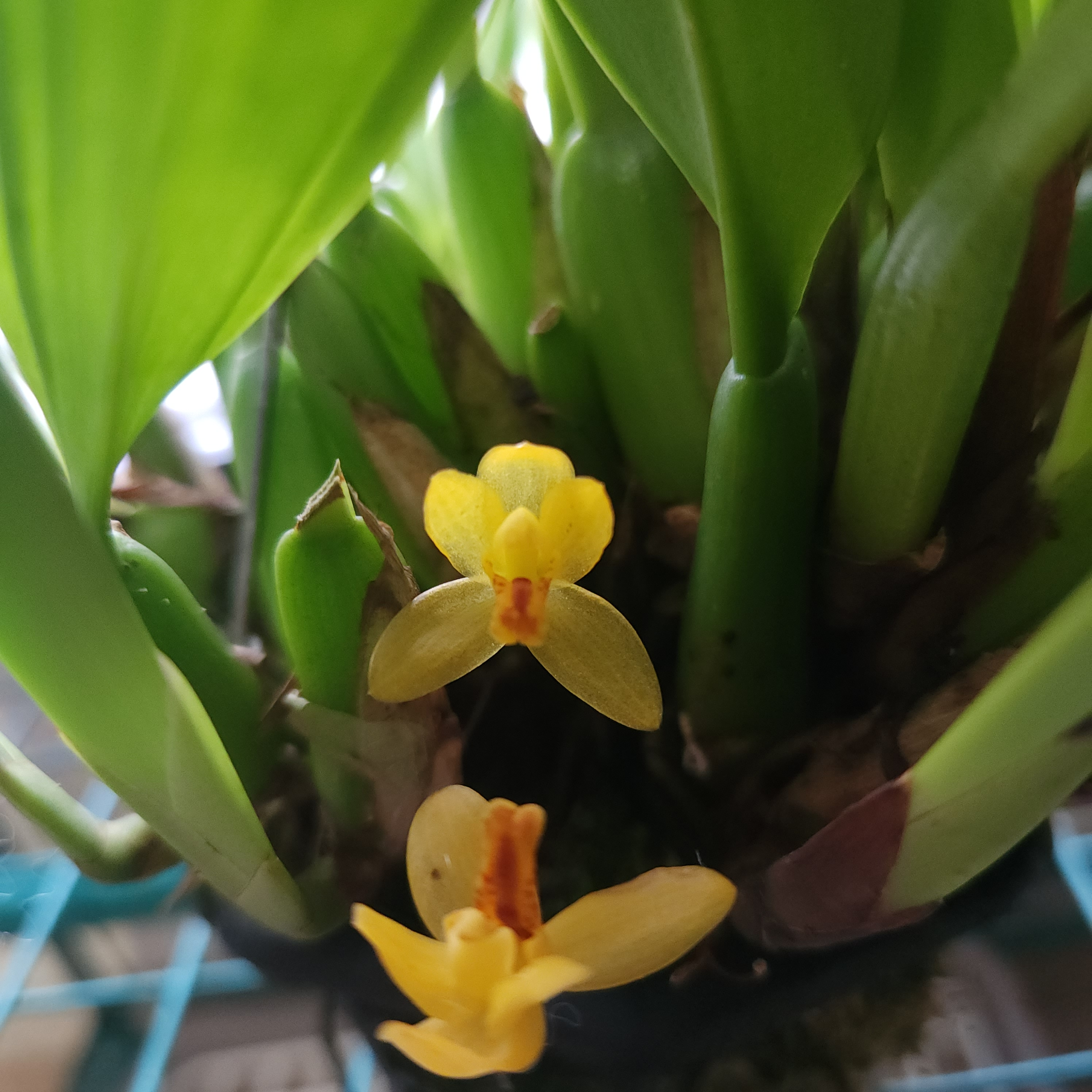

Conservation status
- CITES Appendix II (CITES)

Scientific classification
- Kingdom: Plantae
- Clade: Tracheophytes
- Clade: Angiosperms
- Clade: Monocots
- Order: Asparagales
- Family: Orchidaceae
- Subfamily: Epidendroideae
- Genus: Maxillaria
- Species: M. aureoglobula

Binomial name
- Maxillaria aureoglobula Christenson, 2002
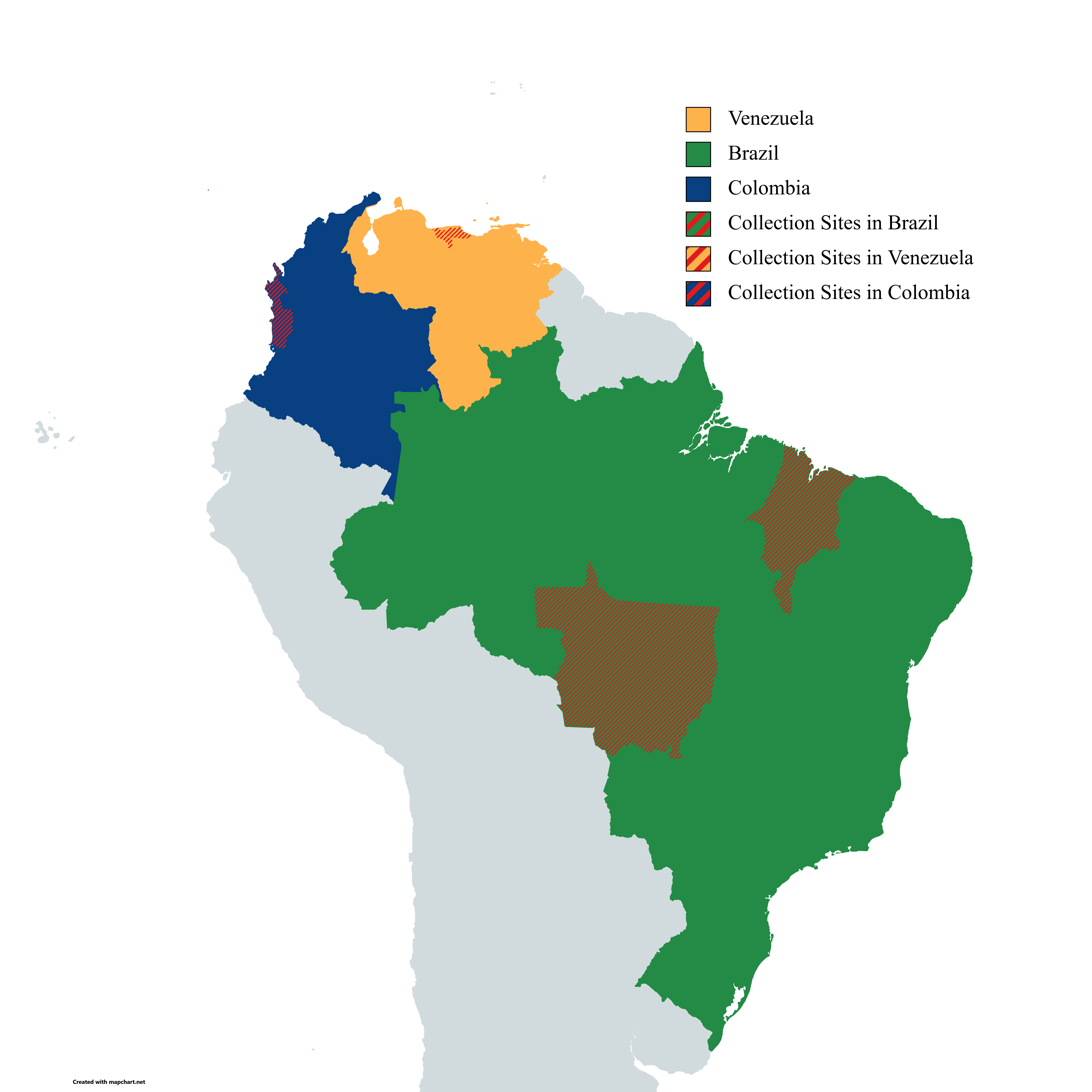

Synonyms
- Mormolyca aureoglobula; Xanthoxerampellia aureoglobula; Mormolyca fumea; Maxillaria fumea

= Maxillaria aureoglobula =

Species of orchid

Maxillaria aureoglobula, the golden globe maxillaria, is a species of epiphytic orchid native to Costa Rica, Colombia, Venezuela, and Brazil. Originally this species was included in the species Maxillaria rufescens but in 2002 it was described a distinct species by Eric Christenson. The type specimen was collected in Columbia although the precise location is unknown.

== Etymology ==
The species epithet aureoglobuala is a combination of the Latin words aureus (golden) and globus (globe) referring to the yellow spherically shaped flowers.

== Distribution ==
The distribution of Maxillaria aureoglobula is not well known due to its relatively recent classification. What is known is from the seven collected plants documented in literature. In Brazil three plants have been reported, one in the state of Maranhão and two in the state Mato Grosso. Two plants in Venezuela were incorrectly documented as Maxillaria rufescens by Dunsterville and Gray in 1961 one plant in the Municipality of Maracay in the state of Aragua the other was found in Municipality of Guatopo in the state of Miranda. The type specimen was a plant in cultivation with an unknown locality in Colombia. In 2016 Sauleda reported on a specimen that was found in the municipality of Darién in the state of Chohó. This plant gave a documented locality in Colombia.

== Characteristics ==
This species grows epiphyticaly with its rhizome attached completely to its phorophyte. It has elongated compressed pseudobulbs topped with a single long leaf that is about 8 in (200 mm) long.

In its native range in Brazil flowering occurs from February to April. The .75 in (19 mm) flowers are held close to the base of the plant on single flowered inflorescences emerging from the rhizome between pseudobulbs. The flowers have yellow sepals and petals, and the labellum is covered with red spots. The scent is reported to be faintly of melon rind.

== Cultivation ==
Maxillaria aureoglobula like most orchids in its genus is rare in cultivation typically only kept in specialty collection. In cultivation plants can be grown in pots or in a similar fashion to how they grow in nature mounted on pieces of wood or cork.

== Associated phorophytes ==
This species has been found associated with the following phorophytes:

- Lecythis pisonis

== Similar species ==
Maxillaria aureoglobula is often confused with the following species:

- Maxillaria acutifolia
- Maxillaria alba
- Maxillaria chacoensis
- Maxillaria cleistogama
- Maxillaria moralesii
- Maxillaria rufescens
- Maxillaria suarezorum
