= Trebouxia decolorans =

Scientific classification
- Kingdom: Plantae
- Division: Chlorophyta
- Class: Trebouxiophyceae
- Order: Trebouxiales
- Family: Trebouxiaceae
- Genus: Trebouxia
- Species: T. decolorans

Binomial name
- Trebouxia decolorans Ahmadjian, 1960

Synonyms
- Trebouxia albulescens Giudeci de Nicola & Di Benedetto, 1962; Pseudotrebouxia decolorans (Ahmadjian) P.A.Archibald, 1975

Species of green alga

Trebouxia decolorans is a widespread and common symbiotic species of green alga that is found in association with different species of lichen-forming fungi. Some lichens in which it is the photobiont partner are Xanthoria parietina and Anaptychia ciliaris.

== Taxonomy ==
The alga was described as a new species in 1960 by lichenologist Vernon Ahmadjian. He collected the type specimens from lichens collected on bark from West Boylston, and on stone from Middleborough (both locations in Massachusetts). The same algal species was later isolated from fruticose Xanthoria parietina and the crustose Amandinea punctata. The species epithet decolorans refers of the tendency of the alga to lose color when exposed to light. A set of microsatellite markers has been developed for use in high-resolution population studies of this common photobiont.

== Description ==
The typical vegetative cells of Trebouxia decolorans are mostly spherical, although older cells can take on an ellipsoidal or irregular shape. These mature cells generally range from 19.0 by 19.0 μm to 25.5 by 25.5 μm in size, with some reaching up to 30 μm in diameter. Notably, individual cells of this species do not possess a distinct gelatinous sheath. The internal structure, or chromatophore, remains fairly smooth without deep indentations. Moreover, during cell division, the chromatophore does not move to a wall-adjacent position.

When grown in liquid cultures, the cells tend to form small, irregular clusters, primarily because the aplanospores, a type of spore, do not readily separate. These sporangia often contain between 8 and 16 aplanospores. Additionally, in some instances, zoospores do not fully cleave. When grown in complete darkness within an organic nutrient agar medium, two-month-old colonies display a dark blackish-green hue and possess a somewhat granular texture.

Ahmadjian noted that the algal specimens from both Amandinea punctata and Xanthoria parietina were identical both morphologically and physiologically. A unique feature of this alga is its tendency to lose color when exposed to direct light, regardless of whether the source is natural or artificial, and irrespective of the type of growth medium. However, this color loss is not attributed to heat effects, as samples grown in the absence of light maintain their color. The alga appears to thrive better in growth media where peptone serves as the nitrogen source. Given that both lichens housing this alga have a thickly pigmented upper cortex that likely diminishes light intensity, it has suggested that under such conditions, the alga might be partially saprophytic.

== Distribution ==
Trebouxia decolorans has a widespread distribution. It has been documented as the photobiont for Ramalina menziesii in California, Xanthoria parietina in Europe, and Gallowayella hasseana in western North America. Other known lichen associations include Candelaria concolor, Massjukiella tenax, Physcia adscenden, Ramalina farinacea, R. menziesii, and R. leptocarpha.
