= Amandinea myrticola =

Scientific classification
- Kingdom: Fungi
- Division: Ascomycota
- Class: Lecanoromycetes
- Order: Caliciales
- Family: Caliciaceae
- Genus: Amandinea
- Species: A. myrticola

Binomial name
- Amandinea myrticola Giralt, van den Boom & Elix (2011)
- Holotype: Barragem de Odivelas, Portugal

Species of lichen

Amandinea myrticola is a species of corticolous (bark-dwelling), crustose lichen in the family Caliciaceae. Found in Portugal, It grows on the smooth bark of Myrtus communis and Pinus twigs.

== Taxonomy ==
It was formally described as a new species in 2011 by Mireia Giralt, Pieter van den Boom, and John Elix. The type specimen was collected by van den Boom from the south side of Barragem de Odivelas (Alentejo) at an elevation of 100 m; the specimen was found growing on Myrtus communis.

== Description ==
Amandinea myrticola has a very thin, grey thallus (25–50 μm thick) that grows on tree bark (corticolous) and covers large areas with a smooth to slightly rough surface. The lichen lacks a visible boundary structure (prothallus) and contains green algal cells (chlorococcoid photobionts) up to 25 μm in diameter as its photosynthetic partner. The thallus does not react with iodine (non-amyloid) and contains no calcium oxalate crystals.

The reproductive structures (apothecia) of A. myrticola initially appear to have a rim of thallus tissue (lecanorine) but develop into structures lacking this feature (lecideine). These dark brown to blackish, flat to convex discs measure 0.1–0.3 mm in diameter and sit directly on or slightly raised above the thallus. The proper margin is thin and not persistent, with a poorly developed excipulum (the structural layer surrounding the spore-producing tissue). The spore-producing layer (hymenium) is colourless and 50–60 μm high, while the layer beneath it (hypothecium) is dark brown and 30–70 μm deep.

The spore sacs (asci) of A. μmmyrticola each contain eight spores of the Physconia-type, measuring about 12.4 by 5.6 μm. These ellipsoid spores are straight or slightly curved with distinctive developmental stages: beginning as colourless with median wall thickenings, progressing to lightly pigmented with a thick septum (dividing partition) and pronounced thickenings forming an hourglass-shaped internal structure, and finally maturing with a thinner septum and less pronounced wall features. The lichen also produces small reproductive structures called pycnidia (0.01–0.02 mm in diameter) that release filiform, mostly strongly curved conidia measuring around 20 by 1 μm.

The lichen does not make any secondary compounds that are detectable with standard chromatographic techniques, and all reactions to standard chemical spot tests are negative.

== Habitat and distribution ==
Amandinea myrticola is known from only two localities, both situated in the Alentejo region of Portugal. This lichen species demonstrates specific substrate preferences, growing on the smooth bark of Myrtus communis (myrtle) twigs and Pinus species (pine) branches.

In its limited known habitat, A. myrticola is accompanied by several pioneer, acidophilous lichen species that prefer acidic substrates. These companion species include Amandinea punctata in the broad sense, and Rinodina freyi. The ecological community in these localities is diverse, with different lichen assemblages occurring on various host plants (phorophytes). On Quercus ilex (holm oak) in the same area, species such as Caloplaca cf. pyracea, Caloplaca obscurella, Parmotrema reticulatum, Rinodina capensis, and Waynea stoechadiana can be found. Meanwhile, Cistus ladanifer (gum rockrose) in the vicinity hosts Flavoparmelia soredians, Lecanora albella, Lecanora expallens, and Parmotrema hypoleucinum.
