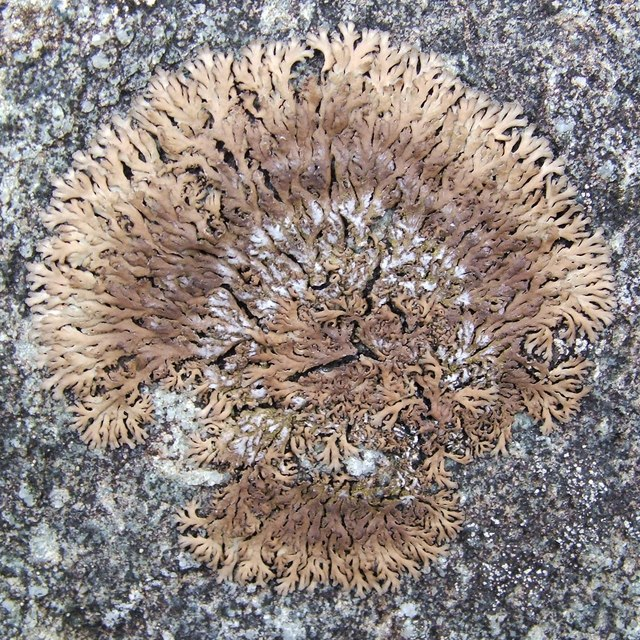

Scientific classification
- Domain: Eukaryota
- Kingdom: Fungi
- Division: Ascomycota
- Class: Lecanoromycetes
- Order: Caliciales
- Family: Physciaceae
- Genus: Anaptychia
- Species: A. runcinata

Binomial name
- Anaptychia runcinata (With.) J.R.Laundon

= Anaptychia runcinata =

Species of fungus

Anaptychia runcinata is a species of fungus belonging to the family Physciaceae.

It is native to Europe and Northern America.
