= Amandinea devilliersiana =

Scientific classification
- Kingdom: Fungi
- Division: Ascomycota
- Class: Lecanoromycetes
- Order: Caliciales
- Family: Caliciaceae
- Genus: Amandinea
- Species: A. devilliersiana

Binomial name
- Amandinea devilliersiana Elix & Kantvilas (2013)

Species of lichen

Amandinea devilliersiana is a crustose lichen in the family Caliciaceae. It occurs on salt-sprayed granite and quartzite along the coasts of South Australia, Western Australia, and Tasmania, where its grey, fissured thallus is dotted with inconspicuous black fruit bodies. This coastal specialist can be identified by its distinctive red reaction when tested with potassium hydroxide solution and its production of norstictic acid. The lichen shares its harsh maritime habitat with other salt-tolerant species, preferring slightly sheltered rock faces and overhangs where seawater mist provides intermittent moisture.

== Taxonomy ==
The species was described in 2013 by the Australian lichenologists John A. Elix and Gintaras Kantvilas from material collected on granite boulders at Windmill Bay, eastern Kangaroo Island (type locality 1 m above sea level). The epithet honours Brigitte de Villiers, a long-standing field companion of Kantvilas.

Morphologically A. devilliersiana most closely resembles the Antarctic species Amandinea latemarginata, from which it differs in having smaller ascospores (10–15 × 5–8 μm vs 12–18 × 7–10 μm), longer thread-like conidia (15–30 μm) and, critically, a thallus whose rim does not break into radiating lobes (an 'effigurate' margin). The new species also recalls the widespread Amandinea pelidna, but that lichen lacks secondary metabolites and usually develops a thicker internal layer beneath the hymenium. Thin-layer chromatography shows A. devilliersiana contains norstictic acid as its principal lichen product, with a trace of connorstictic acid.

== Description ==
The lichen forms continuous to cracked patches (0.5–6 cm across) whose surface ranges from smooth to warted. Each individual areole—tiny polygonal plate—measures 0.2–0.4 mm and rises slightly above the rock. A thin black line of fungal tissue (the prothallus) often outlines the colony. Internally, the upper 'skin' (cortex) is only 12–15 μm thick, while the lower medulla is colourless and lacks the calcium oxalate crystals common in many shore lichens.

Minute, black apothecia (fruiting bodies) provide the lichen's sexual reproduction. They are disc-shaped, sit directly on the thallus, and span 0.3–0.8 mm. The surrounding ring of tissue (proper exciple) stays visible even in older specimens and shows a vivid red reaction when a drop of potassium hydroxide solution is applied—a quick chemical test used in the field. Inside, the hymenium is clear and free of oil droplets. Eight spores develop in each ascus; they begin with thickened inner walls typical of the Physconia-type but mature into the more angular Buellia-type. Fully grown spores are olive-brown, one-septate and not pinched at the partition. Immersed pycnidia produce curved, hair-like conidia up to 30 μm long that provide an asexual means of dispersal.

== Habitat and distribution ==
Amandinea devilliersiana is a littoral specialist recorded from northern and western Tasmania, the eastern shore of Kangaroo Island, and Recherche Archipelago in Western Australia. It colonises hard, crystalline rocks—granite, quartzite and dolerite—in the splash zone a few metres above high tide. The lichen shares this niche with other salt-tolerant crusts such as Caloplaca cribrosa, Rinodina blastidiata and Xanthoria ligulata. Within these wind-exposed sites it prefers slightly sheltered faces and overhangs where seawater mist maintains intermittent moisture, yet direct freshwater runoff is minimal.
