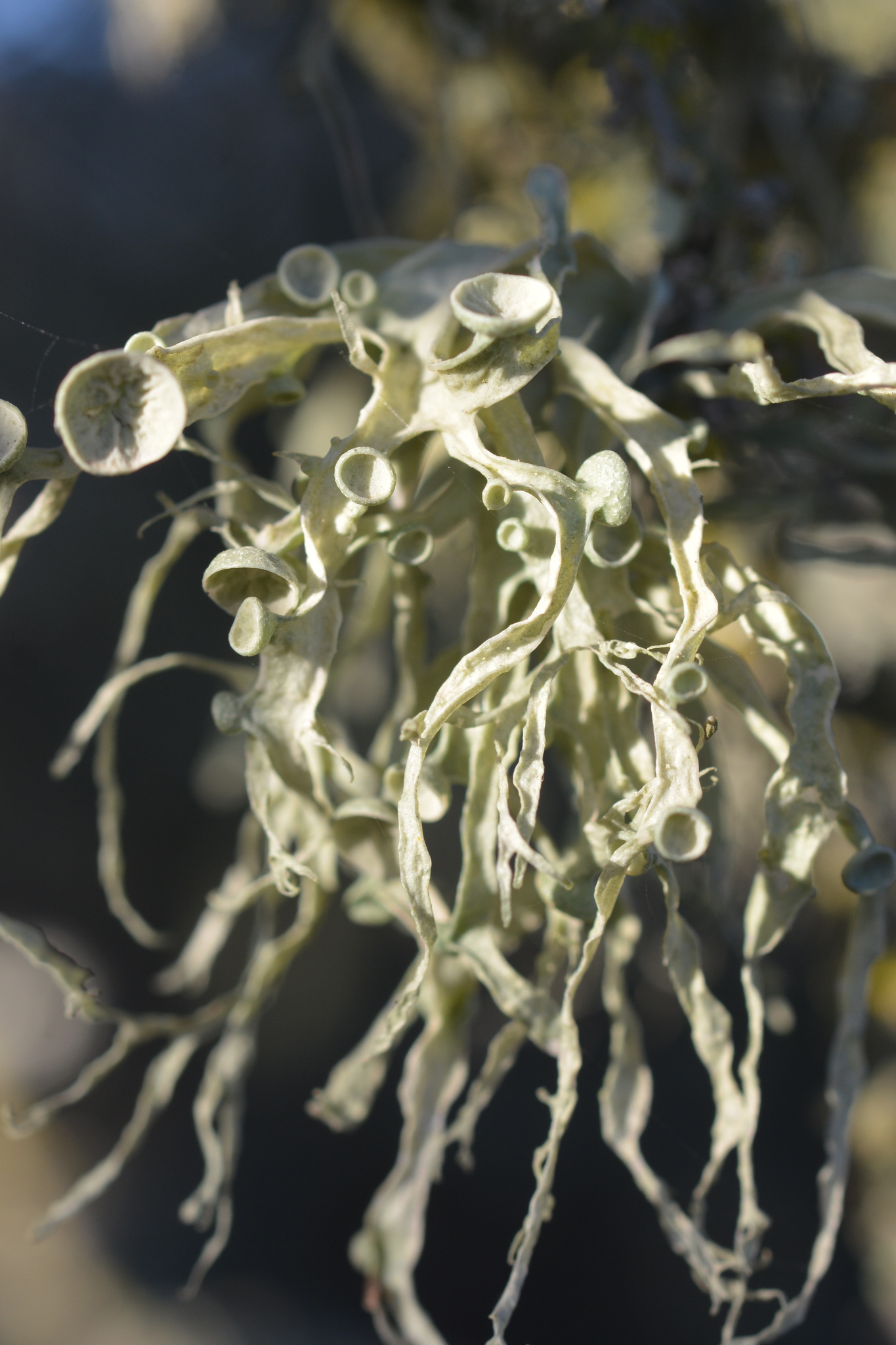
- Edgewood Park & Natural Preserve, San Mateo County, California, 2021

Conservation status
- Vulnerable (NatureServe)

Scientific classification
- Kingdom: Fungi
- Division: Ascomycota
- Class: Lecanoromycetes
- Order: Lecanorales
- Family: Ramalinaceae
- Genus: Ramalina
- Species: R. leptocarpha

Binomial name
- Ramalina leptocarpha Tuck., 1858

= Ramalina leptocarpha =

Species of lichen

Ramalina leptocarpha, also known as the western strap lichen, is a species of cartilage lichen found in Oregon, California, and Baja California. The range of this species extends from the coast as far inland as the Sierra Nevada mountain range. R. leptocarpha often grows in epiphytic association with Ramalina menziesii. Trebouxia decolorans is its primary algal photobiont. This species was first described in 1858 by Edward Tuckerman from a collection made in Monterey, California.
