= Amandinea conglomerata =

Scientific classification
- Kingdom: Fungi
- Division: Ascomycota
- Class: Lecanoromycetes
- Order: Caliciales
- Family: Caliciaceae
- Genus: Amandinea
- Species: A. conglomerata

Binomial name
- Amandinea conglomerata Elix & Kantvilas (2013)
- Holotype: Bristol Point, Jervis Bay Territory, Australia

Species of lichen

Amandinea conglomerata is a species of crustose lichen in the family Caliciaceae. and found in New South Wales. It is confined to wave-washed sandstone and andesite outcrops along the south-eastern coast of Australia, where its minute black fruit bodies form tight clusters that help to distinguish it from superficially similar species. This maritime specialist grows on hard rock surfaces that are regularly splashed by seawater but dry between tides, sharing its habitat with other salt-tolerant lichens. The species can be distinguished from similar lichens by its oil-filled spore layer and the way its fruiting bodies merge together into cushion-like clusters as they age.

== Taxonomy ==
The species was described in 2013 by the Australian lichenologists John Elix and Gintaras Kantvilas during a revision of the buellioid lichens of coastal New South Wales and the adjacent Jervis Bay Territory. The holotype, collected at Bristol Point on the Beecroft Peninsula at an elevation of just 1 metre, comprises a thin, partly immersed thallus on wave-exposed rocks. Elix and Kantvilas coined the epithet conglomerata ('crowded together') to reflect the tendency of old apothecia to coalesce into cushion-like agglomerations.

Although chemical spot tests reveal either no lichen products or, rarely, traces of norstictic acid, morphology and spore anatomy set the taxon apart from its closest look-alike, Amandinea pelidna. Later work confirmed that the species also differs sharply from the coastal taxon Amandinea variabilis in having an inspersed hymenium, numerous sessile apothecia that become convex-to-tuberculate with age, and markedly smaller, often septum-constricted Buellia-type ascospores. In A. conglomerata the one-septate spores are slightly narrower (5–7 μm wide), initially of the Pachysporaria-type and only later assuming the Buellia-type outline, and they are usually pinched at the internal wall; in addition, the hymenium is heavily suffused with oil droplets, a feature virtually absent from A. pelidna. Another lookalike is A. brussei, but this South African lichen differs in lacking calcium oxalate in the medulla, and it has longer ascospores measuring 13–18 μm long.

== Description ==
The thallus is crustose, forming inconspicuous patches up to about 10 cm across. Most of the lichen grows endolithically, that is, within the upper millimetre of the rock, so in the field it appears as scattered, chalk-white flecks 0.2–0.5 mm wide. No dark boundary (prothallus) surrounds the colony, and the photosynthetic partner consists of spherical green-algal cells 8–15 μm in diameter entwined by colourless fungal threads.

Black, disk-shaped fruit bodies (apothecia) are abundant. They sit directly on the rock (sessile), measure 0.2–0.7 mm across, and start out rounded with a weakly concave centre. As they age the discs flatten, then become convex and finally tuberculate, pressing against one another until up to ten satellites merge into a single cluster as wide as 1.2 mm. Each apothecium retains a distinct excipulum—a ring of dark-pigmented tissue—which in section is 60–100 μm thick and grades from deep red-brown at the outer edge to paler reddish tones inward.

Microscopically the upper hymenium forms a dark olive epihymenium 12–20 μm thick above a colourless hymenium 60–100 μm tall that is densely inspersed, or laced, with minute oil droplets. Slender, occasionally branched paraphyses enlarge to brown-tipped clubs 3–4 μm wide. Eight ascospores develop in each Bacidia-type ascus. When first formed the spores match the Pachysporaria pattern—thick-walled with a narrow septum—but they mature into Buellia-type spores that are ellipsoid, 10–17 μm long by 5–7 μm wide, and show a faint ornamentation on the outer wall. Pycnidia (asexual reproductive structures) are visible as tiny black pimples; they produce curved, thread-like conidia 15–23 μm long and less than 1 μm thick.

== Habitat and distribution ==
Amandinea conglomerata is a maritime specialist recorded from three coastal sites between Kioloa in southern New South Wales and the Jervis Bay Territory, all within a few metres of the high-tide mark. The lichen colonises hard siliceous rock surfaces that are routinely splashed by seawater but dry between tides, an environment shared with other salt-tolerant crusts such as Buellia aeruginosa, Caloplaca cribrosa and Xanthoria ligulata. Its patchy thallus provides little protection against desiccation, so the species is restricted to shaded faces and fissures where moisture persists.
