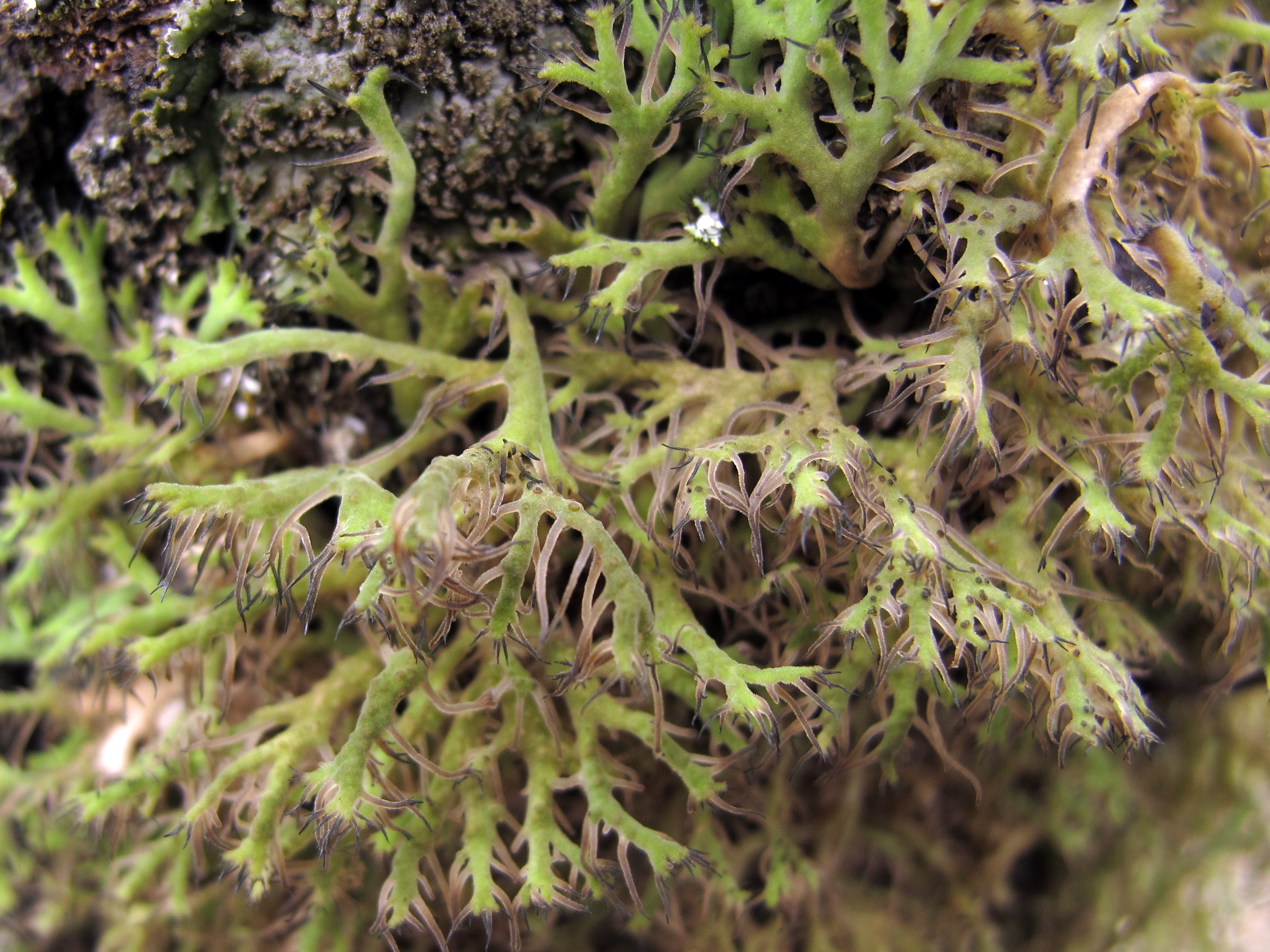

Scientific classification
- Kingdom: Fungi
- Division: Ascomycota
- Class: Lecanoromycetes
- Order: Caliciales
- Family: Physciaceae
- Genus: Anaptychia
- Species: A. ciliaris

Binomial name
- Anaptychia ciliaris (L.) Flot. (1850)

Synonyms
- List: Lichen ciliaris L. (1753); Lichenoides ciliaris (L.) Hoffm. [as 'ciliare'] (1789); Lobaria ciliaris (L.) Hoffm. (1796); Parmelia ciliaris (L.) Ach. (1803); Parmelia ciliaris var. melanosticta Ach. (1803); Physcia ciliaris (L.) DC. (1805); Platyphyllum ciliare L.) J.St.-Hil. (1805); Borrera ciliaris (L.) Ach. (1810); Borrera ciliaris var. melanosticta (Ach.) Ach. (1810); Platisma ciliare (L.) Frege (1812); Borrera melanosticta (Ach.) Röhl. (1813); Hagenia ciliaris (L.) W.Mann (1825); Physcia obscura var. ciliaris (L.) Fürnr. (1839); Parmelia mamillata Taylor (1847); Dimelaena ciliaris (L.) Norman (1852); Physcia ciliaris var. saxicola Nyl. (1860); Borrera ciliaris var. saxicola (Nyl.) Mudd (1861); Physcia ciliaris var. melanosticta (Ach.) Grognot (1863); Physcia ciliaris f. melanosticta (Ach.) Th.Fr. (1871); Physcia ciliaris f. saxicola (Nyl.) Th.Fr. (1871); Anaptychia ciliaris h saxicola (Nyl.) Arnold (1884); Anaptychia ciliaris f. melanosticta (Ach.) Boberski (1886); Parmelia ciliaris var. saxicola (Nyl.) Jatta (1889); Xanthoria ciliaris (L.) Horw. (1912); Xanthoria ciliaris var. saxicola (Nyl.) Horw. (1912); Anaptychia ciliaris f. saxicola (Nyl.) B.de Lesd. (1924); Anaptychia ciliaris subsp. melanosticta (Ach.) Lynge (1935); Anaptychia ciliaris var. melanosticta (Ach.) Boistel (1903); Anaptychia ciliaris var. saxicola (Nyl.) Pit. & Harm. (1911); Cyphelium inquinans f. saxicola (Nyl.) Vain. (1926); Anaptychia melanosticta (Ach.) Trass (1969); Anaptychia mamillata (Taylor) D.Hawksw. (1973); Anaptychia ciliaris subsp. mamillata (Taylor) D.Hawksw. & P.James (1980)

= Anaptychia ciliaris =

Species of lichen

Anaptychia ciliaris, commonly known as the great ciliated lichen or eagle's claws, is a species of fruticose lichen in the family Physciaceae. It is predominantly found in Northern Europe, with its range extending to European Russia, the Caucasus, Central and Southern Europe, the Canary Islands, and parts of Asia. First mentioned in botanical literature by the Italian botanist Fabio Colonna in 1606, the species was formally described by Carl Linnaeus in 1753, who highlighted its unique physical characteristics such as its grey colour, its unusual leafy form with linear fringe-like segments, and the presence of hair-like structures (cilia). This lichen is adaptable in its choice of substrates, mostly growing on tree barks and less commonly on rocks.

Throughout history, the lichen has been used in early scientific investigations about lichen structure and development. Early botanists like Joseph Pitton de Tournefort and Johann Hedwig made observations about the lichen's structure. More recent studies have investigated its potential biological activities, including antibacterial, insecticidal, and antioxidant properties. A. ciliaris has been used in research to monitor atmospheric pollution, including detecting air pollution following the Chernobyl disaster. Beyond its scientific importance, the lichen has had various practical applications. For example, in the 17th century, it was one of several lichen ingredients in "Cyprus Powder", used as a personal grooming and cosmetic product.

Anaptychia ciliaris is readily recognizable by its fruticose (bushy) thallus that varies in colour from greyish-white to brownish-grey, to greenish when wet, and its large and distinctive cilia. The lichen can form extensive colonies made of neighbouring lichens each attached to the substrate at a single point, all with narrow lobes, known as laciniae, growing outwards. These laciniae, which are covered in fine hairs, split repeatedly into equal branches. Circular reproductive structures (apothecia) with brown discs occur on the thallus surface. The internal anatomy of A. ciliaris makes it sensitive to air pollutants, leading to observable changes in its form when exposed to these conditions. Two species of green algae in the genus Trebouxia have been shown to serve as the photobionts (photosynthetic partners) of this lichen.

== Taxonomy ==
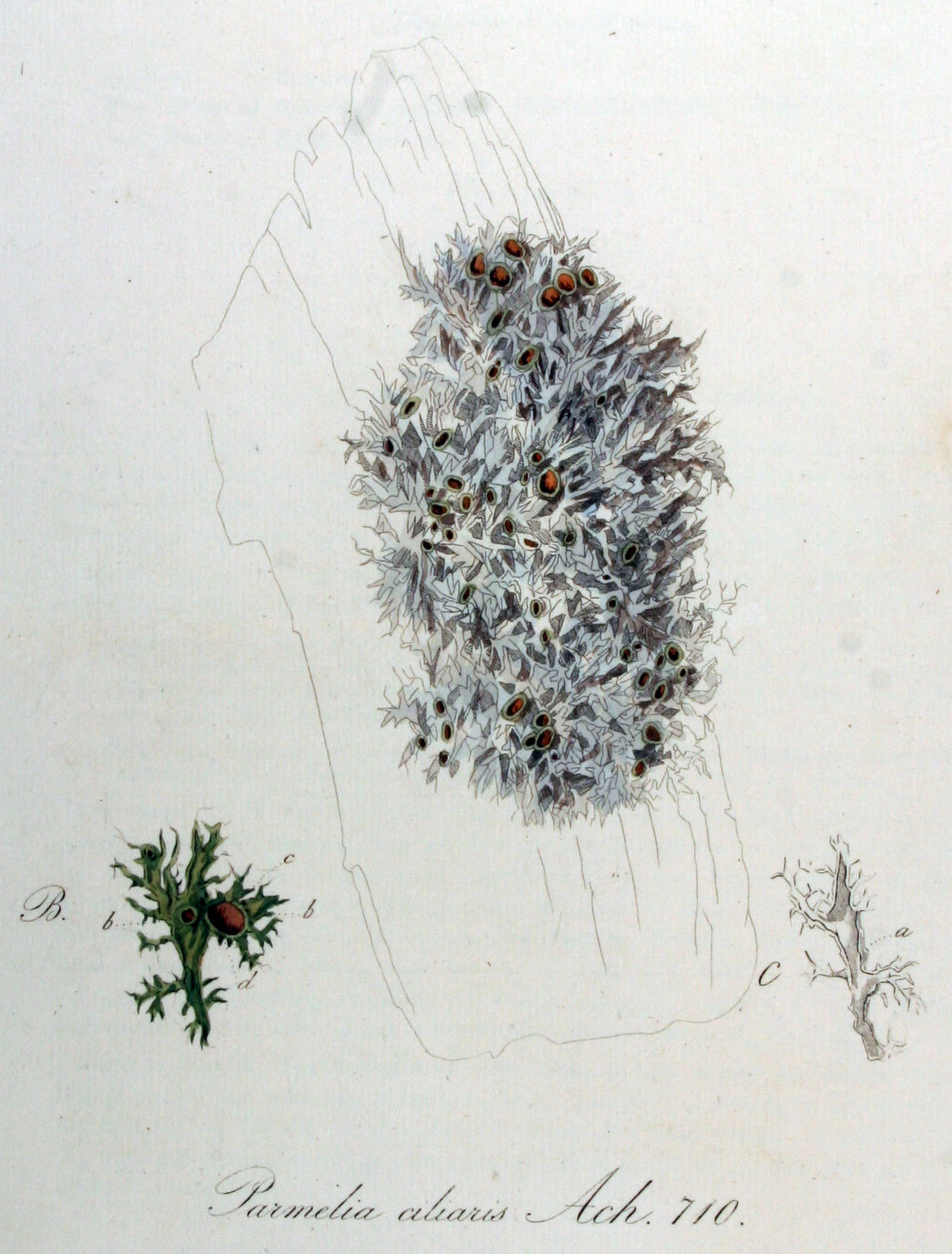
Illustration of "Parmelia ciliaris" by Dutch botanist Jan Kops in 1846

According to Annie Lorrain Smith, Anaptypia ciliaris was first mentioned in the botanical literature in 1606 by the Italian botanist Fabio Colonna in his Ekphrasis, a work known for its detailed illustrations of plants using copperplate engravings. It was formally described as a new species in 1753 by Carl Linnaeus, as Lichen ciliaris. Linnaeus described it as a somewhat erect, leafy, grey lichen with linear, fringe-like segments that are ciliate (having hair-like structures, or cilia). He said it resembled a tree moss with hairy edges and small shield-like structures (apothecia). Linnaeus cited multiple references that described the lichen similarly, emphasizing its larger size, hairy characteristics, and shielded appearance. Linnaeus noted that this lichen is found on trees in Europe. Julius von Flotow is credited with the transfer of the taxon to the genus Anaptychia in 1850. A specimen illustrated by Johann Jacob Dillenius in 1742 was selected as the lectotype by Syo Kurokawa in his 1962 monograph on the genus Anaptychia.

Anaptychia ciliaris is the type species of Anaptychia. This genus was proposed by Gustav Wilhelm Körber in 1848 as a replacement for the name Hagenia, suggested by Franz Gerhard Eschweiler in 1824, but already being used for a plant genus. Körber described genus Anaptychia as follows (translated from Latin): "Apothecia bordered by a resupinate thallus (ascending thallus is channelled)". Although he did not assign a type species himself, A. ciliaris was later designated as type by Louis Pfeiffer in 1872.

Common names that have been used for Anaptychia ciliaris include "great ciliated lichen" and "eagle's claws".

=== Subtaxa ===
Several subspecies (subsp.), varieties (v.), and forms (f.) of the lichen have been described; Index Fungorum lists 45 of these subtaxa. This following list is representative, but not exhaustive:

- f. ciliaris

This is the nominate form, in which pycnidia (asexual fruiting bodies) are rare or absent, and the margins of apothecia are distinctly lacinulate (i.e., fringed or tattered).

- f. agropia (Ach.) Boist. (1903)

In this form, pycnidia are rare or absent, and the margins of apothecia are crenate (scalloped) or almost entire (i.e., smooth and not lobed or toothed).

- f. verrucosa (Ach.) Boist. (1903)

In this form, pycnidia are numerous; the verrucae (small wart-like protuberances) are the same colour as the thallus or somewhat darker.

- f. melanosticta (Ach.) Boberski (1886)

In this form, pycnidia are numerous; the verrucae are dark brown to blackish brown.

- f. nigrescens (Bory) Zahlbr. (1931)

In this form the laciniae are less than 2 mm wide.

- subsp. mamillata (Taylor) D.Hawks. & P.James (1980)

Compared to the nominate variety, subsp. mamillata has narrower lobes (about 2 mm wide), and a colouration that ranges from dark grey to brown when dry, to dark-olive green when wet, and its lacks and pruina on the thallus surface.

- var. melanosticta (Ach.) Boisel (1903)

This variety is dark brown with a sparsely hairy upper surface and is mainly found on seaside rocks, especially rocks visited by birds.

In 1962, Kurokawa identified five forms of Anaptychia ciliaris. However, by 1973, he believed these distinctions were merely character variations caused by different environmental conditions, thus deeming them taxonomically insignificant. He subsequently grouped them as synonyms. This perspective is shared by Species Fungorum, which does not recognize these subtaxa as having individual taxonomic importance and categorizes them under a collective synonymy. Most of these classifications have not been assessed using contemporary molecular phylogenetics. One exception is A. ciliaris var. melanosticta from coastal regions. DNA analysis revealed it might be distinct enough to be considered its own species, as it emerged as a sister taxon to other tested A. ciliaris samples.

== Description ==
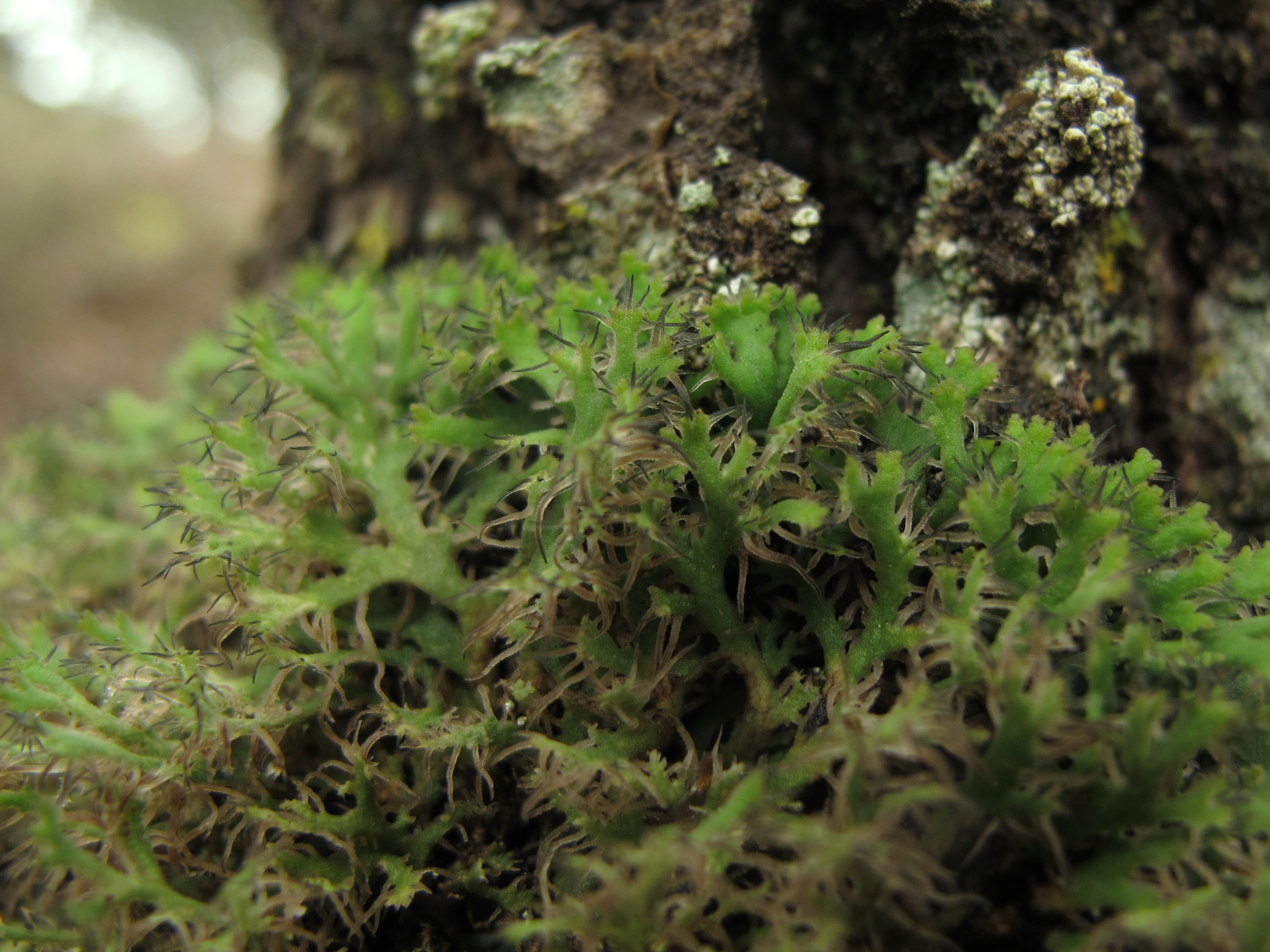
Anaptychia ciliaris is greenish when wet and has prominent cilia at the margins of its lobes, or laciniae.

The growth form of Anaptychia ciliaris merges characteristics of both foliose (leafy) and fruticose (bushy) lichens. Like many fruticose species, this lichen attaches to its substrate at a single point. Its fronds, akin to lobes of foliose lichens, lie close to the substrate with distinct upper and lower structures in a dorsiventral organization. This structure comprises an upper fibrous cortex of tightly packed hyphae and an algal layer with interspersed photobionts between the cortex and the medulla's looser hyphae. Its lower cortex is made of hyphae that are aligned more or less parallel to the surface. The lichen's upper surface is greyish, and the underside can be greyish or whitish, with both sides turning green when wet.

This lichen forms loose attachments to its substrate, allowing it to develop large colonies up to 15 cm (6 in) or more across. These colonies comprise neighbouring individuals each with elongated, linear structures (laciniae) that repeatedly branch dichotomously (into roughly equal parts). The laciniae generally have an upward, somewhat ascending orientation. Their width is up to about 2 mm (1/16 in), and they are about 300 μm thick. They appear either flat or somewhat convex and are covered in soft, fine hairs (pubescence). The fibrous outer cortex imparts structural strength to the laciniae, helping them maintain an upright orientation. Numerous pale, lateral cilia lie along the margins of the laciniae. They are dark grey to black and up to 15 mm (3/5 in) long. Sometimes, these long cilia form hapters—specialized aerial attachment organs with highly adhesive hyphae. Upon contact with nearby surfaces, often another lobe of its own thallus, these hapters induce branching and create a spreading sheath, leading to entanglement.

On the undersurface of the laciniae, the thallus lacks a cortex and appears paler than its upper surface. The lower surface features irregular veining and is adorned with rhizines (root-like attachment structures) along the margins, which are the same colour as the thallus. These rhizines measure between 1 and 6 mm (1/16 and 1/4 in) in length and may be either simple or occasionally branched towards the tips. The upper cortex of the laciniae has irregular thickening, and its lower surface has flexuous contours, occasionally extending downward to the lower surface of the thallus. The photobiont layer, housing cells measuring 10–15 μm in diameter, is frequently interrupted by the upper cortex, resulting in a discontinuous pattern. The medullary layer is typically very thin and may even be evanescent in some regions.

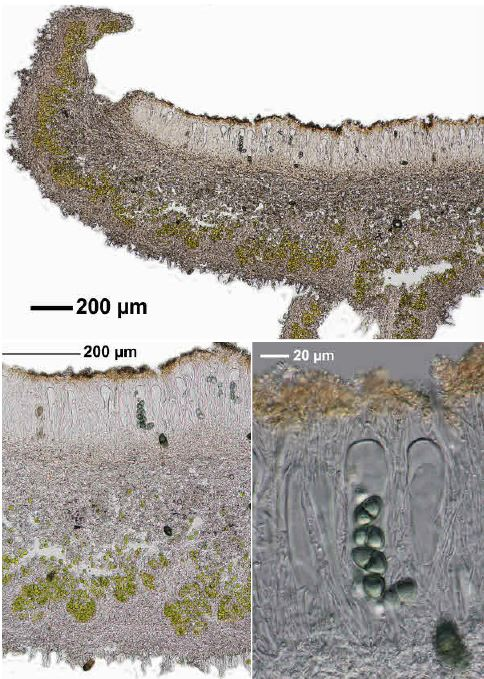
Various microscopic features: section of apothecia (top), more magnified view of section (bottom left), and ascus with ascospores (bottom right); the green cells in the apothecia are algae.

Apothecia, the reproductive structures, are found on the thallus. These structures are usually laminal (spread over the thallus surface), and either stipitate (with a stipe) or somewhat sessile (directly on the thallus). Their diameters range from 2 to 5 millimetres (1/16 to 3/16 in). Their margins are lacinulate (tattered), with ciliate lacinules along the edges. The disc of the apothecia is brown or dark brown, initially covered in a white pruina that may fade. The receptacle's hymenium, 150–200 μm tall, turns blue when stained with iodine. Its cortex is irregularly thickened and resistant to iodine staining. The cylindrical or clavate asci measure about 120 by 30 μm and usually contain between four and eight spores. Spores are dark brown, ellipsoid with rounded tips, and somewhat constricted at the centre. They measure 17–23 by 28–43 μm, with thin, uniformly thickened walls. Initially, spores are oval, and filled with granular and mucous substances. Eventually, a central partition (septum) forms, dividing the contents and leading to a two-cell state.

No lichen products have been identified from Anaptychia ciliaris, and it does not react with any of the standard chemical spot tests used to help identify lichens.

The morphology of A. ciliaris changes when exposed to adverse concentrations of ambient levels of air pollutants. It stops producing cilia, and the lobes become shorter and develop a warty upper surface.

=== Photobiont ===
The green algal species Trebouxia arboricola was the first photobiont of Anaptychia ciliaris to be identified. A concurrent study corroborated this association and suggested the nonspecific nature of A. ciliaris in incorporating algae from adjacent lichens. The A. ciliaris specimen studied was sourced from tree bark near Xanthoria parietina and Pleurosticta acetabulum. The internal transcribed spacer ribosomal DNA of the photobiont closely matched the sequences from the photobionts of these neighbouring lichens, suggesting they share the same algae. Anaptychia ciliaris undergoes sexual reproduction through the production of meiotic spores. In lichens, this reproductive mode disperses individual symbionts separately, leading to new symbiotic formations. Such a process facilitates genetic diversity and potential symbiotic shifts among different species.

In 2014, a different member of Trebouxia was shown to partner with Anaptychia ciliata. Trebouxia decolorans is a common and widespread symbiotic haploid green alga known for forming symbiotic associations with various lichen-forming fungi. Microsatellite primers, designed specifically to probe the genetic structure and diversity of this photobiont, were used to elucidate the intra-thallus genetic diversity of T. decolorans. This revealed the presence of multiple, genetically distinct photobiont strains within the thalli of the fungi. Particularly in A. ciliata, the predominant source of photobiont diversity seems to be intrathalline somatic mutations, possibly due to the longer lifespan of the fungus compared to the mycobiont, allowing ample time for mutations to accumulate.

=== Similar species ===
The moss-dwelling African species Anaptychia ethiopica closely resembles A. ciliata, so much so that its authors consider it a sorediate version of that species. It is only known to occur in the mountains of Ethiopia at altitudes over 3,500 m (11,500 ft).

== Habitat and distribution ==
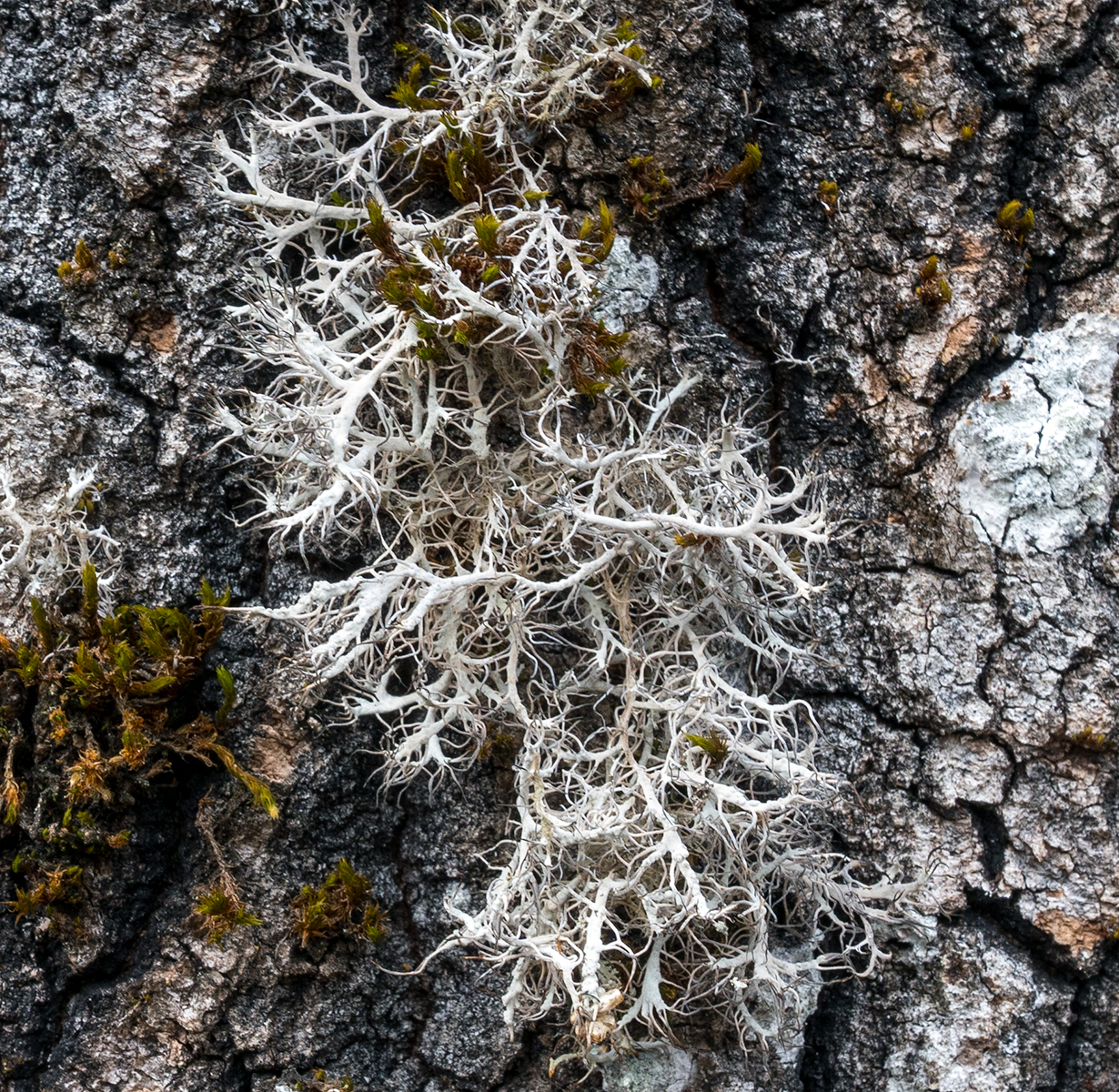
Dry individual on the bark of an old deciduous tree

Anaptychia ciliaris has a widespread but primarily Northern Hemisphere distribution, with its main range encompassing Europe, parts of Asia, and North Africa, while being notably absent from North America. Primarily found in Northern Europe, the distribution of A. ciliaris extends eastward to European Russia, the Caucasus, and northeastern Russia (Murmansk). It is also present in Central and Southern Europe, and the Canary Islands. In Africa, it is established across Morocco, and has been reported from Sudan. The lichen has sporadic records in Asia. In China, specimens have been collected from Xinjiang, Gansu, Shaanxi, and Hebei, at altitudes above 1,800 m (5,900 ft). Anaptychia ciliaris was among the top three most abundant lichens in Turkey's Lake Abant Nature Park 2018 biodiversity survey. In contrast, northern Germany and the UK have seen a decline in sightings. It is rare in Ireland, and nearly extinct in North East England. By 2010, Scotland recorded A. ciliaris in only four locations, with its scarcity attributed to air pollution and the declining elm tree population, impacted by Dutch elm disease. A century ago, it was more common in the UK, typically found thriving on trees in parklands and along cultivated roadsides. Widely distributed in Finland, it is abundant in populated areas, present in parks, alleys, and field edges, and also occurs on seashore cliffs.

Anaptychia ciliaris has adapted to growth on various substrates. Growing on bark, the lichen has been recorded frequently on Quercus rotundifolia, Q. pyrenaica, and Ulmus. Less commonly, it is found on Pinus sylvestris, P. nigra, Juniperus oxycedrus, Acer pseudoplatanus (sycamore) and Fagus sylvatica (beech). In Denmark, its usual hosts are Fraxinus and Tilia. Less frequently, it is found on calcareous and acidic rocks, and gravestones. A key characteristic of A. ciliaris is its preference for diffuse light.

In Poland, Anaptychia ciliaris is among six endangered species listed on the National red list. In Moscow's East European Plain area, it is an uncommon species and listed in the 2018 Red Data Book of the Moscow Region. It is mostly found in the area's birch grass-marsh forests, with its limited presence attributed to the air pollution from Moscow. Austria's Regional Red List also classifies A. ciliaris as endangered. Once common sight in Upper Austria, its decline is due to less availability of preferred substrate like mature, moss-covered, fertilised and dust-impregnated barks. Contemporary practices often result in the removal of trees before their bark matures to a consistency suitable for A. ciliaris.

Historical North American literature occasionally mentions the presence of A. ciliaris, but such references are misinterpretations. These instances refer to A. setifera, and A. ciliaris is not native to the continent.

== Biomonitoring ==
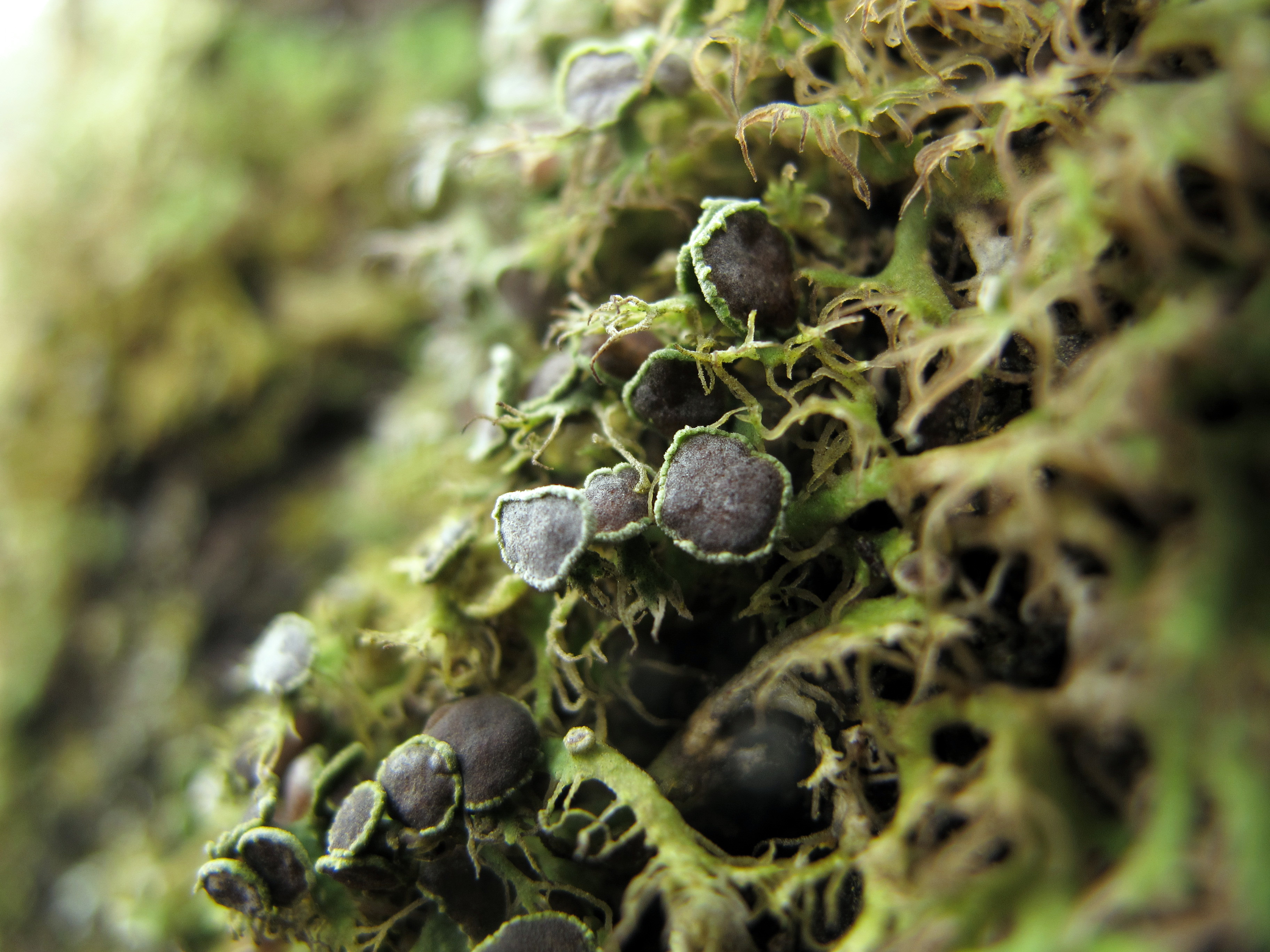
Cluster of apothecia with dark brown discs

Some lichens, including Anaptychia ciliaris, serve as excellent bioindicators due to their sensitivity to environmental changes and their ability to accumulate atmospheric pollutants, making them valuable tools for monitoring air quality and environmental health.

In Denmark and North Germany, a method was developed to gauge SO_{2} emissions using the health and fertility of indicator lichens like A. ciliaris. Similarly, England and Wales adopted a scale rating zones from 0 (most polluted) to 10 (least polluted), with A. ciliaris typically found in zones above 7, corresponding to SO_{2} levels around 40 micrograms per cubic metre. Historically common in 19th-century Netherlands, A. ciliaris experienced a significant decline throughout the 20th century. However, healthy specimens were unexpectedly found in 2010 on young ash trees in Brabant, a resurgence attributed to reduced air pollution and climate warming.

Monitoring the breakdown of chlorophyll into phaeophytin in A. ciliaris has proven effective for detecting air pollution. The species' ability to grow on different substrates enhances its utility in biomonitoring. In France, A. ciliaris was used to measure lead and cadmium emissions from a municipal solid waste incinerator. It has also been employed in Greece to assess the levels of heavy metals in polluted areas and near a lignite power plant.

In Sweden, A. ciliaris has a history of being used for monitoring atmospheric pollution. Following the Chernobyl disaster, it played a significant role in the biomonitoring of airborne radioactive fallout, with detected caesium-137 activity in Anaptychia ciliaris reaching as high as 14560 becquerels per kilogram.

== Uses ==
In the 17th Century, "Cyprus Powder" was used as a toilette powder (a fine, often fragranced powder used for personal grooming and cosmetic purposes) to whiten, scent, and cleanse the hair. It was a blend of oakmoss, Anaptychia ciliaris, and species of Usnea, fragranced with ambergris or musk, combined with the essences of roses, jasmine, or orange blossoms.

In the Ar Kaweit region of eastern Sudan, the lichen, known locally as bakour, was mixed with other plants and burned to repel insects.

=== Research ===
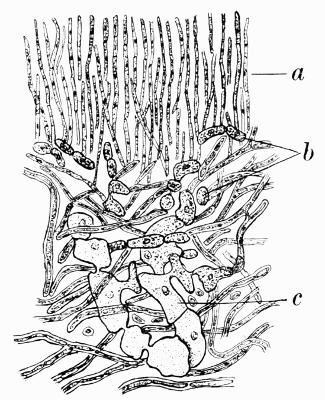
Vertical section of developing ascogonium in Anaptychia ciliaris, illustrated by German botanist Wilhelm Baur in 1904. a: paraphyses; b: ascogonial hyphae; c: ascogonial cells.

Historically, the lichen Anaptypia ciliaris has played a significant role in various scientific explorations of lichen structure and physiology. Early on, the French botanist Joseph Pitton de Tournefort reportedly first observed the lichen's distinctive large, dark-coloured spores. In 1849, Holle detailed the development of hyphae from lichen spores, using A. ciliaris as the subject of his study. In 1850 and 1851, the lichen was used by the German botanist Hermann Itzigsohn to demonstrate the existence of "spermagones" (conidia). In 1853, Julius Ferdinand Speerschneider, another German botanist, reported the division of the lichen's photobiont cells (then referred to as gonidia) in moist thallus sections. He found that in humid air, hyphae decomposed within two months, while algae thrived, growing and dividing rapidly. Subsequently, small, light green structures emerged in the decomposing thallus centre, evolving into lichen primordia.

Further insights into lichen structure came when Reginald Heber Howe, Jr. presented the lichen's cortex as an exemplar of the "fibrous" cortex — a tissue type characterised by long, slender, infrequently branched hyphae growing parallel to the surface. The German bryologist Johann Hedwig, in the eighteenth century, expanded on these findings. In his 1784 work Fundamentum Historiae Naturalis Muscorum Frondosorum, he described and depicted Anaptypia ciliaris apothecia, dark septate spores, and pycnidia. He identified tiny bodies associated with the organism, measuring approximately 50 μm long and 24 μm thick, as "semina" — a term Acharius later replaced with "spores" in 1803.

In the following century, research on Anaptypia ciliaris advanced further. Pierre Augustin Dangeard, in 1894, studied the origin and development of asci in lichens, using Anaptypia ciliaris as a model. René Maire explored cellular biology by observing nuclear division in an ascospore prior to septum formation. The lichen's practical applications were also investigated. In 1825, Joseph Placide Alexandre Léorier documented Roy of Tonnerre's pioneering technique to produce alcohol from lichens, notably Anaptypia ciliaris. This innovation was remarkable because lichens, unlike fruits or grains, generally lack the abundant sugars usually used as feedstock in traditional alcohol production.

Research has uncovered various potential biological activities of Anaptychia ciliaris. Its extracts, tested for antibacterial and insecticidal effects against certain pathogenic bacteria and the Culiseta longiareolata mosquito larvae, showed moderate larvicidal properties. In tests against fish bacterial pathogens, A. ciliaris demonstrated antibacterial effects, particularly towards Aeromonas hydrophila, Streptococcus agalactiae, Enterococcus faecalis, and Lactococcus garvieae. The active metabolites in A. ciliaris, including various antioxidants, vary in presence and concentration depending on its tree substrate.

== Growth in culture ==
The mycobiont of Anaptychia ciliaris can be cultivated in axenic (pure) culture. More than 100 years ago, the Finnish phycologist Harry Warén described the fungal partner of A. ciliaris (then known as Physcia ciliaris) grown from spores, noting its compact mycelia and large globular cells, mistakenly believed to contain chlorophyll. Researchers can initiate spore growth by placing apothecia near an inverted petri dish, allowing mature spores to be ejected onto the growth medium and begin germinating Anaptychia ciliaris spores typically attach to the growth media as isolated units, rather than in clusters, a trait also seen in other lichen species and characteristic of certain lichen families. Anaptychia ciliaris is notable for its consistent spore release in laboratory conditions. This consistent spore release makes A. ciliaris ideal for studying lichen reproduction and development in aposymbiotic cultures. In these settings, researchers grow the fungal component separately from its algal partner, allowing for a detailed examination of the fungus's individual characteristics and behavior. On average, these spores took six to seven days to begin germination.

Anaptychia ciliaris shows variability in spore production, reflecting its heterothallic life cycle. This contributes to genetic diversity, an important factor in the species' adaptability. In the early stages of growth, the presence of carbon sources enhances the filamentous development of the mycobiont. These findings align with the lichen's characteristic slow growth rate and its ability to support apothecia of different ages on a single thallus, further contributing to genetic variation. The morphology, metabolism, and pigmentation of Anaptychia ciliaris are particularly influenced by sugars and sugar alcohols, varying significantly in different culture media.

== Species interactions ==
Anaptychia ciliaris is part of a web of ecological relationships, serving as a host for various lichenicolous organisms, which are species that live on, and often parasitize, lichens. Among the fungi that parasitize A. ciliaris is Tremella anaptychiae, a species described in 2017. This fungus produces spherical or tuberculate fruit bodies, ranging in colour from cream to pinkish, brownish, or blackish, and is found in Italy, Macedonia, Spain (including the Canary Islands), Sweden, and Greece. Catillaria mediterranea, a lichen with a reduced thallus, and Monodictys anaptychiae, a rare hyphomycete, also grow on A. ciliaris. Monodictys anaptychiae may exclusively target A. ciliaris; infection leads to thallus surface damage and discolouration. In the UK, the Anaptychia ciliaris subspecies mamillata often shows tiny black dots on its lobes, a result of Stigmidium hageniae parasitism. Additionally, A. ciliaris is subject to infection by other lichenicolous fungi such as Pronectria tincta.

== See also ==
- List of lichens named by Carl Linnaeus
