= Amandinea decedens =

Scientific classification
- Kingdom: Fungi
- Division: Ascomycota
- Class: Lecanoromycetes
- Order: Caliciales
- Family: Caliciaceae
- Genus: Amandinea
- Species: A. decedens

Binomial name
- Amandinea decedens (Nyl.) Blaha, H.Mayrhofer & Elix (2016)

Synonyms
- Lecidea decedens Nyl. (1869)

Species of lichen

Amandinea decedens is a crustose lichen in the family Caliciaceae, first described as Lecidea decedens by Finnish botanist William Nylander in 1869. It was assigned (invalidly) the name, Amandinea decedens, in 2002 by Juliane Blaha and Helmut Mayrhofer. The name was validly published in 2016 by Blaha, Mayrhofer and Jack Elix

On coastal rocks, when it is found, it is abundant.
