= Anaptychia ethiopica =

Scientific classification
- Domain: Eukaryota
- Kingdom: Fungi
- Division: Ascomycota
- Class: Lecanoromycetes
- Order: Caliciales
- Family: Physciaceae
- Genus: Anaptychia
- Species: A. ethiopica

Binomial name
- Anaptychia ethiopica Swinscow & Krog (1976)

Species of lichen

Anaptychia ethiopica is a species of lichen in the family Teloschistaceae. Found in East Africa, China, and Russia, it was formally described as a new species in 1976 by lichenologists Thomas Douglas Victor Swinscow and Hildur Krog. The type specimen was collected from Mount Bwahit (Begemder, Ethiopia), where it was found growing on moss.

== Description ==
The lichen has a thallus that ranges in colour from brown to grey and forms an irregular mat loosely attached to its substrate. The lobes of the lichen are separate from each other and can be straight or slightly wedge-shaped, with both long and short side lobes. The upper part of the thallus has an uneven texture, with the lower part sometimes with vein-like ridges. The underside of the thallus is light-coloured and not covered by a protective layer. Notable features include soralia, which are structures that house soredia (reproductive propagules) and are mainly found at or near the tips of the lobes, but occasionally further back on the main body. The soredia themselves are grain-like in appearance.

This lichen bears similarities to some forms of Anaptychia ciliaris, particularly those found on exposed rocks. It can be viewed as the sorediate version of that species. Its colour is typically greyish-brown, with occasional pinkish hues and can even appear almost black. Most of its lobes are covered in a fine, hair-like layer, giving them a frosty look. The underside ranges from white to pale brown, with thickened edges and sporadic vein-like ridges descending from the underside. The soralia are hollowed-out but can be full of soredia, overflowing in some cases. Anaptychia ethiopica does not contain any lichen products detectable using thin-layer chromatography.

Examining the structure more closely, the lobes have a thickness ranging from 150 to 300 μm, and they exhibit variation across different parts. In the cortex, or outer layer, a few distinct zones can be observed. Starting from the outside, there is a thin layer of colourless fungal filaments (hyphae) followed by a brown-tinted main cortical layer, approximately 5–15 μm thick. Tomentum, the hairy covering, is present on both the upper and lower surfaces, and the filaments are 10–30 μm long with rough walls. This cortex surrounds the sides of the lobes, extending to the underside in several places. Within the medulla, or inner layer, the algal cells lie amidst loosely arranged fungal threads. Most of the thallus underside consists of web-like fibres.

== Habitat and distribution ==
Anaptychia ethiopica was first described from East Africa, where it grows on rocks, on bryophytes, and plant debris. There, the lichen is only found in alpine zones, above elevations of 3,500 m (11,500 ft). In 1999, the lichen was recorded from Xinjiang, China, at an altitude of about 2,400 m (7,900 ft). A decade later in 2009, it was reported to occur in the Russian Arctic, where it was found growing on rocks in tundra in a low-altitude region in the Byrranga Mountains. These Russian specimens were being infected by the lichenicolous fungus Phaeosporobolus alpinus.
