= Anaptychia nevadensis =

Scientific classification
- Kingdom: Fungi
- Division: Ascomycota
- Class: Lecanoromycetes
- Order: Caliciales
- Family: Physciaceae
- Genus: Anaptychia
- Species: A. nevadensis

Binomial name
- Anaptychia nevadensis Hollinger, Noell & S.Leavitt (2022)

Species of lichen

Anaptychia nevadensis is a species of foliose lichen in the family Physciaceae. It was described in 2022 from the north-western Great Basin of the western United States. It is an abundantly fertile, soredia-lacking member of section Protoanaptychia and differs from the Eurasian A. desertorum in having only scant whitish pruina (typically restricted to the lobe tips), longer ascospores on average, and frequent production of variolaric acid.

== Taxonomy ==
The species was formally described as Anaptychia nevadensis with the holotype from the Jackson Range, Humboldt County, Nevada. The species epithet refers to its core range in Nevada. The authors segregated it from look-alike saxicolous forms of A. desertorum based on morphology, chemistry (variolaric acid usually present in A. nevadensis, uncommon in A. desertorum), and longer spores and conidia, and they supported the species rank with molecular analyses of ITS (and combined ITS + mtSSU) sequences.

== Description ==
The lichen forms small to mid-sized rosettes, usually 1.5–7.0 cm across, that sit loosely on the rock. The lobes are short to moderately elongated (roughly 0.7–1.8 mm long and 0.5–1.2 mm wide), somewhat arched, and end in tightly inrolled, scalloped tips. The upper surface is pale to brownish gray and generally lacks the sugar-dust coating (pruina); when present, the pruina is faint and mostly limited to the lobe tips. Coarse bristles are common near the growing tips, and the upper cortex bears minute, single-celled bumps that look like tiny hairs under a microscope. The lower surface is pale, with a thin cortex only near the center of the thallus and becoming whitish and without a cortex toward the lobe tips. The species does not produce soredia (powdery propagules).

Fruiting bodies (apothecia) are usually abundant and often crowd together near the center of the rosette. They are round, about 0.5–1.5 (less often up to 2.0) mm in diameter, with a disk that is mostly free of pruina; a rim of thallus tissue (thalline margin) persists around the edge. The sexual spores (ascospores) are typically slightly bent and measure about 23–35(–42) × 12–17 μm (average length per specimen around 29 μm). Tiny flask-shaped structures (pycnidia) are immersed in the thallus and release asexual spores (conidia) that are rod- to short-ellipsoid shaped, about 4.5–6.2(–7.1) × 1.3–2.3 μm. Standard spot tests on the thallus are negative; thin-layer chromatography commonly detects variolaric acid, and weak K+ or KC+ (yellow) reactions may be seen where that compound is concentrated.

== Habitat and distribution ==
Anaptychia nevadensis grows on siliceous rock (rhyolite, andesite, basalt, granite, quartzite), occasionally overgrowing moss. It favors sheltered microsites – especially crevices and steep, north-facing faces – within open outcrops, typically at about 1,550–2,100 m (5,090–6,890 ft), with an observed range about 1,375–2,300 m (4,511–7,546 ft). The species is restricted to the north-western Great Basin of the U.S.A., with confirmed records in Nevada, adjacent northeastern California (Warner Mountains) and southeastern Oregon (Steens Mountain). It often occurs near, but is readily separable from, the sorediate A. elbursiana. The authors note that its range coincides with areas having relatively more winter-weighted precipitation and hypothesize intolerance of summer monsoonal thunderstorms.
