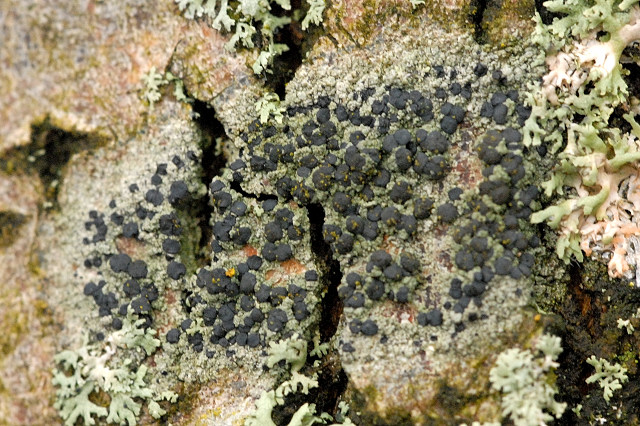
- Amandinea punctata

Scientific classification
- Kingdom: Fungi
- Division: Ascomycota
- Class: Lecanoromycetes
- Order: Caliciales
- Family: Caliciaceae
- Genus: Amandinea; M.Choisy ex Scheid. & H.Mayrhofer (1993)

Type species
- Amandinea coniops (Wahlenb.) M.Choisy ex Scheid. & H.Mayrhofer (1993)

Synonyms
- Amandinea M.Choisy (1950)

= Amandinea =

Genus of lichens

Amandinea is a genus of lichenized fungi in the family Caliciaceae. Genetic studies indicates that the genus Amandinea and Buellia are the same, although this is not widely accepted.

== Taxonomy ==
The genus was originally circumscribed by Maurice Choisy in 1950, with Amandinea coniops assigned as the type species. However, the name was published invalidly because it was not accompanied by a Latin description or diagnosis, a requirement of the nomenclatural rules of the time. Christoph Scheidegger and Helmut Mayrhofer published the genus name validly in 1993. The generic name honours French Madame Amandine Manière, an acquaintance of Choisy.

== Description ==
Amandinea species have a crustose thallus ranging from cracked (rimose) to slightly blistered (bullate). The internal white layer (medulla) is iodine-negative (I−), meaning it does not turn blue in the standard iodine test and is therefore non-amyloid. The photosynthetic partner is a chlorococcoid green alga, i.e. with small, spherical cells. Sexual fruiting bodies are apothecia with either a lecanorine margin (rim made of thallus tissue) or a lecideine margin (dark, non-thalline rim). These apothecia may be partly sunk into the thallus (immersed) or sit on top of it (sessile), with either a broad or narrowed base; the discs are typically black or nearly so. The tissue beneath the spore layer (hypothecium) is pale to dark brown, sometimes with olive tones.

Inside the apothecia, the hamathecium is made of paraphyses—microscopic, partitioned threads that run between the spore sacs. These are unbranched or branch only near the tip; the tips are swollen and pigmented, and many bear a dark brown cap. The asci (spore sacs) are club-shaped and of the Lecanora-type; they usually contain eight spores, though four or more than eight may occur. The ascospores are brown and 1-septate (with a single internal cross-wall), sometimes showing a thicker median wall; their surfaces are often finely wrinkled (rugose), a feature that generally requires electron microscopy to see reliably. Asexual reproduction is common via pycnidia (tiny flask-like structures) that produce curved, thread-like conidia up to about 30 μm long. Chemical tests rarely detect secondary metabolites in this genus (norstictic acid is uncommon but occurs in a few species), while most species show no substances detectable by thin-layer chromatography.

== Species ==
As of November 2023, Species Fungorum (in the Catalogue of Life) accepts 94 species of Amandinea.

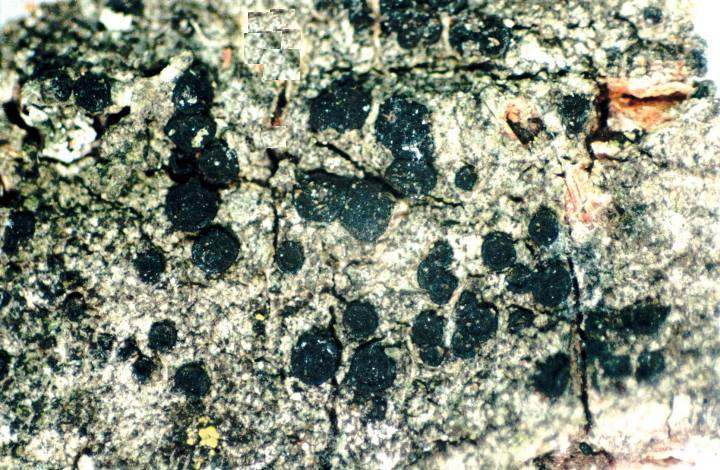
Amandinea polyspora

- Amandinea analgifera (Aptroot & Diederich) Elix (2019)
- Amandinea antipodensis Elix (2017)
- Amandinea augusta (Vain.) Søchting & Øvstedal (2004)
- Amandinea australasica Blaha, H.Mayrhofer & Elix (2016)
- Amandinea austroconiops Elix & Kantvilas (2016)
- Amandinea babingtonii (Hook.f. & Taylor) Søchting & Øvstedal (2004)
- Amandinea bittangabeensis Elix & P.M.McCarthy (2020)
- Amandinea brugierae (Vain.) Marbach (2000)
- Amandinea brunneola Elix & H.Mayrhofer (2016)
- Amandinea brussei Elix & H.Mayrhofer (2021)
- Amandinea cacuminum (Th.Fr.) H.Mayrhofer & Sheard (2002)
- Amandinea clearyi Elix & Øvstedal (2020)
- Amandinea conglomerata Elix & Kantvilas (2013)
- Amandinea coniops (Wahlenb.) M.Choisy ex Scheid. & H.Mayrhofer (1993)
- Amandinea conranensis Elix & P.M.McCarthy (2017)
- Amandinea crassiuscula Giralt & Etayo (2000) – Europe
- Amandinea decedens (Nyl.) Blaha, H.Mayrhofer & Elix (2016)
- Amandinea delangei Elix & H.Mayrhofer (2021)
- Amandinea deminuta Hafellner (2004)
- Amandinea destituta Elix & Kantvilas (2016)
- Amandinea devilliersiana Elix & Kantvilas (2013)
- Amandinea diorista (Nyl.) Marbach (2000)
- Amandinea discreta (Darb.) Elix & H.Mayrhofer (2018)
- Amandinea dudleyensis Kantvilas & Elix (2013)
- Amandinea efflorescens (Müll.Arg.) Marbach (2000)
- Amandinea endochroa (Malme) Marbach (2000)
- Amandinea errata Marbach (2000)
- Amandinea extenuata (Müll.Arg.) Marbach (2000)
- Amandinea falklandica (Darb.) Elix & Kantvilas (2013)
- Amandinea feraxioides Elix & Kantvilas (2017)
- Amandinea fouquieriensis (Bungartz) Elix & Kantvilas (2013)
- Amandinea fuscoatratula (Zahlbr.) Elix (2015)
- Amandinea hnatiukii Elix (2017)
- Amandinea hypohyalina Elix & P.M.McCarthy (2020)
- Amandinea hypopallida Elix (2017)
- Amandinea hypostictica (Elix) Elix (2018)
- Amandinea incrustans (J.Steiner) Marbach (2000)
- Amandinea isabellina Søchting & Øvstedal (2004)
- Amandinea julianeae H.Mayrhofer & Elix (2016)
- Amandinea langloisii Imshaug ex Marbach (2000)
- Amandinea latemarginata (Darb.) Søchting & Øvstedal (2004)
- Amandinea lecideina (H.Mayrhofer & Poelt) Scheid. & H.Mayrhofer (1993)
- Amandinea lignicola Tønsberg & A.Nordin (2012)
- Amandinea litoralis (Zahlbr.) H.Mayrhofer & Elix (2016)
- Amandinea lobarica Giralt, van den Boom & Elix (2015) – Guatemala
- Amandinea madeirensis van den Boom, Elix & Giralt (2020) – Portugal
- Amandinea maritima Giralt, van den Boom & Elix (2011)
- Amandinea mediospora Marbach (2000)
- Amandinea megaspora Marbach (2000)
- Amandinea melaxanthella (Nyl.) Marbach (2000)
- Amandinea meridionalis Elix (2022)
- Amandinea microsticta (Meyen & Flot.) Marbach (2000)
- Amandinea montana (H.Magn.) Marbach (2000)
- Amandinea mountmeensis Elix & H.Mayrhofer (2020)
- Amandinea myrticola Giralt, van den Boom & Elix (2011)
- Amandinea nana Elix & P.M.McCarthy (2018)
- Amandinea natalensis (Vain.) Marbach (2000)
- Amandinea nebulosa (Elix & Kantvilas) Elix & Kantvilas (2016)
- Amandinea neoconglomerata Elix (2017)
- Amandinea nitrophila (Zahlbr.) Elix (2015)
- Amandinea occidentalis Elix & Kantvilas (2013)
- Amandinea okainensis Elix & H.Mayrhofer (2018)
- Amandinea oleicola (Nyl.) Giralt & van den Boom (2012)
- Amandinea ornata H.Mayrhofer & Elix (2016)
- Amandinea otagensis (Zahlbr.) Blaha, Elix & H.Mayrhofer (2016)
- Amandinea pelidna (Ach.) Fryday & Arcadia (2012)
- Amandinea petermannii (Hue) Matzer, H.Mayrhofer & Scheid. (1994) – Antarctica
- Amandinea pilbarensis Elix (2020)
- Amandinea pillagaensis Elix & Kantvilas (2013)
- Amandinea polyspora (Willey) E.Lay & P.F.May (1997)
- Amandinea polyxanthonica (Elix) Elix (2019)
- Amandinea porulosa (Müll.Arg.) Elix (2015)
- Amandinea prospersa (Nyl.) Elix & H.Mayrhofer (2017)
- Amandinea prothallinata Elix & H.Mayrhofer (2017)
- Amandinea pseudomultispora S.Y.Kondr., Lőkös & Hur (2015)
- Amandinea puertomonttensis Elix, H.Mayrhofer & J.M.Rodr. (2018)
- Amandinea punctata (Hoffm.) Coppins & Scheid. (1993)
- Amandinea rangitatensis Elix & H.Mayrhofer (2017)
- Amandinea ropinii H.Mayrhofer, Ropin & Elix (2016)
- Amandinea santantaoensis Elix & van den Boom (2022)
- Amandinea skottsbergii (J.Steiner & Zahlbr.) Şenkard. (2010)
- Amandinea stajsicii Elix & Kantvilas (2013)
- Amandinea subbadioatra (C.Knight) Elix & Kantvilas (2016)
- Amandinea subcervina (Nyl.) Elix (2017)
- Amandinea subduplicata (Vain.) Marbach (2000)
- Amandinea submontana Marbach (2000)
- Amandinea subplicata (Nyl.) Øvstedal (2001)
- Amandinea trassii S.Y.Kondr., Lőkös & Hur (2016)
- Amandinea tristiuscula (Nyl.) Elix (2019)
- Amandinea turgescens (Tuck.) Marbach (2000)
- Amandinea variabilis Elix, Blaha & H.Mayrhofer (2016)
- Amandinea vitellina Blaha, Elix & Mavhofer (2016)
- Amandinea wagoorooensis Elix (2022)
- Amandinea windmillensis Elix (2019)
- Amandinea xylographella (Nyl.) Marbach (2000)

== Gallery ==
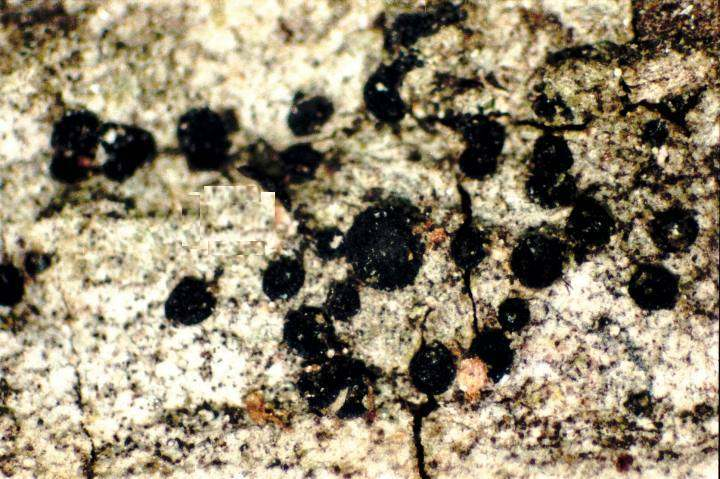
Amandinea polyspora

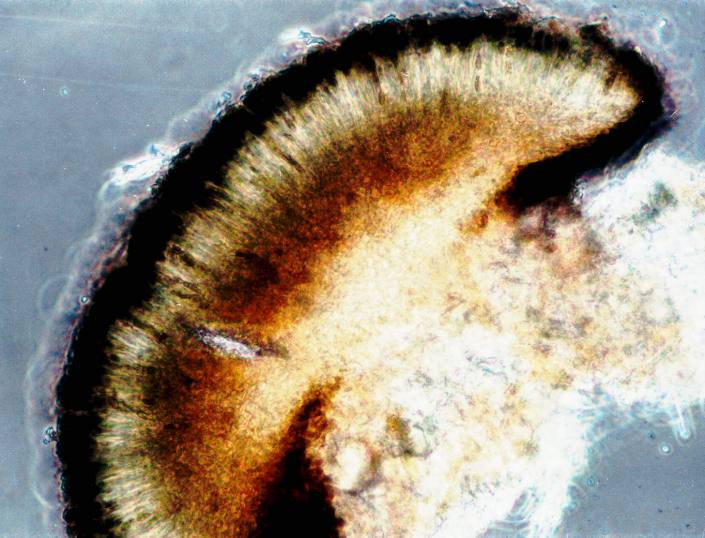
Photograph of a cross section of an apothecium from A. punctata taken through a compound microscope, x400. (The exciple is uniformly pigmented dark brown; the epihymenium is brown; the hypothecium is brown black.)

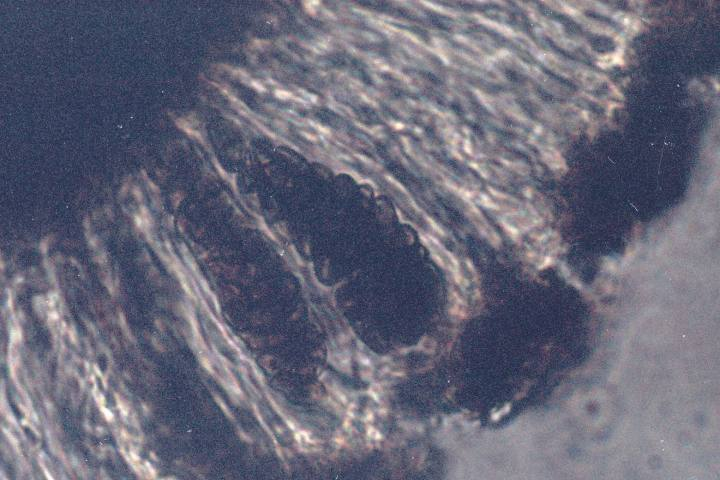
Photograph of a cross section of an apothecium of A. polyspora through a compound microscope (x1000) showing 25+ spores per ascus

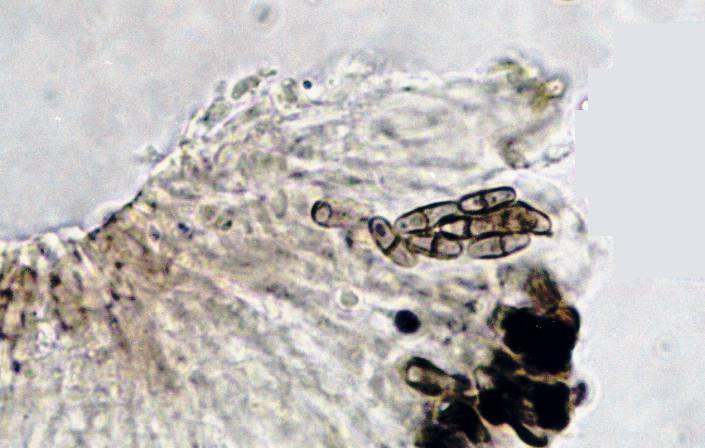
Photograph of a cross section of an apothecium of A. punctata taken through a compound microscope (x1000), showing 8 brown 1-septate spores per ascus.
