= Amandinea maritima =

Scientific classification
- Kingdom: Fungi
- Division: Ascomycota
- Class: Lecanoromycetes
- Order: Caliciales
- Family: Caliciaceae
- Genus: Amandinea
- Species: A. maritima

Binomial name
- Amandinea maritima Giralt, van den Boom & Elix (2011)

Species of lichen

Amandinea maritima is a species of corticolous (bark-dwelling), crustose lichen in the family Caliciaceae. This whitish to creamy-coloured lichen forms thin, continuous layers on its substrate, primarily juniper species in coastal dune ecosystems. It is distinguished by its black reproductive structures, which develop from within the thallus and mature to reach up to 0.6 mm in diameter. Found exclusively in coastal regions, its range includes the western Mediterranean coastline, southern Portugal, the Azores, and the Canary Islands, where it occurs alongside other maritime lichen species adapted to similar environmental conditions.

== Taxonomy ==
The species was first described to science in 2011 by the lichenologists Mireia Giralt i Esteve, Pieter P.G. van den Boom, and John Elix, based on specimens collected in Sardinia, Italy. The species epithet maritima alludes to its preferred habitat.

== Description ==
Amandinea maritima is a crustose lichen that grows on bark, forming a thin, continuous layer on its substrate. The main body (thallus) ranges from smooth and thin to moderately thick with a bumpy texture, appearing whitish to creamy in colour and often covering extensive areas. It lacks a distinct boundary, and its inner layer does not react with iodine and contains no calcium oxalate crystals. The photosynthetic partner is a round green alga measuring 10–15 micrometres (μm) in diameter.

The reproductive structures (apothecia) undergo a distinctive development, initially emerging from within the thallus with a rim matching the thallus colour, which may be smooth or cracked. As they mature, these structures develop their own proper rim while remaining broadly attached to the surface, often touching one another and reaching up to 0.6 mm in diameter. The central disc is black without powdery coating, starting concave and becoming flat, rarely slightly convex. The rim is thick in young apothecia and thins with age but always remains visible.

Internally, the reproductive tissues include a colourless spore-producing layer (hymenium) 50–80 μm high without oil droplets, and a colourless supporting layer 75–120 μm high. The sterile filaments have dark brown caps at their tips, measuring 3–6 μm in diameter. Each spore sac contains 8 spores that are typically 10.7–13.3 μm long by 5.2–6.5 μm wide, ellipsoid in shape, with a single partition (septum) that doesn't cause constriction and a faintly rough surface under high magnification.

This lichen also produces abundant asexual reproductive structures that are partially embedded in the thallus, releasing thread-like, curved reproductive cells measuring 12–20 by 0.5–1 μm. Chemical analysis reveals either no compounds or the presence of lichesterinic acid, a characteristic lichen substance. The structural features of Amandinea maritima—including its growth pattern, reproductive structures, and microscopic characteristics—are key to its identification and classification among related lichen species.

== Habitat and distribution ==
Amandinea maritima is exclusively found in coastal regions, with a range encompassing the western Mediterranean coastline and extending to the Atlantic shores of southern Portugal, the Azores, and the Canary Islands. This lichen specifically inhabits coastal-dune ecosystems, showing a strong preference for growing on juniper species. Its distinctly maritime distribution pattern reflects its adaptation to the unique environmental conditions of coastal zones where salt spray, strong winds, and fluctuating humidity levels create specialised ecological niches.

Within these coastal habitats, A. maritima is frequently accompanied by other lichen species that share similar Mediterranean-Atlantic-Macaronesian distribution patterns, indicating a distinct coastal lichen community. Common associates include Caloplaca aegatica, Diploicia canescens, Endohyalina kalbii, Rinodina anomala, and Rinodina nimisii, all of which are adapted to maritime environmental conditions. This consistent association suggests that these species form a characteristic ecological assemblage responding to similar environmental factors.

In the Canary Islands, the lichen's community associations are more varied, with additional companion species observed on the same Juniperus substrates. These include Bactrospora patellarioides, Lecanora sabinae, Labrocarpon canariensis (which grows on Pertusaria), and Thelopsis isiaca.
