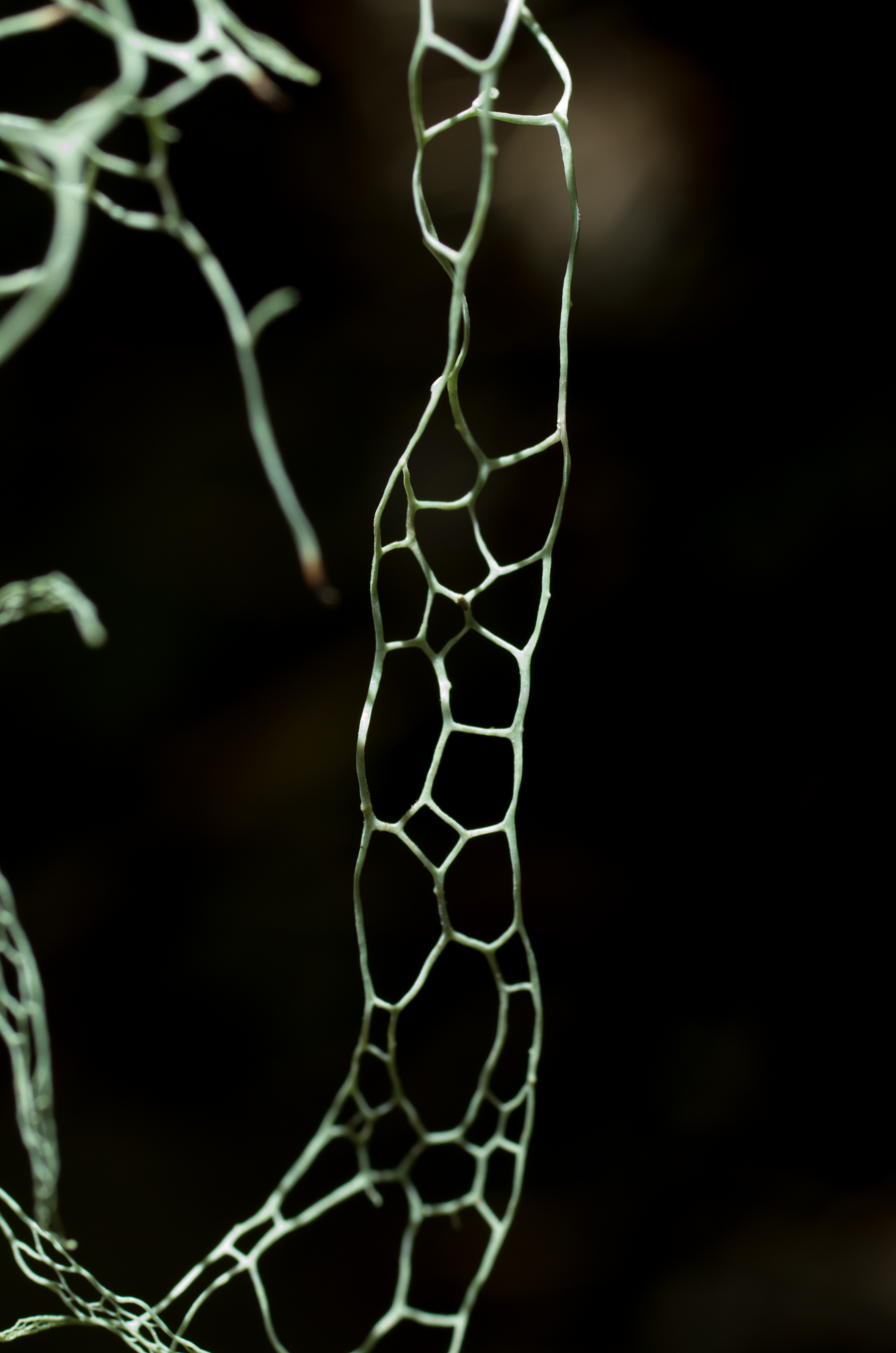

Conservation status
- Apparently Secure (NatureServe)

Scientific classification
- Kingdom: Fungi
- Division: Ascomycota
- Class: Lecanoromycetes
- Order: Lecanorales
- Family: Ramalinaceae
- Genus: Ramalina
- Species: R. menziesii

Binomial name
- Ramalina menziesii Taylor (1847)

Synonyms
- Endocarpon reticulatum Ach. ex Steud. (1824); Lichen reticulatus Nöhden (1801); Lichen reticulatus Zoega (1775); Ramalina reticulata Kremp. (1869); Roccella reticulata Kremp. (1876)

= Ramalina menziesii =

Species of lichen-forming fungus

Ramalina menziesii, the lace lichen or fishnet, is a pale yellowish-green to grayish-green fruticose lichen. It grows up to a meter long, hanging from bark and twigs in a distinctive net-like or lace-like pattern that is unlike any other lichen in North America. It becomes a deeper green when wet. Apothecia are lecanorine. Lace lichen is an important food source for deer in the Coast Range of California, and a source of nest material for birds. It is highly variable in its growth form, with branches sometimes so slender as to appear like strands, sometimes tiny, and sometimes large with broadly flattened branches.

After years of effort, the California Lichen Society was able to convince the state legislature to recognize the lichen as the state lichen of California, the first lichen so honored.

== Taxonomy ==
In 1775, the species was given its first Linnean binomial name of Lichen retiformis by Archibald Menzies. It was also referred to as Lichen reticulatis by Nohden in 1801. Thomas Taylor then incorporated the taxon into the genus Ramalina and described it in the London Journal of Botany in 1847 as Ramalina menziesii.

In 2024, Scott LaGreca and coauthors stabilised the application of the name Ramalina menziesii by selecting a single lectotype specimen (the one specimen that now serves as the nomenclatural standard for the species) from among the original material ("syntypes") preserved in Thomas Taylor's herbarium at the Farlow Herbarium, Harvard University. In the same paper, they also lectotypified several names that have been treated as synonyms of R. menziesii (including Chlorodictyon foliosum, Ramalina reticulata, and Ramalina retiformis) and discussed the complicated publication history of the illegitimate name Lichen reticulatus, which underlies R. reticulata. Together, these typifications tie the well-known lichen to a clearly defined reference specimen and reduce the scope for different authors to apply the name to different concepts in the future.

Vernacular names used for the species include "lace lichen" and "fishnet".

== Description ==
Ramalina menziesii is a fruticose epiphytic lichen found on coastal regions of North America that produce a large and conspicuous thallus. Expansion of its perforated tissue from the thallus apex produces its net-like morphology. This morphology ranges from thick nets in sunny regions to thin filaments in foggy regions. Studies have suggested that this morphological variation is a result of both genetic differences between populations, as well as phenotypic plasticity within the species.

Lichen spot tests on the cortex are K−, C−, P− and KC+ (dark yellow).

== Distribution and habitat ==
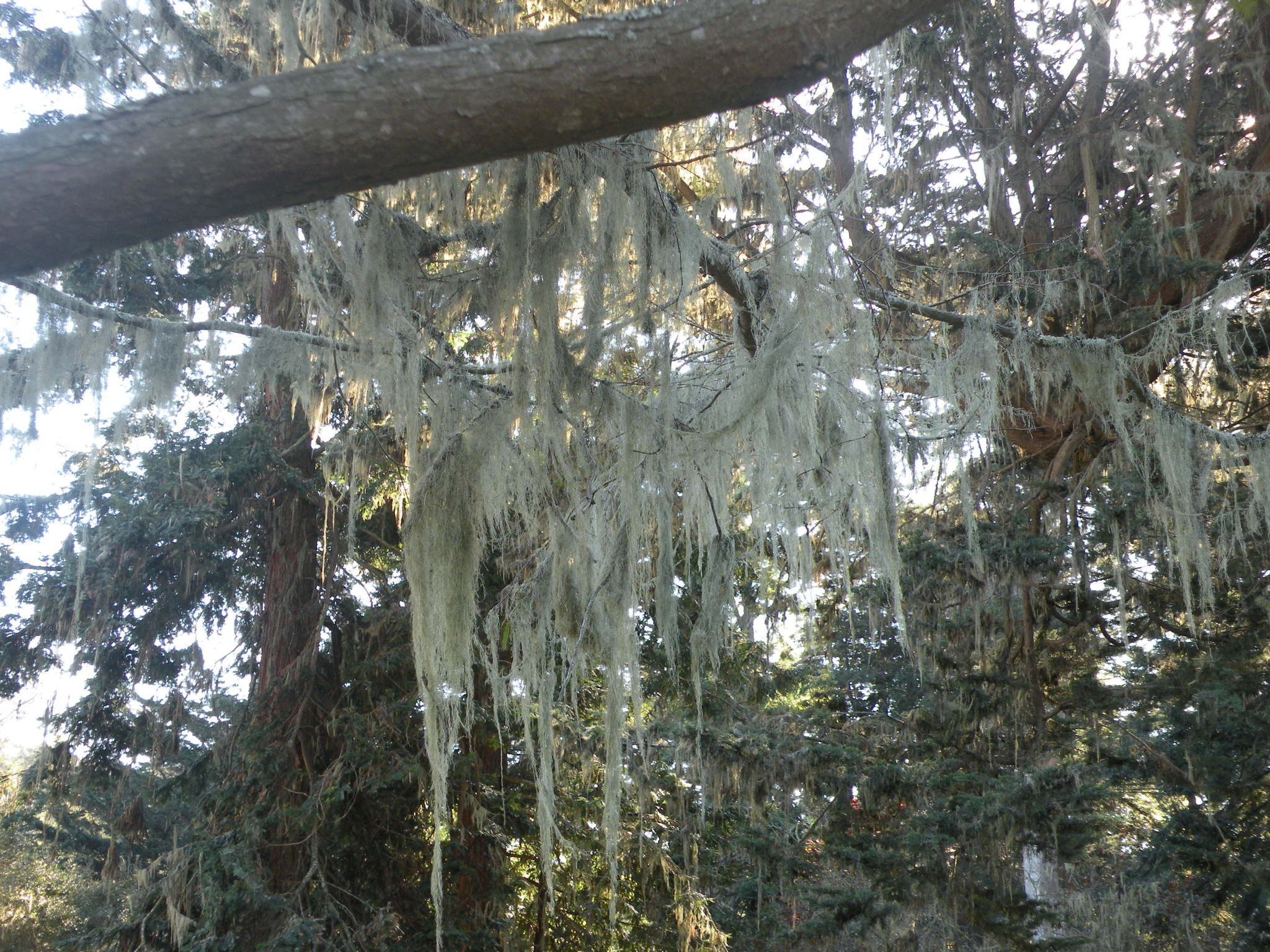
In Golden Gate Park, San Francisco

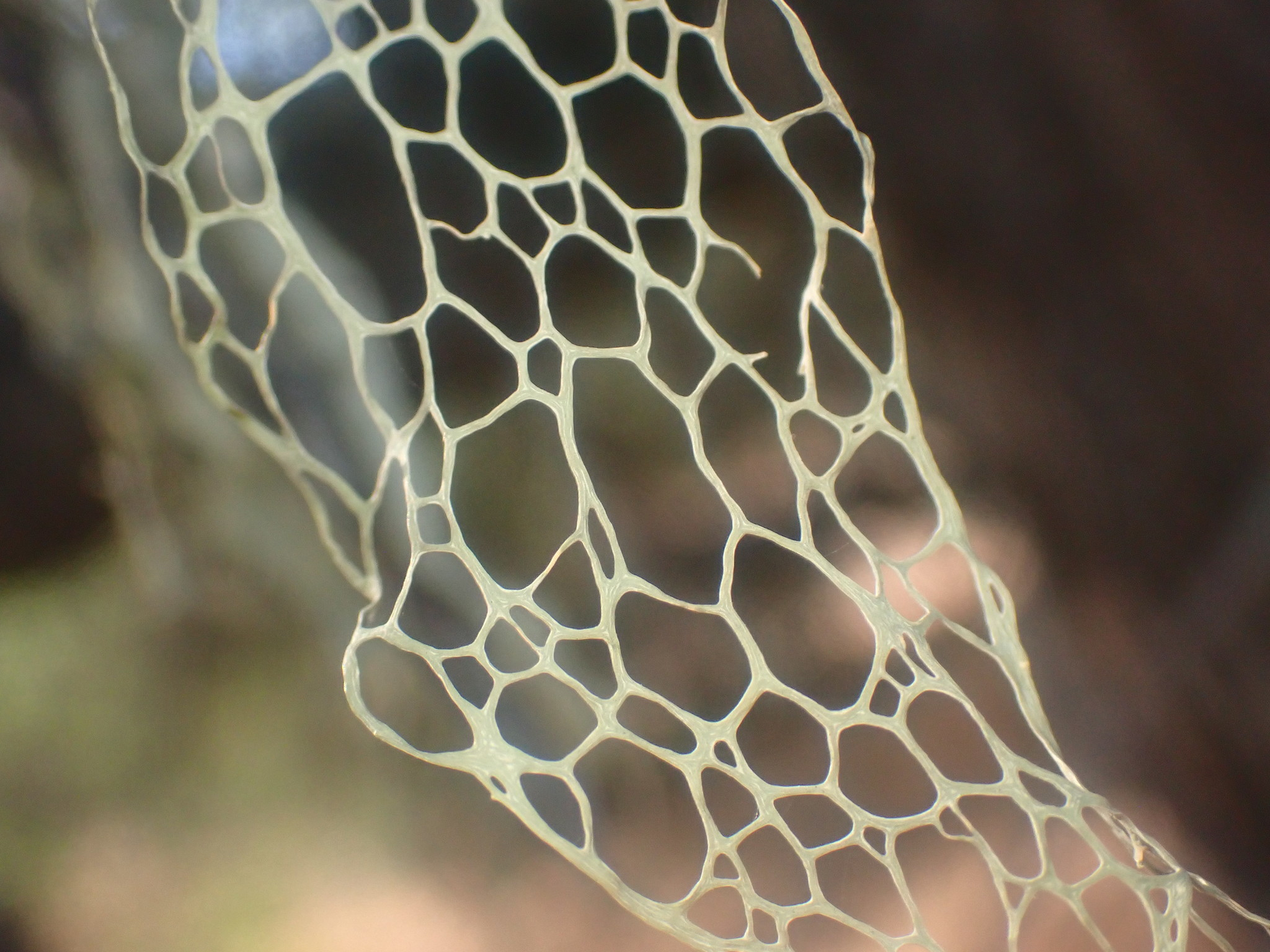
Lace lichen in Woodside, California

Ramalina menziesii is found from the Baja California of Mexico to the temperate rainforests of Alaska, with six distinct ecoregions. Throughout their distribution, the occupied habitat differs in relation to the distance from the coast. In Baja California, lace lichen is most common on shrubs in the coastal fog deserts and on cacti, shrubs and trees in the inland chaparral habitats. In coastal California, lace lichen is found in habitats dominated by coastal live oak, tan oak, California laurel, red alder, and willow. In the Californian inland, the habitats are dominated by oak savannas of valley oak, blue oak, and coastal live oak. The northern and southern Californian habitats are geographically separated from the coastal range. As you move towards the Pacific Northwest, lace lichen is found in temperate mixed coniferous forests of Sitka spruce, western hemlock, and some broad-leafed species. Moving inland in their northern distribution, lace lichen quickly disappear. The range of the lichen continues north along the Pacific Coast of British Columbia, extending to Alaska.

In the deciduous blue oak (Quercus douglasii) woodlands of central coastal California, Ramalina menziesii has an important role in the annual turnover of biomass. The standing biomass of this and other epiphytic lichens was determined to be 515 grams per tree, equivalent to 706 kilograms per hectare; of this, 94% is R. menziesii. Despite this area being much drier than those in other similar studies, R. menziesii was shown to contribute as much to biomass and nutrient turnover as other epiphytic lichens from wetter locales.

A study on Ramalina menziesii across its range from Baja California del Norte to the Queen Charlotte Islands revealed patterns of morphological variation influenced by environmental factors. Key findings include a correlation between the number of perforations in the lichen's net buds and both proximity to the coast and latitude, with coastal samples having fewer perforations and a decrease in perforations with increasing latitude, particularly noticeable north of central Oregon where samples are exclusively coastal. Additionally, the study found significant relationships between morphological variations and environmental factors such as NaCl concentration and annual temperature variation, although the distribution of different forms of R. menziesii and patterns of annual precipitation showed some alignment, the presence and form of R. menziesii did not correlate with the distribution of eight tree species that serve as its substrate.

== Photobiont ==
Lichen are a great example of a symbiotic interaction between a fungal body and an algal photobiont. The photobiont provides energy to the organism via photosynthesis, while the fungal body provides a habitat. 94% of the photobiont lineages of Ramalina menziesii are associated with Trebouxia decolorans, while the remainder are Trebouxia jamesii. While Ramalina menziesii only associates with one algal species, it has been found in association with six other fungal species.

Trebouxia decolorans shows significant genetic structure depending on the ecoregion, phorophyte species, and climate. This structure was likely shaped by geographic barriers or differences in climate and habitat. Within each ecoregion, specialization of T. decolorans to its specific phorophyte species was found. This allows for local adaptation and has an impact on the genetic structure of the population.

== Bioindicators ==
Lichen have long been used as bioindicators for atmospheric pollution because they derive much of their resources from the air. Many species are also sensitive to environmental change, making them accurate warning signs for pollution. A study of archived Ramalina menziesii specimens showed a history of lead contamination in California. Lead concentrations in lace lichen peaked in 1976 at 880 μg/g due to leaded gasoline emissions and have since decreased to 0.2–4.7 μg/g.

In recent years, Ramalina menziesii has bioaccumulated monomethylmercury (MMHg) from coastal marine atmospheric fog. High concentrations found in lace lichen are transmitted to the deer that consume them, and later to the apex predators that consume the deer—a process called biomagnification. Although fog-borne MMHg only accounts for a small percentage of atmospheric deposition, it may have a disproportionate impact leading to toxicological effects on Puma concolor in coastal California.

== Historical uses ==
Ramalina menziesii was first documented for its use by indigenous tribes of California. The Kawaiisu people reportedly used it for its magical properties. It would be placed in water to bring rain or placed in fire to repel thunder or lightning. The Kashaya Pomo people in Northern California used it as a sanitary material.

== See also ==
- List of Ramalina species
- Spanish moss, a plant of similar appearance and habit
