= Splash zone =

Offshore construction

In offshore construction, the splash zone is the transition from air to water when lowering heavy burdens into the sea. The overall efforts applied on the crane change dramatically when the load starts touching water, up to the point where it is completely submerged. Its buoyancy reduces the static mass that the crane has to support, but contact with the waves creates widely fluctuating dynamic forces.

Simulation of these changing efforts are necessary to correctly dimension cranes and lifting equipment. See for example DNV-RP-H103 (Det Norske Veritas recommended practices) for a mention of the piston effect created in the splash zone between two walls.

Special made Access Tools are often made for doing inspections or maintenance in the splash zone, typical down to 15 m depth. This zone is very difficult to access for divers or remotely operated vehicles (ROV's) due to waves and current. Rigging of equipment in this zone also needs special precautions due to the same. By using Remotely Operated Equipment (Robots) that holds on to the structures, work and inspections can be done. Earlier this Zone was looked at as unaccessible.
