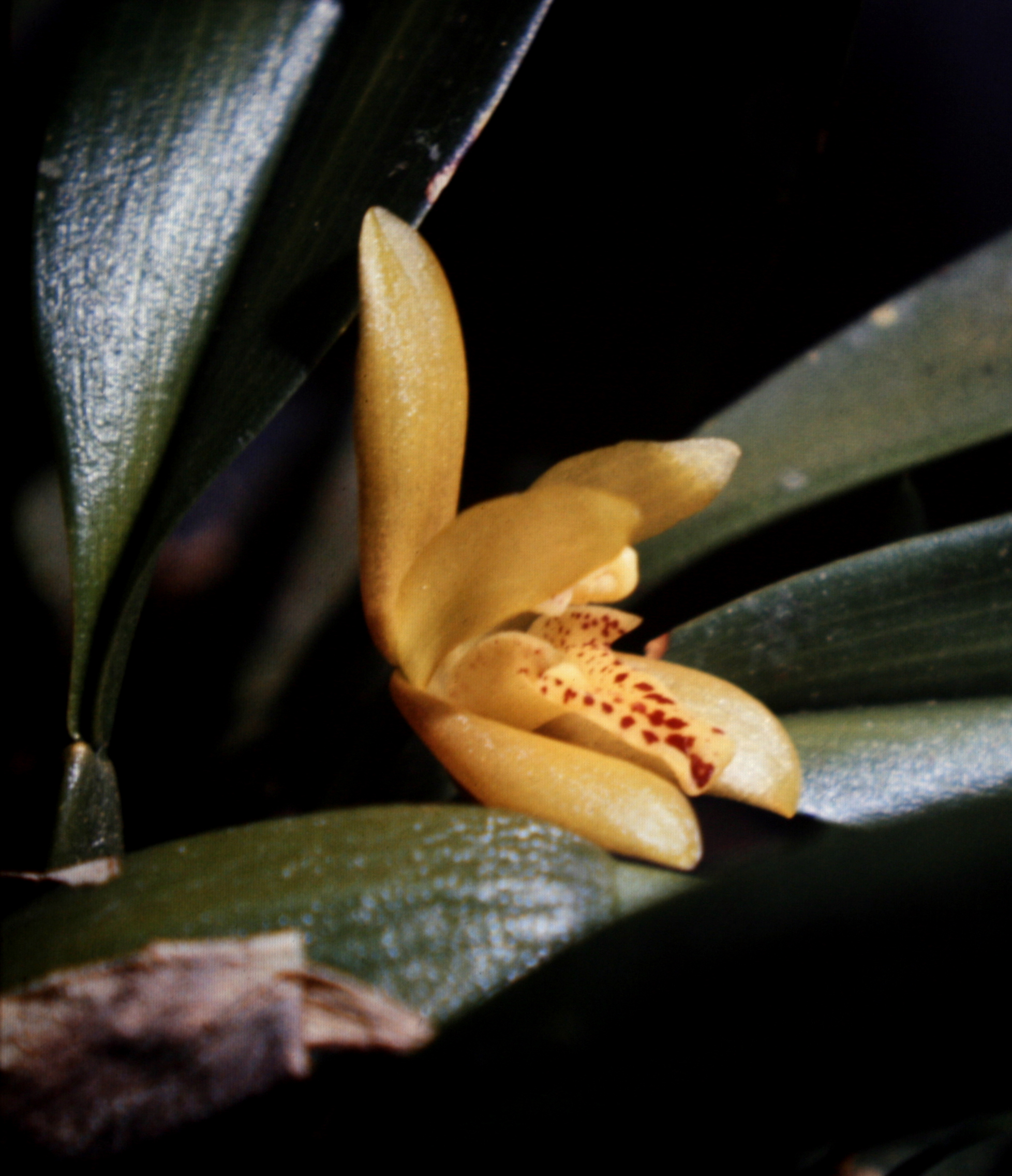

Scientific classification
- Kingdom: Plantae
- Clade: Tracheophytes
- Clade: Angiosperms
- Clade: Monocots
- Order: Asparagales
- Family: Orchidaceae
- Subfamily: Epidendroideae
- Genus: Maxillaria
- Species: M. rufescens

Binomial name
- Maxillaria rufescens Lindl.

Synonyms
- Maxillaria fuscata Lindl.; Maxillaria rugosa Scheidw.; Maxillaria articulata Klotzsch; Maxillaria vanillodora A.Rich. ex Rchb.f.; Maxillaria abelei Schltr.; Mormolyca rufescens (Lindl.) M.A.Blanco

= Maxillaria rufescens =

Species of orchid

Maxillaria rufescens, the light fox-red maxillaria, is a species of orchid native to Trinidad and the Amazon Basin in Colombia, Ecuador, Peru, Bolivia, Venezuela, The Guianas and Brazil. The plant grows at elevations of 200 to 2000 meters, and grows up to 1 1/4 inches (3 to 4 centimeters).
