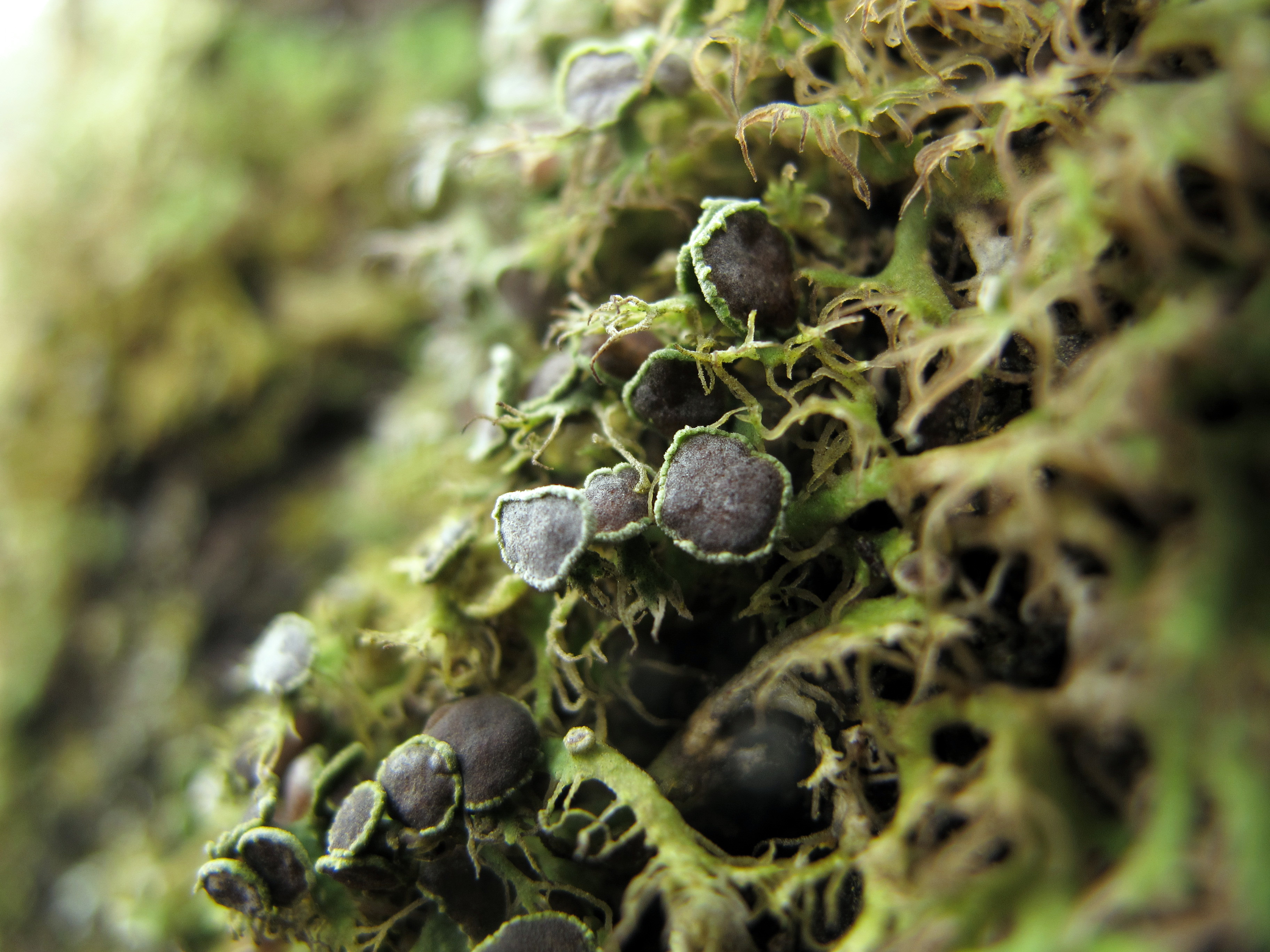
- Apothecia of Anaptychia ciliaris

Scientific classification
- Domain: Eukaryota
- Kingdom: Fungi
- Division: Ascomycota
- Class: Lecanoromycetes
- Order: Caliciales
- Family: Physciaceae
- Genus: Anaptychia; Körb. (1848)

Type species
- Anaptychia ciliaris (L.) Körb. (1853)

Species
- A. ciliaris A. crinalis A. desertorum A. elbursiana A. ethiopica A. isidiza A. nevadensis A. roemerioides

Synonyms
- Anaptychiomyces E.A.Thomas (1939); Hagenia Eschw. (1824); Imbricaria (Schreb.) Michx. (1803); Lichen sect. Imbricaria Schreb. (1791); Lichenoides Hoffm. (1789); Parmelia sect. Imbricaria (Schreb.) Fr. (1825); Tornabenia A.Massal. (1853)

= Anaptychia =

Genus of lichens

Anaptychia is a genus of lichen-forming fungi in the family Physciaceae. Anaptychia species are foliose (leafy) to fruticose (bushy) lichens. They have brown, thin-walled spores with a single septum, and a prosoplechtenchymatous upper cortex.

== Taxonomy ==
The genus was circumscribed by German lichenologist Gustav Wilhelm Körber in his 1848 work Grundriss der Kryptogamen-Kunde. In his 1962 monograph on the genus, Syo Kurokawa included 88 species. A few years later, Josef Poelt thought the genus should be divided into two genera – Anaptychia and Heterodermia – based largely on differences in spore structure. William Culberson supported this opinion, emphasizing the presence of distinct chemical characteristics between the two groups.

Some species of Anaptychia were transferred to the genus Kurokawia, newly circumscribed in 2021.

Other advancements in the taxonomy of Anaptychia have clarified the classification within section Protoanaptychia, a group originally proposed by Josef Poelt, primarily found in arid and semi-arid regions of the Northern Hemisphere. This section includes species such as A. desertorum, A. elbursiana, A. mereschkowskii, and A. roemeri, which are morphologically distinct from those found in moist temperate to arctic regions. The nomenclature and species identification within this section, particularly concerning A. desertorum and A. mereschkowskii, is now better understood. Kulakov (2003) rectified a long-standing confusion by recognising that the type specimen of Anaptychia desertorum, previously thought to be sorediate, is actually esorediate. He reinstated the name A. mereschkowskii for the sorediate species formerly identified as A. desertorum. Urbanavichus (2008) further resolved the taxonomy by associating the type specimen of A. desertorum with a fertile species, historically referred to as A. ulothricoides, granting A. desertorum nomenclatural priority. This clarification is relevant to North American literature, where the orthographic variant A. ulotrichoides has been mistakenly applied to a different species that reproduces primarily through fragmentation. These taxonomic updates, while significant, have been underreported in North American literature, possibly due to language barriers, as some of the research was published in Russian.

== Description ==
Anaptychia lichens have a thallus that ranges from leaf-like (foliose) to slightly shrubby (somewhat fruticose) in nature. These can be of small to medium size, with a degree of attachment that ranges from moderate to quite loose. In terms of colouration, they vary from a muted white or grey to a darker brown shade. The upper surface of the thallus can display a variety of features. In some species, it remains completely smooth, while others might have a light dusting known as pruina. Still, others might have a soft covering of fine, cortex-derived hairs or larger tapering hairs, especially closer to the edges of the lobes. There might also be the presence of marginal hair-like projections, referred to as cilia. The lichen's lower surface can be of a light hue which may darken over time, and it can range from having a sparse to a dense presence of root-like structures known as rhizines. These rhizines might be of a simple (unbranched) form, split into a few branches, or show intricate branching.

The uppermost protective layer, or cortex, displays a patterned cellular arrangement of outward-facing, thick-walled hyphae. In contrast, the lower cortex can either be absent or display a similar arrangement, but it might sometimes appear less structured and not distinctly separate from the inner fleshy layer, known as the medulla.

Anaptychia bears reproductive structures known as apothecia, which are encircled by a thallus-derived boundary. Inside these apothecia, there are sac-like structures that typically contain eight spores. These spores resemble those of the Physconia type, are brown, and are partitioned once, measuring in the range of 25–52 μm in length and 13–24 μm in width. Another kind of reproductive structure, the pycnidia, appear on the thallus surface and are darkened and sunken. The pycnidia contain spore-like conidia that are rod-shaped to slightly cylindrical, with sizes ranging between 3.5–6 μm in length and up to 6.1 μm in width.

== Species ==
As of June 2024, Species Fungorum accepts five species of Anaptychia. The fungal classification compilation "Outline of Fungi and fungus-like taxa – 2021" suggests there are 15 species in the genus.

- Anaptychia ciliaris (L.) Körb. ex A.Massal. (1853)
- Anaptychia crinalis (Schleich. ex Schaer.) Vězda ex J.Nowak (1993)
- Anaptychia desertorum (Rupr.) Poelt (1969)
- Anaptychia elbursiana (Szatala) Poelt (1966)
- Anaptychia ethiopica Swinscow & Krog (1976)
- Anaptychia isidiza Kurok. (1962)
- Anaptychia nevadensis Hollinger, Noell & S.D.Leav. (2022) – western North America
- Anaptychia roemeri Poelt (1968)
- Anaptychia roemerioides Hollinger, Noell & S.D.Leav. (2022) – western North America
