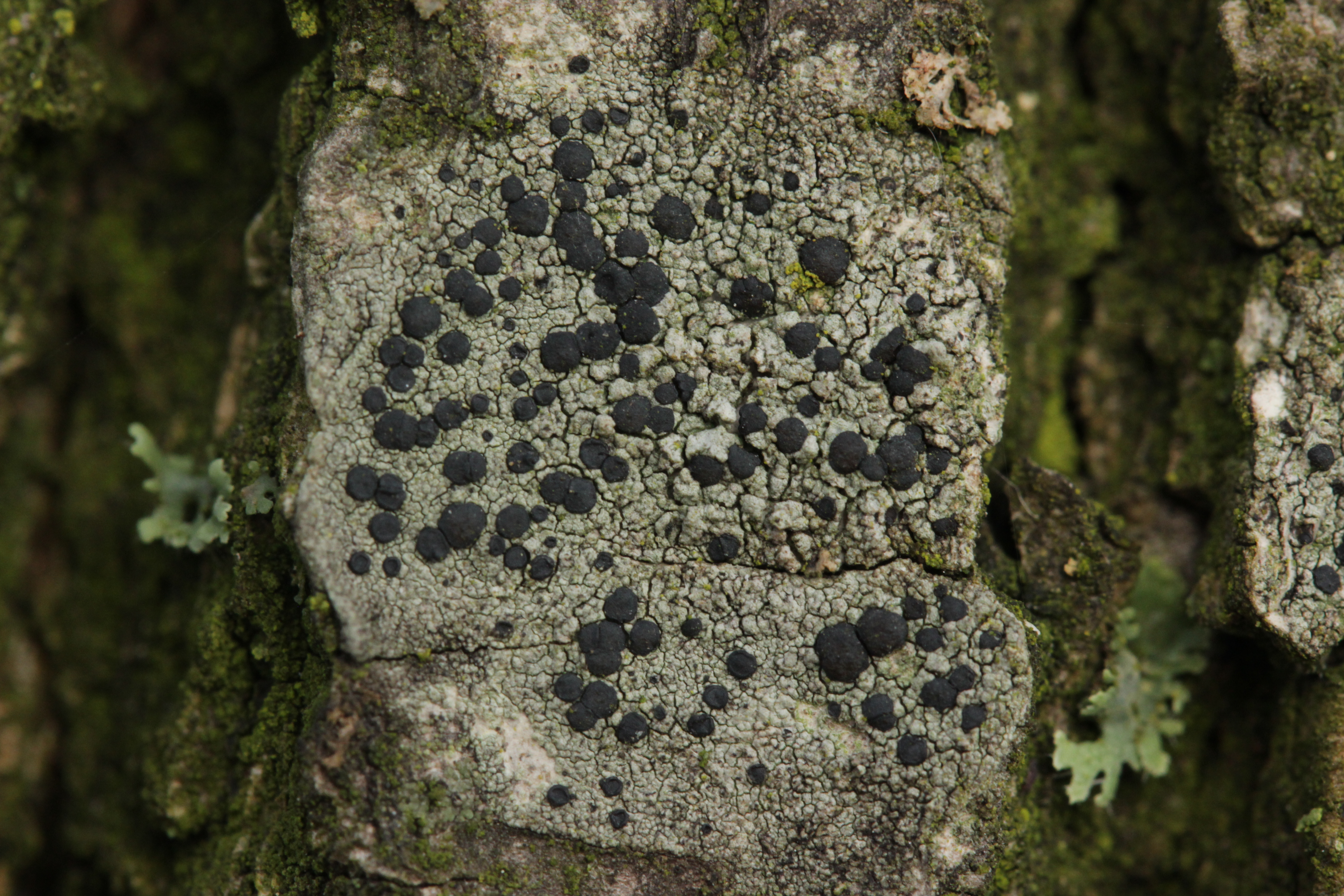

Conservation status
- Secure (NatureServe)

Scientific classification
- Domain: Eukaryota
- Kingdom: Fungi
- Division: Ascomycota
- Class: Lecanoromycetes
- Order: Caliciales
- Family: Caliciaceae
- Genus: Amandinea
- Species: A. punctata

Binomial name
- Amandinea punctata (Hoffm.) Coppins & Scheid. (1993)

Synonyms
- Verrucaria punctata Hoffm. (1796)

= Amandinea punctata =

Species of lichen

Amandinea punctata (tiny button lichen) is a crustose brown to gray lichen that grows on wood and rock around the world. It grows on, not in the wood (epiphytic). It prefers bark that is acidic. In California, it is among the most common crustose lichens occurring on trees. Sometimes its thallus is absent, and branches may be covered in its lecideine apothecia. Because of its tolerance of low humidity, it is one of the few epiphytic lichens growing on trees in California deserts, where it commonly grows on the old, dry wood of junipers, and sometimes fallen pinyon pines and oaks, or on their dead branches. Compared to other lichens, it is tolerant of air pollutants and other toxins such as NO_{2} and SO_{2}.
