= Phorophyte =

Plant on which epiphytes grow

In botany, phorophytes are plants on which epiphytes grow. The term is composed of phoro, meaning bearer or carrier and phyte, meaning plant.

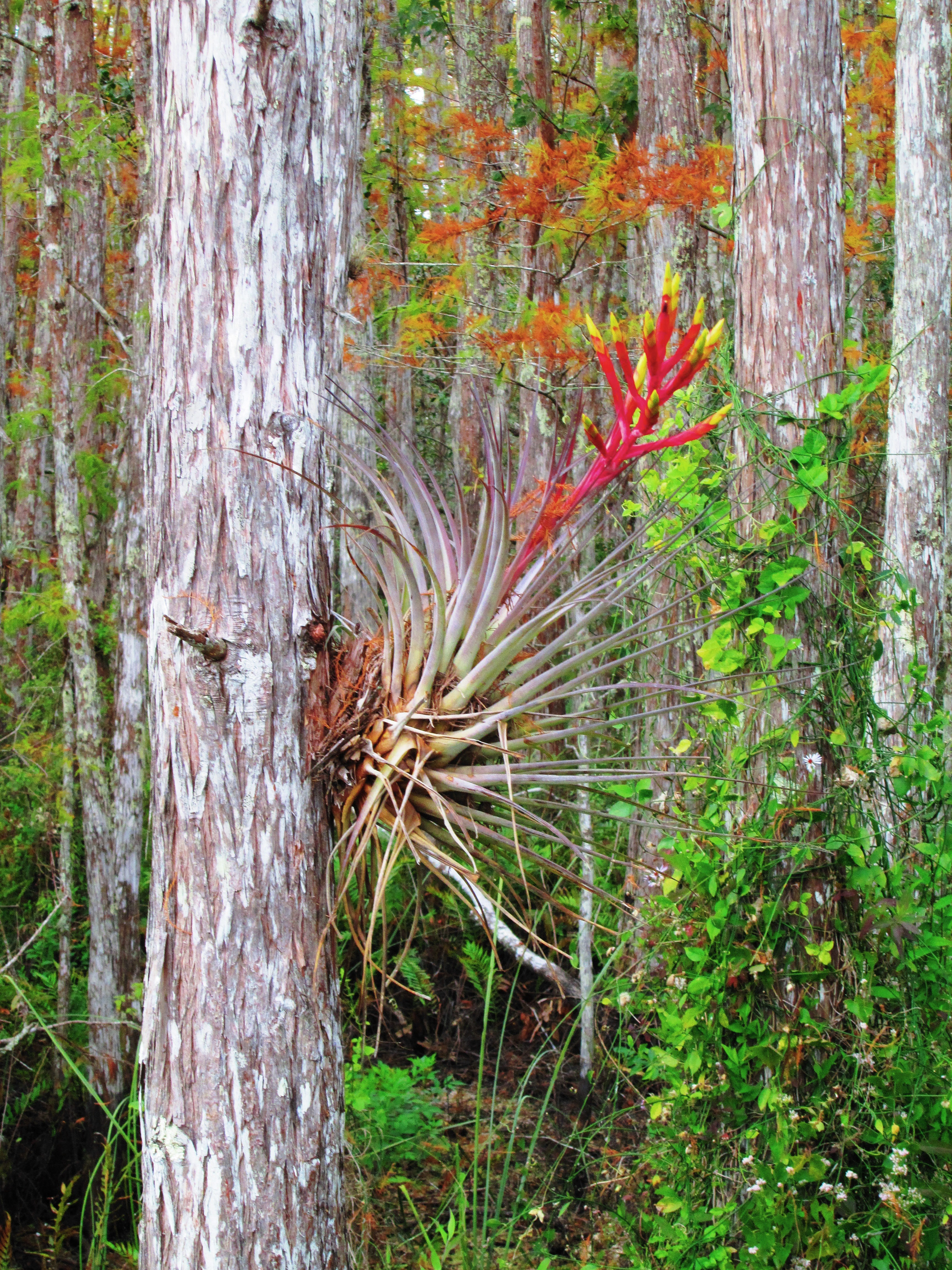
An epiphyte growing on the phorophyte bald cypress (Taxodium distichum)

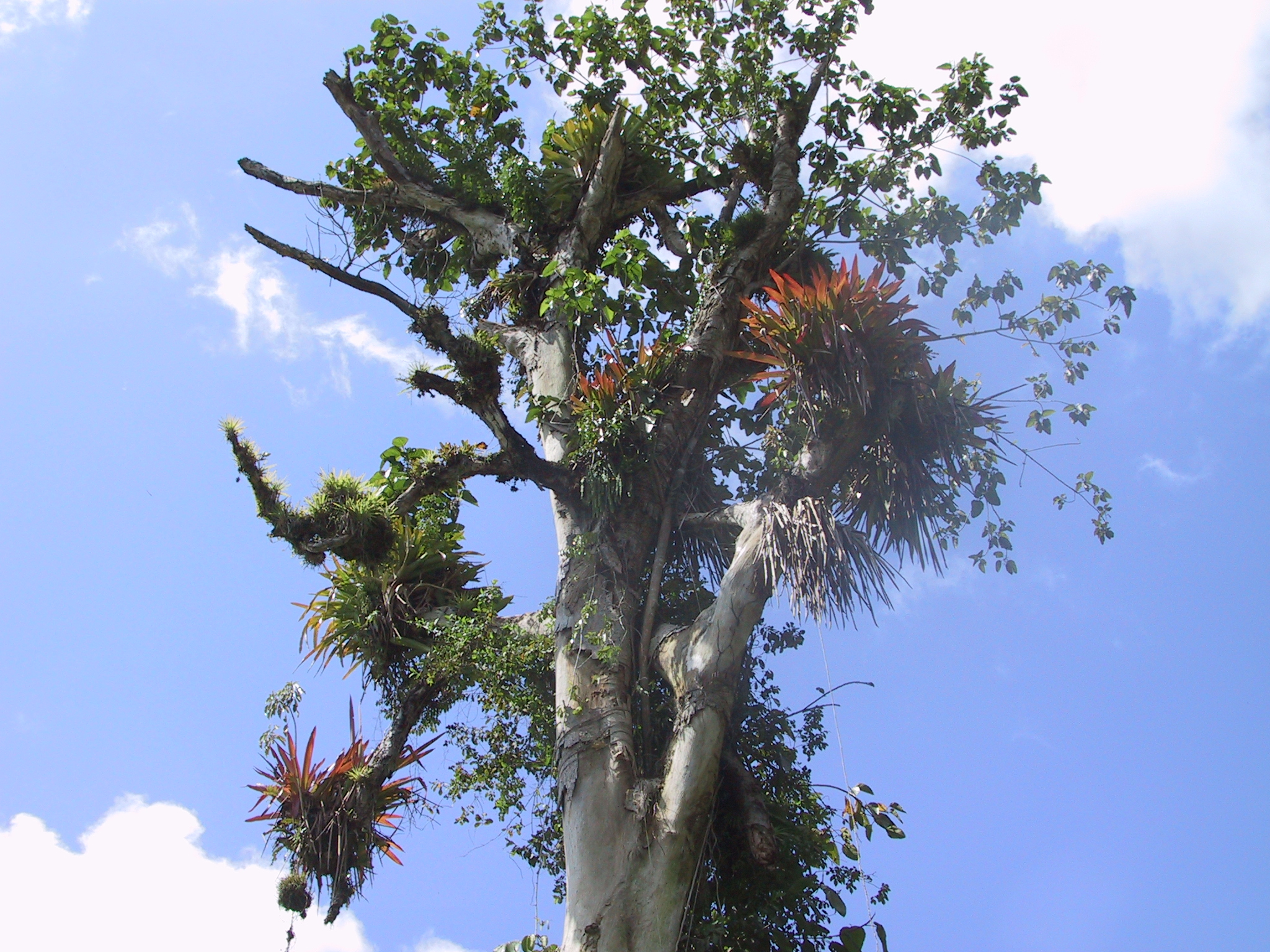
Phorophytic tree densely covered in epiphytic bromeliads

== Commensalistic interactions ==
The epiphytes benefit from the habitats provided, but the phorophyte is unaffected. In other words, the obligate epiphytes utilize phorophytes as habitats, without parasitizing them.

== Phorophyte specificity ==
Different phorophytes provide different conditions to the plants which grow on their surface. The bark pH, degree of bark shedding, the presence of milk sap and the density and size of bark lenticels influence the occurrence of epiphytes. Bark ornamentations affect the establishment of seeds and the chemical composition of the bark may be inhibiting germination. Some epiphytic orchids tend to grow on phorophytes with rough bark. Conservation efforts for orchids need to account for the conservation of phorophytes as well.
