= List of fungi of South Africa – L =

This is an alphabetical list of the fungal taxa as recorded from South Africa. Currently accepted names have been appended.

== La ==
Order: Laboulbeniales

Family: Laboulbeniaceae

Genus: Laboulbenia

- Laboulbenia anomala Thaxt.
- Laboulbenia bilabiata Thaxt.
- Laboulbenia dryptae Thaxt.

Genus: Laccaria

- Laccaria laccata Berk. & Br.

Genus: Lacellina

- Lacellina graminicola Petch.

Genus: Lachnea

- Lachnea capensis v.d.Byl.
- Lachnea capensis Lloyd
- Lachnea hemispherica Gill.
- Lachnea lusatiae Cooke

Genus: Lachnocladium

- Lachnocladium cristatum Lloyd
- Lachnocladium furcellatum Lev.
- Lachnocladium semivestitum Berk. & Curt.
- Lachnocladium zenkeri P.Henn.

Genus: Lactarium

- Lactarium deliciosus S.F.Gray
- Lactarium piperatus S.F.Gray
- Lactarium scrobiculatus Fr.

Genus: Lagenula

- Lagenula fructicola Amaud.

Genus: Lamprospora

- Lamprospora leiocarpa Seaver.

Genus: Lanopila

- Lanopila capensis Lloyd
- Lanopila radloffiana Verw.
- Lanopila wahlbergii Fr.

Genus: Laschia

- Laschia auriscalpium Mont.
- Laschia cucullata Bres.
- Laschia duthiei Lloyd
- Laschia friesiana P.Henn.
- Laschia rubella Sacc.
- Laschia tenerrima Kalchbr.
- Laschia thwaitesii Berk. & Br.
- Laschia sp.

Genus: Lasiobolus

- Lasiobolus equinus Karst.

Genus: Lasiosphaeria

- Lasiosphaeria capensis Kalchbr. & Cooke
- Lasiosphaeria hispida Fuck.

Genus: Lasmeniella

- Lasmeniella globulifera Petrak & Syd.
- Lasmeniella pterocarpi Petrak.

Genus: Laternea

- Laternea angolensis Welw. & Curr.

== Le ==
Family: Lecanactidaceae

Genus: Lecanactis (Lichens)

- Lecanactis bullata Zahlbr.
- Lecanactis develans Nyl.
- Lecanactis diversa Nyl.
- Lecanactis emersa Stizenb.
- Lecanactis ulcerata Zahlbr.

Genus: Lecania (Lichens)

- Lecania arenaria Flagey
- Lecania cyrtella Th.Fr.
- Lecania fructuosa Zahlbr.
- Lecania punicea Müll.Arg.

Genus: Lecanora (Lichens)

- Lecanora aequata Stizenb.
- Lecanora albella Ach.
- Lecanora albella f. angulosa Nyl.
- Lecanora albospersa Stizenb.
- Lecanora allophana Rohl.
- Lecanora allophana var. glabrata Steiner.
- Lecanora amphidoxa Stizenb.
- Lecanora angulosa Ach.
- Lecanora arenaria Nyl.
- Lecanora armstrongiae Stizenb.
- Lecanora asperella Nyl.
- Lecanora aspersa Stizenb.
- Lecanora atra Ach.
- Lecanora atra var. americana Fee.
- Lecanora atraeformis Vain.
- Lecanora atrorimata Nyl.
- Lecanora atrosulphurea Ach.
- Lecanora atrosulphurea f. leptococca Stizenb.
- Lecanora atrosulphurea f. livens Stizenb.
- Lecanora aurantiaca Flotow.
- Lecanora aurantiaca var. erythrella Nyl.
- Lecanora aurantiaca var. fulva Nyl.
- Lecanora aurantiaca var. placidium Stizenb.
- Lecanora aureola Stirt.
- Lecanora badia (Hoffm.) Ach. (1810) var. cinerascens Flot. (1849), accepted as Protoparmelia badia (Hoffm.) Hafellner (1984)
- Lecanora benguellensis Nyl.
- Lecanora bicincta Ram.
- Lecanora blanda Nyl.
- Lecanora bogotana Nyl.
- Lecanora breuteliana Massal.
- Lecanora bylii Vain.
- Lecanora bylii Zahlbr.
- Lecanora caesiopallens Vain.
- Lecanora caesiorubella Ach.
- Lecanora cancriformis Vain.
- Lecanora candidata Stizenb.
- Lecanora cameoflava Müll.Arg.
- Lecanora carpinea Vain.
- Lecanora cateileoides Vain.
- Lecanora cervina Ach.
- Lecanora chlarona Nyl.
- Lecanora chlarona f. geographica Nyl.
- Lecanora chlarona f. pinastri Cromb.
- Lecanora chlarona var. bogotana Vain.
- Lecanora chlarotera Nyl.
- Lecanora chondroplaca Zahlbr.
- Lecanora cinefacta Stizenb.
- Lecanora cinerea Rohl.
- Lecanora cinereocamea Stizenb.
- Lecanora cinnabarina Ach.
- Lecanora cinnabarina var. haematodes Stizenb.
- Lecanora cinnabarina var. pallidior Stizenb.
- Lecanora cinnabarina var. opaca Stizenb.
- Lecanora cinnabarina var. perminiata Nyl.
- Lecanora cinnabariza Nyl.
- Lecanora clavulus Stizenb.
- Lecanora coarctata Ach.
- Lecanora coarctata f. cotaria Ach.
- Lecanora coarctata f. fulgiana Zahlbr.
- Lecanora coarctata var. argilliseda Duf.
- Lecanora coarctata var. fossulans Stizenb.
- Lecanora coccinella Stizenb.
- Lecanora coilocarpa Nyl.
- Lecanora confluens Stizenb.
- Lecanora confragulosa Nyl.
- Lecanora conspersa Stizenb.
- Lecanora constans Nyl.
- Lecanora crassildbra Müll.Arg.
- Lecanora cruda Stizenb.
- Lecanora deminuta Stizenb.
- Lecanora deminutula Stizenb.
- Lecanora detecta Stizenb.
- Lecanora diffusilis Nyl.
- Lecanora dispersa Rohl. f. nana Vain.
- Lecanora dispersa f. testacea Vain.
- Lecanora domingensis Ach.
- Lecanora elaeophaea Nyl.
- Lecanora elapheia Stizenb.
- Lecanora elegantissima Nyl.
- Lecanora epichlora Vain.
- Lecanora erythrella Ach.
- Lecanora erythroleuca var. subcerina Nyl.
- Lecanora eudoxa Stizenb.
- Lecanora euelpis Stizenb.
- Lecanora exigua Rohl.
- Lecanora expallens Ach.
- Lecanora expallens var. lutescens Nyl.
- Lecanora fenzliana Stizenb.
- Lecanora ferruginea Link.
- Lecanora ferruginea f. erysibe Stizenb.
- Lecanora fibrosa Stizenb.
- Lecanora ficta Stizenb.
- Lecanora flava Stizenb.
- Lecanora flavocrea Nyl.
- Lecanora flavorubens Stizenb.
- Lecanora flavovirens Fee.
- Lecanora flexuosa Stizenb.
- Lecanora fructuosa Stizenb.
- Lecanora frustulosa Ach.
- Lecanora galactiniza Nyl.
- Lecanora gibbosa Nyl. var. subdepressa Nyl.
- Lecanora glaucolivescens Nyl.
- Lecanora glaucoma Ach.
- Lecanora granulosa Wedd.
- Lecanora helva Stizenb.
- Lecanora homaloplaca Nyl.
- Lecanora hufferiana Stizenb.
- Lecanora hypocrocina Nyl.
- Lecanora imponens Stizenb.
- Lecanora impressa Zahlbr.
- Lecanora labiosa Stizenb.
- Lecanora laciniosa Nyl.
- Lecanora lamprocheila Nyl.
- Lecanora leprosa Fee.
- Lecanora leptoplaca Zahlbr.
- Lecanora leucoxantha Müll.Arg.
- Lecanora leueoxantha Stizenb.
- Lecanora leucoxanthalla Stizenb.
- Lecanora lithagogo Nyl.
- Lecanora lugens Stizenb.
- Lecanora massula Stizenb.
- Lecanora microlepida Stizenb.
- Lecanora microps Stizenb.
- Lecanora murorum Ach.
- Lecanora murorum var. pusilla Wedd.
- Lecanora nidulans Stizenb.
- Lecanora nubila Stizenb.
- Lecanora obvirescens Stizenb.
- Lecanora ochracea Nyl. var. parvula Stizenb.
- Lecanora odoardi Stizenb.
- Lecanora oveina Ach.
- Lecanora orichalcea Stizenb.
- Lecanora ostracoderma Ach.
- Lecanora pallescens Rohl.
- Lecanora pallida Rabenh.
- Lecanora parella Ach.
- Lecanora perexigua Stiz.
- Lecanora phlogina Nyl.
- Lecanora placodina Zahlbr.
- Lecanora poliotera Nyl.
- Lecanora polytypa Vain.
- Lecanora porinoides Stizenb.
- Lecanora praemicans Nyl.
- Lecanora prosecha Ach. var. homaloplaca Vain.
- Lecanora psaromela Nyl.
- Lecanora punicea Ach.
- Lecanora punicea var. brevicula Stizenb.
- Lecanora punicea var. collata Stirt.
- Lecanora pyracea Nyl. f. picta Nyl.
- Lecanora pyracea f. pyrithroma Nyl.
- Lecanora pyracea var. picta Stizenb.
- Lecanora pyropoecila Nyl.
- Lecanora rehmannii Stizenb.
- Lecanora robiginans Stizenb.
- Lecanora roboris Nyl.
- Lecanora rupicola Zahlbr.
- Lecanora scorigena Nyl.
- Lecanora scoriophila Stizenb.
- Lecanora seductrir Stizenb.
- Lecanora smaragdula Nyl.
- Lecanora sophodes Nyl.
- Lecanora sophodes var. atroalbida Nyl.
- Lecanora sophodes var. roboris Duf.
- Lecanora sphinctrina Nyl.
- Lecanora subcarnea Ach.
- Lecanora subcarnosa Ach.
- Lecanora subdepressa Nyl.
- Lecanora subfulgescens Nyl.
- Lecanora subfusca Ach.
- Lecanora subfusca var. allophana Ach.
- Lecanora subfusca var. campestris Rabenh.
- Lecanora subfusca var. cinereocarnea Müll.Arg.
- Lecanora subfusca var. glabrata Sch.
- Lecanora subfusca var. subcrenulata Nyl.
- Lecanora subfusca var. subgranulata Nyl.
- Lecanora subgranulata Nyl.
- Lecanora subpunicea Stizenb.
- Lecanora subsoluta Nyl.
- Lecanora subunicolor Nyl.
- Lecanora sylvestris Stizenb.
- Lecanora teichophiloides Stizenb.
- Lecanora tersa Nyl.
- Lecanora thaeodes Stizenb.
- Lecanora thiocheila Stizenb.
- Lecanora varia Ach.
- Lecanora vascesia Stizenb.
- Lecanora vincentina Nyl.
- Lecanora vitellina Ach.
- Lecanora vulpina Nyl.
- Lecanora xanthophana Nyl.
- Lecanora zambesica Stizenb.

Family: Lecanoraceae (Lichens)

Genus: Lecidea (Lichens)

- Lecidea acervata Stizenb.
- Lecidea achristella Vain.
- Lecidea aemula Stizenb.
- Lecidea aeneola Vain. var. fuscoatrata Zahlbr.
- Lecidea aethalea Nyl.
- Lecidea aethaloessa Stizenb.
- Lecidea affine Merrill.
- Lecidea afra Stizenb.
- Lecidea africana Tuck.
- Lecidea albinea Stizenb.
- Lecidea albocoerulescens Arn.
- Lecidea albocoerulescens var. flavocoerulescens Schaer.
- Lecidea albula Nyl.
- Lecidea ambusta Stizenb.
- Lecidea anatalodia Krempelb.
- Lecidea angolensis Müll.Arg.
- Lecidea anomala Ach.
- Lecidea anteposita Nyl.
- Lecidea aporetica Stizenb.
- Lecidea armstrongiae Jones.
- Lecidea atroalha Ach.
- Lecidea atroalbella Nyl.
- Lecidea alrovirens Ach.
- Lecidea aurantiaca Ach.
- Lecidea aureola Tuck.
- Lecidea aurigera Fee.
- Lecidea breviuscula Nyl.
- Lecidea brugierae Vain.
- Lecidea bumamma Nyl.
- Lecidea buxea Stiz.
- Lecidea caesiopallida Nyl.
- Lecidea caledonica Zahlbr.
- Lecidea callaina Stizenb.
- Lecidea capensis Zahlbr.
- Lecidea capreolina Stizenb.
- Lecidea carneola Ach.
- Lecidea caruncula Stizenb.
- Lecidea caudata Nyl.
- Lecidea chalybeia Borr.
- Lecidea chlorophaeata Nyl.
- Lecidea ckloropoliza Nyl.
- Lecidea chlorotica Nyl.
- Lecidea cinnamomea Stizenb.
- Lecidea coccinella Hue.
- Lecidea coeruleata Stizenb.
- Lecidea confluens Hue.
- Lecidea contingens Nyl.
- Lecidea coroniformis Krempelh.
- Lecidea crassa Stizenb.
- Lecidea crenata Stizenb.
- Lecidea crenata var. coroniformis Zahlbr.
- Lecidea crenata var. speirea Stizenb.
- Lecidea crustulata Sprengl.
- Lecidea cyanocentra Nyl.
- Lecidea cyrtocheila Stizenb.
- Lecidea deceptoria Nyl.
- Lecidea decipiens Ach.
- Lecidea decrustulosa Vain.
- Lecidea disciformis Nyl.
- Lecidea disciformis var. sanguinea Stizenb.
- Lecidea discolor Stizenb.
- Lecidea dispersula Stizenb.
- Lecidea distrata Nyl.
- Lecidea domingensis Nyl.
- Lecidea domingensis var.inexplicata Nyl.
- Lecidea elaeochroma Ach.
- Lecidea elaeochroma f. flavicans Th.Fr.
- Lecidea elaeochroma f. geographica Zahlbr.
- Lecidea elaeochroma var. hyalina Zahlbr.
- Lecidea endoleuca Nyl.
- Lecidea endoleucella Stizenb.
- Lecidea enteroleuca Ach.
- Lecidea enteroleuca var. geographica Bagl.
- Lecidea elginensis Zahlbr.
- Lecidea epichromatica Zahlbr.
- Lecidea esuriens Zahlbr.
- Lecidea euelpis Hue.
- Lecidea exigua Chaub.
- Lecidea exiguella Vain.
- Lecidea finckei Zahlbr.
- Lecidea flavocrocea Nyl.
- Lecidea fucina Stizenb.
- Lecidea fumosa Ach.
- Lecidea fumosa var. mosigii Ach.
- Lecidea fuscoatra Ach.
- Lecidea fuscoatrata Nyl.
- Lecidea fuscorubella Rohl.
- Lecidea fuscorubescens Nyl.
- Lecidea fuscolutea Ach.
- Lecidea fuscotabulata Stizenb.
- Lecidea geina Stizenb.
- Lecidea geographica Rebent.
- Lecidea geographica f. intermedia Stizenb.
- Lecidea glebaria Stizenb.
- Lecidea glencairnensis Zahlbr.
- Lecidea glomerulosa Steud.
- Lecidea goniophila Floerke.
- Lecidea gouritzensis Vain.
- Lecidea graniferna Wain.
- Lecidea granulosula Nyl.
- Lecidea grisella Floerke f. mosigii Zahlbr.
- Lecidea griseofusciuscula Vain.
- Lecidea guamensis Vain.
- Lecidea halonia Ach.
- Lecidea hereroensis Zahlbr.
- Lecidea hereroensis f. genuina Zahlbr.
- Lecidea hereroensis f. depauperata Zahlbr.
- Lecidea howickensis Vain.
- Lecidea hysbergensis Vain.
- Lecidea icmadophila Ach.
- Lecidea imponens Hue.
- Lecidea impressa Krempelh.
- Lecidea inconsequens Nyl.
- Lecidea inconveniens Nyl.
- Lecidea incretata Stizenb.
- Lecidea incuriosa Nyl.
- Lecidea inquilina Stizenb.
- Lecidea inscripta Stizenb.
- Lecidea insculpta Flotow.
- Lecidea insculpta f. oxydata Flotow.
- Lecidea intermedia Nyl.
- Lecidea intermixta f. cyanocentra Nyl.
- Lecidea italica Wedd.
- Lecidea italica var. debanensis Stizenb.
- Lecidea italica var. recobarina Stizenb.
- Lecidea lactaria Stizenb.
- Lecidea lactea Floerke.
- Lecidea lactens Stizenb.
- Lecidea langbaanensis Vain.
- Lecidea laurocerasi Nyl. var. amylothelia Wain
- Lecidea lenticularis var. nigroclavata Stizenb.
- Lecidea leptobola Nyl.
- Lecidea leucina Stizenb.
- Lecidea leucostephana Stizenb.
- Lecidea leucoxantha Spreng.
- Lecidea lithagogo Wain.
- Lecidea lutata Stizenb.
- Lecidea lutea Tayl.
- Lecidea luteola Ach.
- Lecidea luteola var. chlorotica Ach.
- Lecidea luteola f. conspondens Nyl.
- Lecidea massula Hue.
- Lecidea medialis Tuck.
- Lecidea meiospora Nyl.
- Lecidea melampepla Tuck.
- Lecidea melanthina Stizenb.
- Lecidea millegrana Nyl.
- Lecidea minutula Nyl.
- Lecidea montaqnei Flotow.
- Lecidea mortualis Stizenb.
- Lecidea mossamedana Wain.
- Lecidea mutabilis Fee.
- Lecidea myriocarpa Rohl.
- Lecidea myriocarpa f. marcidula Nyl.
- Lecidea nanosperma Stizenb.
- Lecidea natalensis Nyl.
- Lecidea nesiotis Stizenb.
- Lecidea nigrella Stizenb.
- Lecidea nigropallida Nyl.
- Lecidea nitidula Fr.
- Lecidea norrlinii Lamy.
- Lecidea obumbrata Nvl.
- Lecidea ocellata Floerke.
- Lecidea ochriodea Stizenb.
- Lecidea ochroplaca Zahlbr. var. intermedia Zahlbr.
- Lecidea ochroplaca var. leprosa Zahlbr.
- Lecidea ochroplaca var. polita Zahlbr.
- Lecidea ochroxantha Nyl. f. aethiopica Stizenb.
- Lecidea oligocheila Zahlbr.
- Lecidea olivacea Massal.
- Lecidea olivacea var. ambigua Lettau.
- Lecidea olivacea Stizenb.
- Lecidea opacata Stizenb.
- Lecidea opalina Stizenb.
- Lecidea orbiculata Stizenb.
- Lecidea orichalcea Hue.
- Lecidea owaniana Müll.Arg.
- Lecidea pachnodes Stizenb.
- Lecidea pachycarpa Fr.
- Lecidea pallidonigra Ach.
- Lecidea palmeti Stizenb.
- Lecidea pantherina Ach.
- Lecidea parasema Ach.
- Lecidea parasema var. areolata Duf.
- Lecidea parasema var. areolata Merrill.
- Lecidea parasema var. atropurpurea Flotow.
- Lecidea parasema var. elaeochroma Ach.
- Lecidea parasema var. exigua Nyl.
- Lecidea paraspeirea Stizenb.
- Lecidea parmeliarum Sommerf.
- Lecidea parvifolia Pers.
- Lecidea parvifolia var. fibrillifera Nyl.
- Lecidea parvifoliella Nyl.
- Lecidea patellaria Stizenb.
- Lecidea peltasta Stirt.
- Lecidea peltoloma Müll.Arg.
- Lecidea peltulidea Stirt.
- Lecidea perforans Stizenb.
- Lecidea perigrapta Stizenb.
- Lecidea permodica Stizenb.
- Lecidea phalerata Stizenb.
- Lecidea placodina Nyl.
- Lecidea porphyrea Mey.
- Lecidea praelata Stizenb.
- Lecidea praemicans Hue.
- Lecidea procellarum Stizenb.
- Lecidea promontorii Zahlbr.
- Lecidea proposita Nyl.
- Lecidea punieea Hue.
- Lecidea quartzina Stizenb.
- Lecidea remota Vain.
- Lecidea rhynsdorpensis Zahlbr.
- Lecidea rhyparoleuca Stizenb.
- Lecidea rivulosa Ach.
- Lecidea rudis Stizenb.
- Lecidea rufata Stizenb.
- Lecidea russula Ach.
- Lecidea rusticorum Stizenb.
- Lecidea sabuletorum Ach.
- Lecidea santensis Tuck.
- Lecidea schinziana Stizenb.
- Lecidea speirea Ach.
- Lecidea spuria Schaer.
- Lecidea spuria var. insulans Stizenb.
- Lecidea squamifera Stizenb.
- Lecidea squamifera var. Bylii Zahlbr.
- Lecidea stellans Stizenb.
- Lecidea stellenboschiana Vain.
- Lecidea stellulata Tayl.
- Lecidea stellulata f. albosparsa Stizenb.
- Lecidea stellulata f. hybrida Stizenb.
- Lecidea stellulata f. murina Stizenb.
- Lecidea stenospora Nyl. var. acutata Stizenb.
- Lecidea stictella Stirt.
- Lecidea stupparia Stizenb.
- Lecidea styloumena Stirt.
- Lecidea subalbicans Nyl.
- Lecidea subalbula Nyl.
- Lecidea subattingens Merrill.
- Lecidea subceresina Zahlbr.
- Lecidea subdisciformis Leight.
- Lecidea subexigua Vain.
- Lecidea subexiguella Vain.
- Lecidea subfuscata Nyl.
- Lecidea subinquinans Nyl.
- Lecidea sublucida Stizenb.
- Lecidea subluteola Nyl.
- Lecidea subspadicea Stizenb.
- Lecidea subsquamifera Zahlbr.
- Lecidea subrussula Steiner.
- Lecidea substylosa Zahlbr.
- Lecidea subtristis Nyl.
- Lecidea sulfurosula Stizenb.
- Lecidea tenebrieosa Nyl.
- Lecidea terrena Nyl.
- Lecidea thaleriza Stirt.
- Lecidea theichroa Vain.
- Lecidea theiphoriodes Vain.
- Lecidea tragorum Zahlbr.
- Lecidea transvaalica Stizenb.
- Lecidea trichiliae Zahlbr.
- Lecidea trifaria Stizenb.
- Lecidea triphragmia Nyl.
- Lecidea tuberculosa Fee.
- Lecidea tuberculosa f. geotropa Stizenb.
- Lecidea valida Stizenb.
- Lecidea vasquesia Hue.
- Lecidea vemalis Ach.
- Lecidea vernalis S.F.Gray.
- Lecidea versicolor Nyl.
- Lecidea vesicularis Ach.
- Lecidea vestita Nyl.
- Lecidea viridans Lamy var. nigrella Steiner.
- Lecidea viridiatra Stizenb.
- Lecidea volvarioides Stizenb.
- Lecidea vorticosa Korb.
- Lecidea vulgata Zahlbr.
- Lecidea vulpina Tuck.
- Lecidea woodii Stizenb.
- Lecidea zeyheri Zahlbr.

Family: Lecideaceae(lichens)

Genus: Lecidella(lichens)

- Lecidella nigrella Massal.

Genus: Lecideola

- Lecideola flavescens Massal.

Genus: Lembosia

- Lembosia congesta Wint.
- Lembosia durbana v.d.Byl.
- Lembosia natalensis Doidge
- Lembosia phillipsii Doidge
- Lembosia piriensis Doidge
- Lembosia radiata Doidge
- Lembosia wageri Doidge

Genus: Lembosina

- Lembosina Rawsoniae Doidge

Genus: Lembosiopsis

- Lembosiopsis eucalyptina Petrak & Syd.

Genus: Lentinus

- Lentinus albidus Berk.
- Lentinus capronatus Berk.
- Lentinus cirrosus Fr.
- Lentinus dactyliophorus Lev.
- Lentinus fastuosus Kalchbr. & MacOwan
- Lentinus flabelliformis Fr.
- Lentinus hyracinus Kalchbr.
- Lentinus lecomtei Fr.
- Lentinus lepideus Fr.
- Lentinus miserculus Kalchbr.
- Lentinus murrayi Kalchbr. & MacOwan.
- Lentinus natalensis v.d.Byl.
- Lentinus nigripes Fr.
- Lentinus phillipsii v.d.Byl.
- Lentinus sajor-caju Fr.
- Lentinus sajor-caju var. sparsifolius Pilat.
- Lentinus sajor-caju var. typicus Pilat.
- Lentinus strigosus Fr.
- Lentinus stupeus Klotzsch.
- Lentinus tigrinus Fr.
- Lentinus tuber-regium Fr.
- Lentinus ursinus Fr.
- Lentinus velutinus Fr.
- Lentinus villosus Klotzsch.
- Lentinus villosus var. zeyheri Pilat.
- Lentinus woodii Kalchbr.
- Lentinus zeyheri Berk.

Genus: Lenzites

- Lenzites abietina Fr.
- Lenzites alborepanda Lloyd.
- Lenzites applanata Fr.
- Lenzites aspera Klotszch.
- Lenzites betulina (L.) Fr., (1838), accepted as Trametes betulina (L.) Pilát (1939)
- Lenzites deplanata Fr.
- Lenzites guineensis Fr.
- Lenzites junghuhnii Lev.
- Lenzites ochracea Lloyd
- Lenzites palisoti Fr.
- Lenzites repanda Fr.
- Lenzites trabea (Pers.) Fr. (1838), accepted as Gloeophyllum trabeum (Pers.) Murrill (1908)
- Lenzites tricolor Fr.

Genus: Leotia

- Leotia elegantula Kalchbr.

Genus: Lepiota

- Lepiota acutesquamosa Gill.
- Lepiota africana Kalchbr.
- Lepiota atricapilla Sacc.
- Lepiota cinereo-bubella Kalchbr. & MacOwan
- Lepiota cristata Quél.
- Lepiota cuculliformis Sacc.
- Lepiota excoriata Quél.
- Lepiota flava Beeli.
- Lepiota goossensiae Beeli.
- Lepiota gracilenta Quél.
- Lepiota hispida Gill.
- Lepiota ianthina Mass.
- Lepiota kunzei Sacc.
- Lepiota lutea (Bolton) Godfrin, (1897), accepted as Leucocoprinus birnbaumii (Corda) Singer, (1962)
- Lepiota magnannulata Sacc.
- Lepiota montagnei Sacc.
- Lepiota morgani Peck.
- Lepiota naucina Quél. (sic) could be Lepiota naucina var. cinerascens (Quél.) Konrad & Maubl. (194) accepted as Leucoagaricus cinerascens (Quél.) Bon & Boiffard, in Gams 1978, or Lepiota naucina (Fr.) P. Kumm. (1871), accepted as Leucoagaricus leucothites (Vittad.) Wasser (1977)
- Lepiota nympharum Kalchbr.
- Lepiota polysarca Sacc.
- Lepiota procera S.F.Grey. (sic) could be Lepiota procera (Scop.) Gray (1821) accepted as Macrolepiota procera (Scop.) Singer (1948)
- Lepiota pteropa Sacc.
- Lepiota purpurata Kalchbr.
- Lepiota sulfurella Sacc.
- Lepiota varians Sacc.
- Lepiota zeyheri Sacc.
- Lepiota zeyheri var. elegantula Sacc.
- Lepiota Lepiota zeyheri var. telosa Sacc.
- Lepiota zeyheri var. verrucellosa Sacc.
- Lepiota sp.

Genus: Lepra

- Lepra citrina Schaer.
- Lepra lactea DC.
- Lepra sulphurea Ehrht.

Genus: Lepraria (Lichens)

- Lepraria alba Ach.
- Lepraria candelaris Fr.
- Lepraria citrina Schaer.
- Lepraria crassa Nees.
- Lepraria flava Ach.
- Lepraria glaucella Ach.
- Lepraria xanthina Vain.

Genus: Leproloma

- Leproloma lanuqinosum Nyl.

Genus: Leptogiopsis

- Leptogiopsis brebissonii Müll.Arg.
- Leptogiopsis chloromeloides Müll.Arg.

Genus: Leptogium (Lichens)

- Leptogium adpressum Nyl.
- Leptogium africanum Zahlbr.
- Leptogium azureum Mont.
- Leptogium brebissonii Mont.
- Leptogium bullatum Mont.
- Leptogium bullatum var. dactylinoideum Nyl.
- Leptogium burgesii Mont.
- Leptogium chloromeloides Nyl.
- Leptogium chloromelum Nyl.
- Leptogium chloromelum var. caespitosum Zahlbr.
- Leptogium chloromelum var. crassius Nyl.
- Leptogium daedaleum Nyl.
- Leptogium hildenbrandii Nyl.
- Leptogium kraussii Zahlbr.
- Leptogium marginellum S.F.Gray.
- Leptogium menziesii Mont.
- Leptogium menziesii f. fuliginosum Müll.Arg.
- Leptogium moluccanum Wain.
- Leptogium moluccanum var. simplicata Vain.
- Leptogium phyllocarpum Mont.
- Leptogium phyllocarpum var. coralloideum Hue.
- Leptogium phyllocarpum var. daedaleum Nyl.
- Leptogium phyllocarpum var. isidiosum Nyl.
- Leptogium phyllocarpum var. macrocarpum Nyl.
- Leptogium saturninum Nyl.
- Leptogium tremelloides S.F.Gray.
- Leptogium tremelloides var. azureum Nyl.

Genus: Leptosphaerella

- Leptosphaerella helichrysi Cooke.

Genus: Leptosphaeria

- Leptosphaeria anceps Sacc.
- Leptosphaeria caffra Thuem.
- Leptosphaeria cervispora Sacc.
- Leptosphaeria cinnamomi Shir. & Hara.
- Leptosphaeria coniothyrium Sacc.
- Leptosphaeria helichrysi Sacc.
- Leptosphaeria owaniae Sacc.
- Leptosphaeria protearum Syd.
- Leptosphaeria pterocelastri Doidge
- Leptosphaeria sacchari van Breda.
- Leptosphaeria salvinii Catt., (1879), accepted as Magnaporthe salvinii (Catt.) R.A. Krause & R.K. Webster, (1972)
- Leptosphaeria verwoerdiana du Pless.

Family: Leptostromataceae

Genus: Leptostromella

- Leptostromella acaciae Syd.

Genus: Leptothyrium

- Leptothyrium evansii Syd.
- Leptothyrium pomi (Mont. & Fr.) Sacc. (1880),accepted as Schizothyrium pomi (Mont. & Fr.) Arx, (1959)

Genus: Leptotrema (Lichens)

- Leptotrema endoxanthellum Zahlbr.
- Leptotrema microglaenoides Zahlbr.

Genus: Leveillina

- Leveillina arduinae Theiss. & Syd.

Genus: Leveillula

- Leveillula taurica Am.

Genus: Levieuxia

- Levieuxia natalensis Fr.

== Li ==
Genus: Libertella

- Libertella rhois Kalchbr.

Genus: Lichen

- Lichen albus Roth.
- Lichen atrovirens Linn.
- Lichen barbatus Linn.
- Lichen capensis Linn.f.
- Lichen ceranoides Lam.
- Lichen crispus Linn.
- Lichen crocatus Linn.
- Lichen divaricatus Thunb.
- Lichen excavatus Thunb.
- Lichen fastigiatus Pers.
- Lichen fimbriatus Linn.
- Lichen flammeus Linn.f.
- Lichen flavicans Sw.
- Lichen fragilis Wither.
- Lichen fraxineus Linn.
- Lichen gilvus Ach.
- Lichen helopherus Ach.
- Lichen hepaticus (= Endocarpon thunbergii Lam.)
- Lichen hotentottus Ach.
- Lichen incarnatus Thunb.
- Lichen monocarpus Thunb.
- Lichen opegraphus Lam.
- Lichen pallidoniger Ach.
- Lichen peltatus Lam.
- Lichen peltatus (= Lecanora ostracoderma Lam.)
- Lichen perforatus Wulf.
- Lichen pertusus Thunb.
- Lichen physodes Linn.
- Lichen pulmonarius Linn.
- Lichen pyxidatus Linn.
- Lichen rangiferinus Linn.
- Lichen roccella Linn.
- Lichen rubiginosus Thunb.
- Lichen scriptus Linn.
- Lichen squarrosus Lam.
- Lichen tabularis Thunb.
- Lichen thunbergii Ach.
- Lichen tomentosus Sw.
- Lichen torulosus Thunb.
- Lichen usnea Linn.
- Lichen verruciger Gmel.
- Lichen verrucosus Linn.f.
- Lichen viridis Linn.f.

Lichenes Imperfectae

Genus: Limacinia

- Limacinia nuxiae Doidge
- Limacinia transvaalensis Doidge

Genus: Linderiella

- Linderiella columnata G.H.Cunn.

Genus: Linochora

- Linochora doidgei Syd.

Genus: Linochorella

- Linochorella striiformis Syd.

Genus: Lithographa (Lichens)

- Lithographa cerealis Stizenb.
- Lithographa fumida Nyl.

== Ll ==
Genus: Lloydella

- Lloydella retiruga Bres.

== Lo ==
Genus: Lobaria (Lichens)

- Lobaria interversans Wain.
- Lobaria isidiosa Wain.
- Lobaria meridionalis Wain.
- Lobaria patinifera Hue.
- Lobaria pulnumacea Shirley.
- Lobaria pulmonacea var. hypomela Stizenb.
- Lobaria prdmonacea var. pleurocarpa Ach.
- Lobaria pulmonaria Hoffm.
- Lobaria pulmonaria f. hypomela Cromb.
- Lobaria pulmonaria f. papillaris Hue.
- Lobaria pulmonaria f. pleurocarpa Cromb.
- Lobaria quercizans Michx.
- Lobaria retigera Trevis.
- Lobaria verrucosa Holfm.

Genus: Lobarina

- Lobarina retigera Nyl.
- Lobarina retigera f. isidiosa Stizenb.
- Lobarina scrobiculata Nyl.

Genus: Longia

- Longia natalensis Syd.

Genus: Lopadium

- Lopadium fuscoluteum Mudd.
- Lopadium leucoxanthum Zahlbr.
- Lopadium mariae Zahlbr.
- Lopadium vulpinum Zahlbr.
- Lopadium woodii Zahlbr.

Genus: Lopharia

- Lopharia javanica P. Henn. & E.Nym.
- Lopharia lirellosa Kalchbr. & MacOwan.
- Lopharia mirabilis Pat.

Family: Lophiostomataceae

Genus: Lophodermium

- Lophodermium pinastri Chev.

== Ly ==
Genus: Lycogala (amoebozoa)

- Lycogala epidendrum Fr.
- Lycogala flavo-fuscum Rost.
- Lycogala rufo-cinnamomeum Mass.

Family: Lycogalaceae

Family: Lycoperdaceae

Order: Lycoperdales

Family: Lycoperdeae

Genus: Lycoperdon

- Lycoperdon asperrimum Welw. & Curr.
- Lycoperdon asperum de Toni.
- Lycoperdon atroviolaceum Kalchbr.
- Lycoperdon bicolor Welw. & Curr.
- Lycoperdon bovista Linn.
- Lycoperdon caespitosum Welw. & Curr.
- Lycoperdon caffrorum Kalchbr. & Cooke
- Lycoperdon capense Cooke & Mass.
- Lycoperdon capense Fr.
- Lycoperdon carcinomale Linn.f.
- Lycoperdon cepaeforme Mass.
- Lycoperdon curreyi Mass.
- Lycoperdon curtisii Berk.
- Lycoperdon cyatihiforme Bose.
- Lycoperdon djurense P.Henn.
- Lycoperdon duthiei Bottomley.
- Lycoperdon endotephrum Pat.
- Lycoperdon eylesii Verw.
- Lycoperdon flavum Mass.
- Lycoperdon furfuraceum Schaeff. ex de Toni.
- Lycoperdon gardneri Berk.
- Lycoperdon gemmatum Batsch.
- Lycoperdon glabellum Peck.
- Lycoperdon gunnii Berk.
- Lycoperdon hyemale Vitt.
- Lycoperdon laetum Berk.
- Lycoperdon lilacinum Mass.
- Lycoperdon multiseptum Lloyd.
- Lycoperdon natalense Cooke & Mass.
- Lycoperdon natalense Fr.
- Lycoperdon oblongisporum Berk. & Curt.
- Lycoperdon perlatum Pers.
- Lycoperdon polymorphum Vitt.
- Lycoperdon pratense Pers.
- Lycoperdon pusillum Batsch ex Pers.
- Lycoperdon qudenii Bottomley.
- Lycoperdon radicatum Welw. & Curr.
- Lycoperdon retis Lloyd
- Lycoperdon rhodesianum Verw.
- Lycoperdon saccatum Vahl.
- Lycoperdon subincamatum Peck.
- Lycoperdon umbrinum Pers.
- Lycoperdon welwitschii de Toni.

Genus: Lysurus

- Lysurus borealis P.Henn.
- Lysurus corallocephalus Welw. & Curr.
- Lysurus gardneri Berk.
- Lysurus woodii Lloyd.

== See also ==
- List of bacteria of South Africa
- List of Oomycetes of South Africa
- List of slime moulds of South Africa
- List of fungi of South Africa
  - List of fungi of South Africa – A
  - List of fungi of South Africa – B
  - List of fungi of South Africa – C
  - List of fungi of South Africa – D
  - List of fungi of South Africa – E
  - List of fungi of South Africa – F
  - List of fungi of South Africa – G
  - List of fungi of South Africa – H
  - List of fungi of South Africa – I
  - List of fungi of South Africa – J
  - List of fungi of South Africa – K
  - List of fungi of South Africa – L
  - List of fungi of South Africa – M
  - List of fungi of South Africa – N
  - List of fungi of South Africa – O
  - List of fungi of South Africa – P
  - List of fungi of South Africa – Q
  - List of fungi of South Africa – R
  - List of fungi of South Africa – S
  - List of fungi of South Africa – T
  - List of fungi of South Africa – U
  - List of fungi of South Africa – V
  - List of fungi of South Africa – W
  - List of fungi of South Africa – X
  - List of fungi of South Africa – Y
  - List of fungi of South Africa – Z
