= Lecanora sanctae-helenae =

Scientific classification
- Domain: Eukaryota
- Kingdom: Fungi
- Division: Ascomycota
- Class: Lecanoromycetes
- Order: Lecanorales
- Family: Lecanoraceae
- Genus: Lecanora
- Species: L. sanctae-helenae

Binomial name
- Lecanora sanctae-helenae Müll.Arg. (1893)

Species of lichen

Lecanora sanctae-helenae is a species of saxicolous (rock-dwelling), crustose lichen in the family Lecanoraceae. It was formally described as a new species in 1893 by Swiss botanist Johannes Müller Argoviensis, from specimens collected in Saint Helena Island by British amateur naturalist John Charles Melliss. The type locality is referenced in the species epithet. More than a century later, it was accepted in a 1995 revision of the species complex related to Lecanora subcarnea. For decades it was thought to be endemic to this island, where it occurs on siliceous rocks. It was reported from Ascension Island in 2008, where it is locally common.

== Description ==
The lichen has a thick, greyish-white to creamish, crust-like thallus lacking soredia and a prothallus. The apothecia are irregularly rounded and measure 0.5–2 mm in diameter, with a reddish to pinkish disc thickly covered with pruina; the apothecia have characteristically thick margins. It produces hyaline, non-septate ascospores measuring 9–12 by 5–7 μm. The spores number eight per ascus. Atranorin, norstictic acid, placodioloic acid, and protocetraric acid are major lichen products in Lecanora sanctae-helenae; chloroatranorin and salazinic acid are minor substances. Lecanora farinacea is morphologically similar, but that species does not contain placodioloic acid.

== See also ==
- List of Lecanora species
