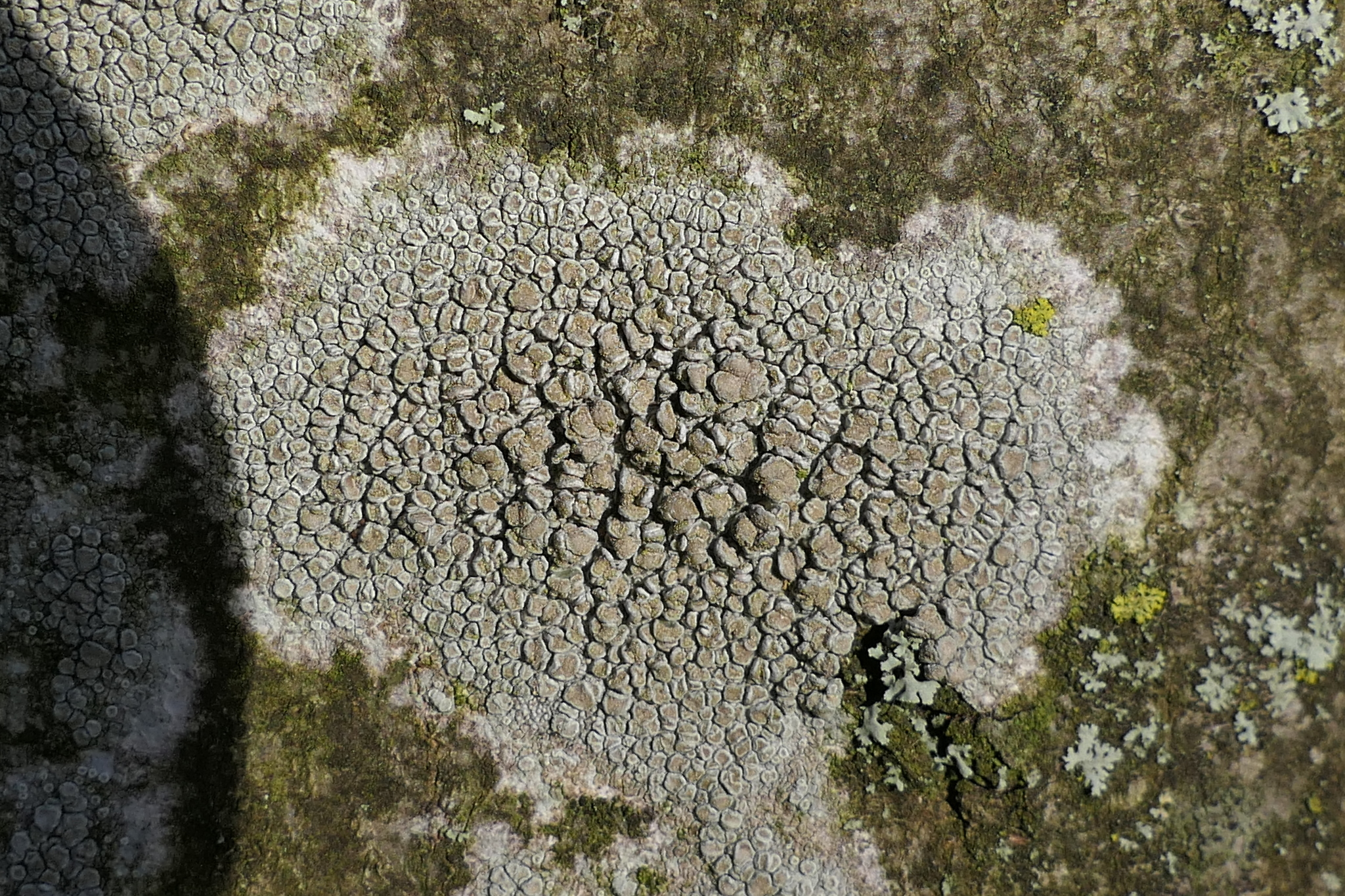
- Glaucomaria carpinea

Scientific classification
- Kingdom: Fungi
- Division: Ascomycota
- Class: Lecanoromycetes
- Order: Lecanorales
- Family: Lecanoraceae
- Genus: Glaucomaria; M.Choisy (1929)

Type species
- Glaucomaria rupicola (L.) P.F.Cannon (2022)

Species
- G. bicincta G. bicinctoidea G. carpinea G. flavescens G. leptyrodes G. lojkaeana G. rupicola G. subcarpinea G. swartzii

= Glaucomaria =

Genus of lichen-forming fungi

Glaucomaria is a genus of lichen-forming fungi in the family Lecanoraceae. Species in this genus have a crust-like growth form and are distinguished by their heavily powdery fruiting bodies, which produce a bright lemon-yellow colour when treated with bleach. The genus occurs on both tree bark and siliceous rock across most continents, though it is absent from Antarctica. All species produce the compounds sordidone and atranorin as their main secondary metabolites.

== Taxonomy ==
In 2025, a multi-locus phylogenetic study of Lecanora sensu lato (based on seven DNA loci, including mitochondrial markers) recovered several well-supported clades and supported the resurrection of Glaucomaria for the former Lecanora carpinea/L. rupicola group. Before its resurrection as Glaucomaria, these species were usually discussed within Lecanora as part of the "Lecanora rupicola group" (or a rupicola species complex) in earlier phylogenetic and phenotypic work.

The name Glaucomaria was introduced by Maurice Choisy in 1929 for a set of lecanoroid lichens with heavily pruinose apothecia and a typically pale epithecium; the type species is Glaucomaria rupicola.

== Description ==
Glaucomaria is characterized by a crust-like (crustose) thallus, which is sometimes spread out with a radiating pattern (placodioid). The colour of the thallus ranges from white-yellowish green to pale grey. The apothecia (fruiting bodies) initially grow attached (adnate) and can become slightly raised (sessile) or nearly stalked (substipitate). These apothecia feature a heavily powdery (pruinose) disc that reacts to the C spot test to produce an intense lemon-yellow colour. The margin of the apothecia is persistent, sometimes being pushed aside (finally excluded), and occasionally surrounded by a black, wavy (flexuose) ring.

The outer layer of the apothecia (thalline exciple) typically has a phenocorticate cortex (containing hyphal fragments and dead, collapsed algal cells), numerous algal cells, and both large and small crystals, with the latter dissolving in a solution of potassium hydroxide (K). The inner layer (proper exciple) ranges from thin to thick, dark on the outside and upper part but colourless inside. The epithecium (topmost layer of the apothecia) is brown to dark brown with crystals, both the pigment and crystals dissolving in K. The hymenium, the spore-producing layer, is colourless and does not contain oil droplets. The paraphyses (sterile filaments in the hymenium) are slightly thickened at the top. The layer below the hymenium (hypothecium) is colourless and not interspersed with droplets.

The asci (spore-bearing cells) of Glaucomaria are club-shaped (clavate) and very thin-walled. They contain a tall structure in the middle (tholus) that reacts to iodine and potassium hydroxide by turning blue (K/I+ blue), surrounded by a blue outer layer (Lecanora-type). The ascospores are single-celled, hyaline (translucent), ellipsoid, and have a wall less than 1 μm thick. The photobiont, the photosynthetic partner of the lichen, is chlorococcoid a type of green algae (chlorococcoid).

Most species have an episubstratal, whitish to grey thallus that is usually esorediate, although some taxa are sorediate; isidia are absent. Species occur both on bark and on siliceous rock, and the genus is subcosmopolitan, being recorded from most continents but absent from Antarctica.

== Chemistry ==
All Glaucomaria species produce the chromone compound sordidone and atranorin as major secondary metabolites, with chloroatranorin and/or eugenitol as frequent minor substances. Many saxicolous species also contain roccellic acid, and some taxa produce psoromic acid and xanthones such as arthothelin and thiophanic acid (and related compounds).

== Species ==
- Glaucomaria bicincta (Ramond) S.Y.Kondr., Lőkös & Farkas (2019)
- Glaucomaria bicinctoidea (Blaha & Grube) Ivanovich-Hichins (2025)
- Glaucomaria carpinea (L.) S.Y.Kondr., Lőkös & Farkas (2019)
- Glaucomaria flavescens (Cl.Roux & Tønsberg) Ivanovich-Hichins (2025)
- Glaucomaria leptyrodes (Nyl.) Ivanovich-Hichins & Printzen (2025)
- Glaucomaria lojkaeana (Szatala) S.Y.Kondr., Lőkös & Farkas (2019)
- Glaucomaria rupicola (L.) P.F.Cannon (2022)
- Glaucomaria subcarpinea (Szatala) S.Y.Kondr., Lőkös & Farkas (2019)
- Glaucomaria swartzii (Ach.) S.Y.Kondr., Lőkös & Farkas (2019)
