= Lecanora xanthoplumosella =

Scientific classification
- Domain: Eukaryota
- Kingdom: Fungi
- Division: Ascomycota
- Class: Lecanoromycetes
- Order: Lecanorales
- Family: Lecanoraceae
- Genus: Lecanora
- Species: L. xanthoplumosella

Binomial name
- Lecanora xanthoplumosella Lumbsch & Elix (2011)

Species of lichen

Lecanora xanthoplumosella is a species of crustose lichen in the family Lecanoraceae. Known from Australia, it was described as new to science in 2011.

== Taxonomy ==
The Lecanora xanthoplumosella was formally described by the lichenologists H. Thorsten Lumbsch and John Elix, who introduced it as a distinct species in 2011. This newly delineated species owes its name to a superficial resemblance with another neotropical species, Lecanora xanthoplumosa. As such, the etymological roots of Lecanora xanthoplumosella link it to this neotropical cousin.

The type specimen of Lecanora xanthoplumosella, was collected from the Razorback Range (north of Mount Morgan) in Queensland, Australia. Collected by the second author in August 1993, it was found in a dry sclerophyll forest situated on a steep slope enriched with Cycas and Macrozamia, growing on metamorphic rocks.

== Description ==
Lecanora xanthoplumosella has a cream to light yellow thallus — a vegetative layer that comprises the main body of the lichen. Its thickness varies, presenting a thin to thick texture. Its surface, smooth and epruinose, meaning it lacks any powdery or crystalline covering, is notably free of isidia and soredia, two common forms of vegetative reproduction in lichens.

There are a multitude of sessile apothecia – the fruiting bodies where spores are produced – that are abundant and dispersed across the lichen's surface. These are roundish and range from a plane to convex shape, measuring between 0.5 and 1.2 mm in diameter. Their margin is lecanorine – shared with the thallus – and it evolves over time from being smooth to having a strikingly verruculose, or warty, texture.

Microscopically, Lecanora xanthoplumosella is distinguished by its broadly ellipsoid to ellipsoid ascospores, which measure between 9.5 and 13.5 μm by 6.0–7.5 μm.

Lecanora xanthoplumosella contains several secondary metabolites (lichen products). Among these, the dominant compound is thiophanic acid. Others include arthothelin, 2’-O-methylperlatolic acid, and 5-chloro-2'-O-methylanziaic acid — all appearing in minor quantities. Two other substances, atranorin and chloroatranorin, are also part of its chemical profile in trace amounts.

The expected results of standard chemical spot tests conducted on this species are: K+ (yellow), C+ (orange), KC+ (orange), and a dark orange reaction under UV light (UV+).

== Similar species ==
Within the genus Lecanora, L. xanthoplumosella might be confused with several species, including Lecanora margarodes and L. pseudogangaleoides ssp. verdonii. It stands apart from L. margarodes by its lack of pannarin – a substance found in other species – despite having similar ascospore length. The species is also distinguished from L. pseudogangaleoides ssp. verdonii, which is characterised by its black apothecial discs, egranulose epihymenium — an upper layer of the hymenium lacking granules — and the presence of usnic acid, a substance not found in L. xanthoplumosella.

Although bearing a superficial resemblance to L. xanthoplumosella, the neotropical L. xanthoplumosa actually shows several differences. Notably, it has smaller apothecia with epruinose or slightly pruinose apothecial discs, and presents a different chemosyndrome — the chodation chemosyndrome.

== Habitat and distribution ==
Native to Australia, Lecanora xanthoplumosella can be found growing on siliceous rocks in semi-exposed to exposed habitats in dry sclerophyll forests in Queensland. At the time of its original publication, the lichen species had so far been recorded in just two localities, at elevations ranging between 300 and 860 m (980 and 2,820 ft).

== See also ==
- List of Lecanora species
