= Buellia eldridgei =

Scientific classification
- Kingdom: Fungi
- Division: Ascomycota
- Class: Lecanoromycetes
- Order: Caliciales
- Family: Caliciaceae
- Genus: Buellia
- Species: B. eldridgei

Binomial name
- Buellia eldridgei Elix (2020)
- Holotype site: Merigol Station, Queensland

Species of lichen

Buellia eldridgei is a rare species of terricolous (ground-dwelling), crustose lichen in the family Caliciaceae, known to occur only in Queensland, Australia.

== Taxonomy ==
The lichen was formally described by the Australian lichenologist John Elix in 2020. The type specimen was collected from Merigol Station, Andersen Paddock (Queensland), where it was found growing on soil in open woodland on soft mulga sandplain with Eucalyptus populnea and Acacia aneura as the dominant plant vegetation. This species is named in honour of Professor David Eldridge, who collected the type specimen.

== Description ==
The Buellia eldridgei lichen has a crust-like body (thallus) that can either have a cracked, tile-like appearance (areolate) or be almost scale-like (subsquamulose), and can grow up to 10 mm wide. The individual tile-like pieces, or areoles, can be either closely packed or spread apart, each measuring 0.4–1 mm wide. These areoles are rounded and can be either flat or slightly raised (convex). The top of the thallus has a pale yellow-brown colour and a glossy finish, and it does not have a distinct border (prothallus) separating it from the surface it grows on. Inside the thallus, the layer known as the medulla is white and contains calcium oxalate crystals, as indicated by turning positive when treated with sulfuric acid, but it does not change colour when iodine is applied. The cells of the algae living in partnership with the fungus (photobiont cells) are relatively small, with a diameter of 7–14 μm.

The fruiting bodies of the lichen, known as apothecia, are quite small, ranging from 0.4 to 0.8 mm wide. These structures are lecideine, meaning they have a disc that lacks a thalline margin. They are either embedded in the thallus or just slightly attached to it, usually one per areole. The disc of the apothecia is black, not powdery (epruinose), and can be flat or slightly sunken. The proper exciple, the rim surrounding the disc, is thick at first and protrudes above the disc, but becomes thinner and levels with the disc as it matures. The outer zone of this rim is dark brown and about 25–30 μm thick, while the inner zone is a paler brown. The layer just above the spore-producing tissue (epihymenium) is brown and 10–12 μm thick. The supporting tissue beneath the spore-producing tissue (hypothecium) is brown to dark brown and quite thick, measuring 150–175 μm. The actual spore-producing layer (hymenium) is 65–75 μm thick, clear, and not interspersed with particles; the layer just beneath it (subhymenium) is a pale brown and 20–30 μm thick. The slender, branching structures (paraphyses) within the hymenium are 2–2.5 μm wide, with brown-capped tips. The spore-producing sacs (asci) are typical of the Bacidia type and usually contain eight spores. The spores themselves are of the Buellia type, brown, ellipsoid, and measure 11–16 by 6–9 μm. Older spores show constriction at the division, and their outer walls are wrinkled (rugulate). No pycnidia (another type of reproductive structure) were observed in this species. In terms of reactions to standard chemical spot tests, the medulla is K− and Pd− but is C+ (orange) and UV+ (orange), indicating the presence of 6-O-methylarthothelin as the major chemical component and arthothelin as a minor component.

Buellia eldridgei is similar to Buellia dijiana but is distinguished by having shorter ascospores, a thinner hymenium, and by its distinct chemistry.

== Habitat and distribution ==
At the time of its original publication, Buellia eldridgei was known only from its type collection in the type locality in Queensland, Australia.
