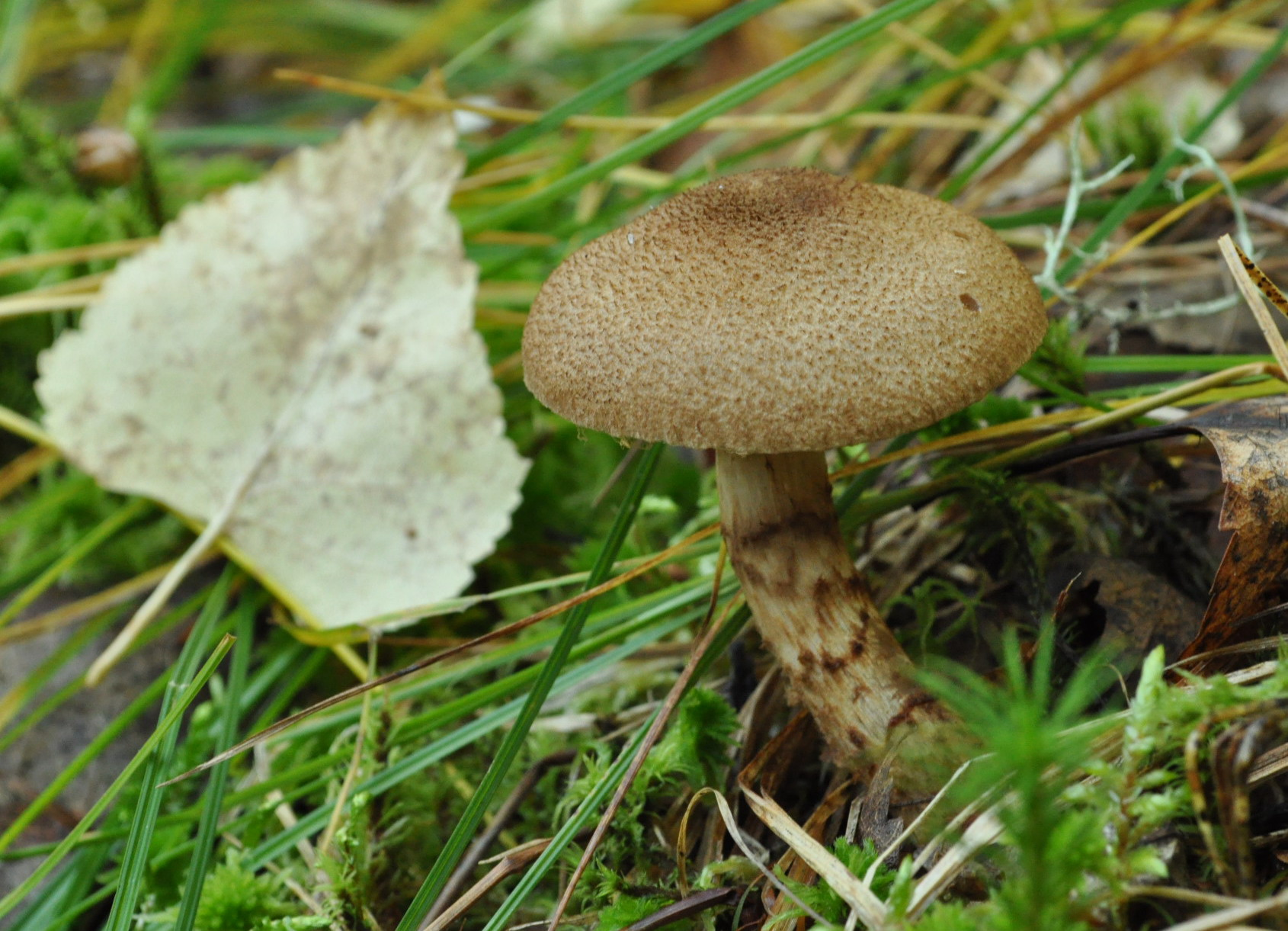
- Cortinarius pholideus near Khanty-Mansiysk (Western Siberia)

Scientific classification
- Kingdom: Fungi
- Division: Basidiomycota
- Class: Agaricomycetes
- Order: Agaricales
- Family: Cortinariaceae
- Genus: Cortinarius
- Species: C. pholideus

Binomial name
- Cortinarius pholideus (Liljeblad) Fries, 1838

= Cortinarius pholideus =

Species of fungus

Cortinarius pholideus is a species of fungus native to Finland, Great Britain, and Norway. It can also be found in North America. It is considered inedible.
