= Heteroacanthella =

Scientific classification
- Domain: Eukaryota
- Kingdom: Fungi
- Division: Basidiomycota
- Class: Agaricomycetes
- Order: Auriculariales
- Genus: Heteroacanthella; Oberw. (1990)

Type species
- Heteroacanthella variabilis Oberw. & Langer (1990)

Species
- Heteroacanthella acanthophysa; Heteroacanthella ellipsospora

Synonyms
- Acanthellorhiza P. Roberts (1999)

Family of fungi

Heteroacanthella is a genus of fungi in the order Auriculariales. Basidiocarps (fruit bodies) are corticioid (effused, patch-forming) with smooth surfaces and occur on dead, attached wood or on lichens. They are microscopically distinctive in having acanthoid (spiny) basidia with just one or two large sterigmata producing large, globose to ellipsoid basidiospores. The genus occurs worldwide, though individual species may be localized. Three species have been described to date.
