= Heteroacanthella ellipsospora =

Scientific classification
- Kingdom: Fungi
- Division: Basidiomycota
- Class: Agaricomycetes
- Order: Auriculariales
- Genus: Heteroacanthella
- Species: H. ellipsospora

Binomial name
- Heteroacanthella ellipsospora J.C.Zamora, Pérez-Ort. & V.J.Rico (2014)

Species of lichen

Heteroacanthella ellipsospora is a species of fungus of uncertain familial placement in the order Auriculariales. The fungus is lichenicolous (lichen-dwelling), and it parasitises the apothecia and thallus of the crustose lichen Glaucomaria carpinea.

== Taxonomy ==
Heteroacanthella ellipsospora was formally described as a new species in 2014 by Juan Carlos Zamora, Sergio Pérez-Ortega and Víctor Rico. The type specimen (holotype) was collected in Spain, in the Community of Madrid, near Urbanización La Chopera in Collado Villalba. It was found parasitizing Lecanora carpinea growing on Prunus branches at an elevation of 890 m on 29 December 2010.

== Description ==
Heteroacanthella ellipsospora is a lichenicolous fungus (a fungus that grows on lichens) that exclusively parasitizes the crustose epiphytic lichen Lecanora carpinea, which typically grows on tree branches. This parasitic relationship is characterized by the fungus replacing the host's tissues with its own, preventing the lichen from producing spores and effectively demonstrating its parasitic nature.

Macroscopically, H. ellipsospora is often inconspicuous, though it sometimes forms pale-coloured, gall-like swellings 0.1–0.8 mm in diameter on the host lichen. The fungus grows specifically in the apothecia (disc-shaped fruiting bodies) and surrounding thallus (main body) of Lecanora carpinea. Under microscopic examination, it reveals a monomitic hyphal system with smooth, hyaline (colourless and transparent) hyphae that are thin to slightly thick-walled and feature clamp connections at primary septa.

The distinctive reproductive structures of H. ellipsospora include acanthoid (spine-covered) basidia (spore-producing cells) that are typically single-sterigmate (having one projection for spore production). These basidia are stalked, with shapes ranging from roughly spherical to broadly club-shaped (clavate), and surfaces that vary from smooth to warty or echinate (covered with spines). The fungus also produces acanthohyphidia (sterile elements with spine-like projections) and more or less ellipsoid basidiospores that can self-replicate.

Heteroacanthella ellipsospora is unique for being the first lichenicolous species in the genus Heteroacanthella, as the other two known species in this genus are saprotrophic (feeding on dead organic matter). It has thus far only been documented in the Jaén and Madrid provinces of Spain, where it inhabits dry to subhumid evergreen or deciduous forests at elevations ranging from 590–1050 metres. It shows a preference for young branches of trees and spiny deciduous shrubs at forest edges or in human-influenced boundary areas.

== Habitat and distribution ==
Heteroacanthella ellipsospora was first described from specimens collected in the Spanish provinces of Jaén and Madrid, and later reported from Sweden.
