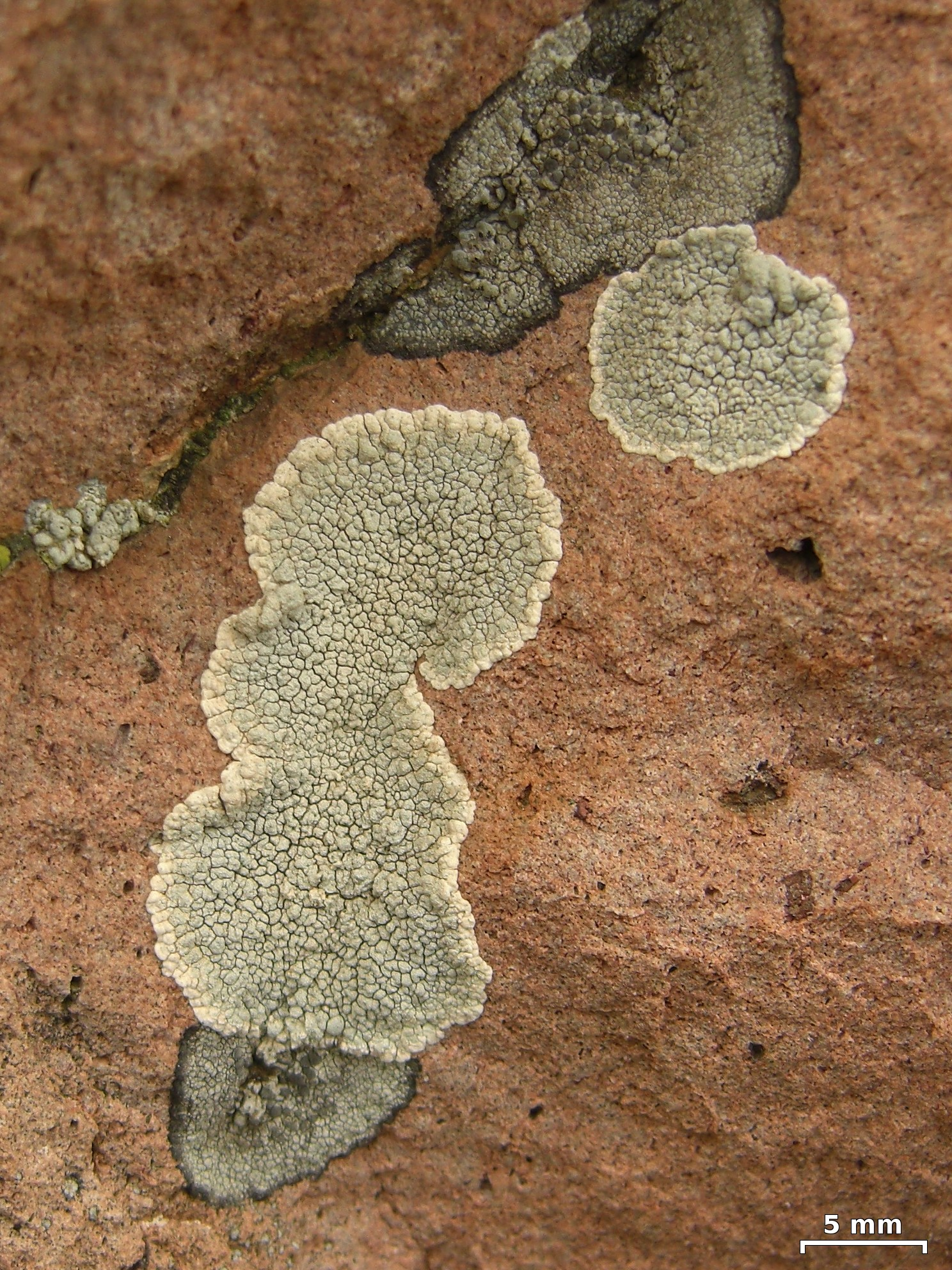

Scientific classification
- Domain: Eukaryota
- Kingdom: Fungi
- Division: Ascomycota
- Class: Lecanoromycetes
- Order: Lecanorales
- Family: Lecanoraceae
- Genus: Lecanora
- Species: L. subcarnea

Binomial name
- Lecanora subcarnea (Lilj.) Ach. (1810)

Synonyms
- Lichen subcarneus Lilj. (1792); Verrucaria subcarnea (Sw.) Ach. (1794); Lecidea subcarnea (Sw.) Ach. (1803); Parmelia subcarnea (Sw.) Spreng. (1827); Lecanora sordida var. subcarnea (Lilj.) Th.Fr. (1861); Zeora sordida var. subcarnea (Lilj.) Körb.; Zeora subcarnea (Sw.) Arnold (1870)

= Lecanora subcarnea =

Species of crustose lichen

Lecanora subcarnea is a species of crustose lichen in the family Lecanoraceae, first described in 1792 as Lichen subcarneus by Swedish botanist Samuel Liljeblad and later transferred to the genus Lecanora by Erik Acharius in 1810. The lichen forms a continuous white to pale yellowish-grey thallus with small areoles, distinctive pinkish to pale grey-brown apothecia (fruiting bodies) covered in white powdery crystals, and produces chemical compounds including atranorin and protocetraric acid that yield characteristic reactions in spot tests. It grows primarily in sheltered cracks of silica-rich rocks with high base content, occurring locally in parts of the United Kingdom including northern England, Wales, Scotland, and the Channel Islands, though some historical records from southwest England, Pembrokeshire, and Ireland have been determined to be misidentifications.

== Taxonomy ==
The lichen was first scientifically described in 1792 as Lichen subcarneus by the Swedish botanist Samuel Liljeblad. In the original description, Liljeblad characterized it as whitish with unequally sized, nearly meat-coloured nodules. He noted its habitat as being on mountains near Norrköping, Sweden, and described it as having a smooth edge. According to the protologue, the lichen gives a yellowish-brown colour when used for dyeing. It was transferred to Lecanora by Erik Acharius in 1810.

== Description ==
Lecanora subcarnea forms a continuous crustose thallus (the lichen body) that is finely cracked to form small, often slightly raised areoles (individual sections) with crenulate (scalloped) margins. The thallus varies from white or pale grey to pale yellow or yellowish grey, and its surface ranges from coarsely granular to warted. A distinct white, fibrous prothallus (the initial fungal growth margin) often borders the thallus.

The apothecia (disc‑shaped fruiting bodies) are typically clustered and measure (0.2–) 0.4–1 (–1.7) mm in diameter. They begin immersed in the thallus and become sessile or slightly raised, developing a thalline margin that remains entire and is the same colour as—or gradually paler than—the thallus, though it may become excluded with age. The disc itself is pinkish to pale grey‑brown, convex to almost spherical (globose), and usually covered by a dense coating of white to bluish pruinose (powdery) crystals. The epithecium (the uppermost layer above the hymenium) is brown and granular, while the hymenium (the spore‑bearing layer) is 35–55 μm tall. Paraphyses (sterile supporting filaments) are 1.5–2 μm wide, unbranched or sparsely branched near their tips, with apical cells up to 3.5 μm across.

Ascospores are broadly ellipsoid, typically measuring 10–14 by 6–8 μm. Standard spot tests on the thallus are C–, K+ (yellow), Pd+ (orange → red). There is no fluorescence under ultraviolet light (UV–). These chemical reactions are characteristic of secondary metabolites such as atranorin, chloroatranorin and protocetraric acid.

== Habitat and distribution ==
In the United Kingdom, Lecanora subcarnea occurs locally in sheltered cracks of silica‑rich rocks that have a high base content, and only occasionally on limestone near lakes or within woodland sites. It has been reliably reported from Westmorland in England, northern Wales, central and eastern Scotland, and the Channel Islands; earlier records from south‑west England, Pembrokeshire and, possibly, Ireland have since been shown to be incorrect.

== See also ==
- List of Lecanora species
