= Buellia dijiana =

Scientific classification
- Domain: Eukaryota
- Kingdom: Fungi
- Division: Ascomycota
- Class: Lecanoromycetes
- Order: Caliciales
- Family: Caliciaceae
- Genus: Buellia
- Species: B. dijiana

Binomial name
- Buellia dijiana Trinkaus (2001)

Species of lichen

Buellia dijiana is a species of terricolous (ground-dwelling), crustose lichen in the family Caliciaceae. It is found in Australia.

The lichen was formally described as a new species in 2001 by Austrian lichenologist Ulrike Trinkhous. The type specimen was collected by the author in the Murray Mallee region between Morgan and Eudunda (South Australia); here, it was found growing on soil in mallee scrub. It has also been recorded in Western Australia and in New South Wales.

The thallus of the lichen ranges in form from crustose (crusty) to granulose (grainy) to squamulose (scaley) or some intermediate. Its colour is chalky to whitish. The apothecia are numerous, and measure 0.9–1.7 mm wide. Ascospores usually number 8 per ascus; when young they are greyish to greenish, but they become brown in maturity. Secondary compounds that occur in the lichen include arthothelin as a major substance, and minor amounts of dichloronorlichexanthone and thiophanic acid. The species epithet dijiana is derived from the word diji, which means "Sun" in the language spoken by the Diyari tribe of Indigenous Australians; it alludes to the sunny, open habitats preferred by the lichen.

== See also ==
- List of Buellia species
