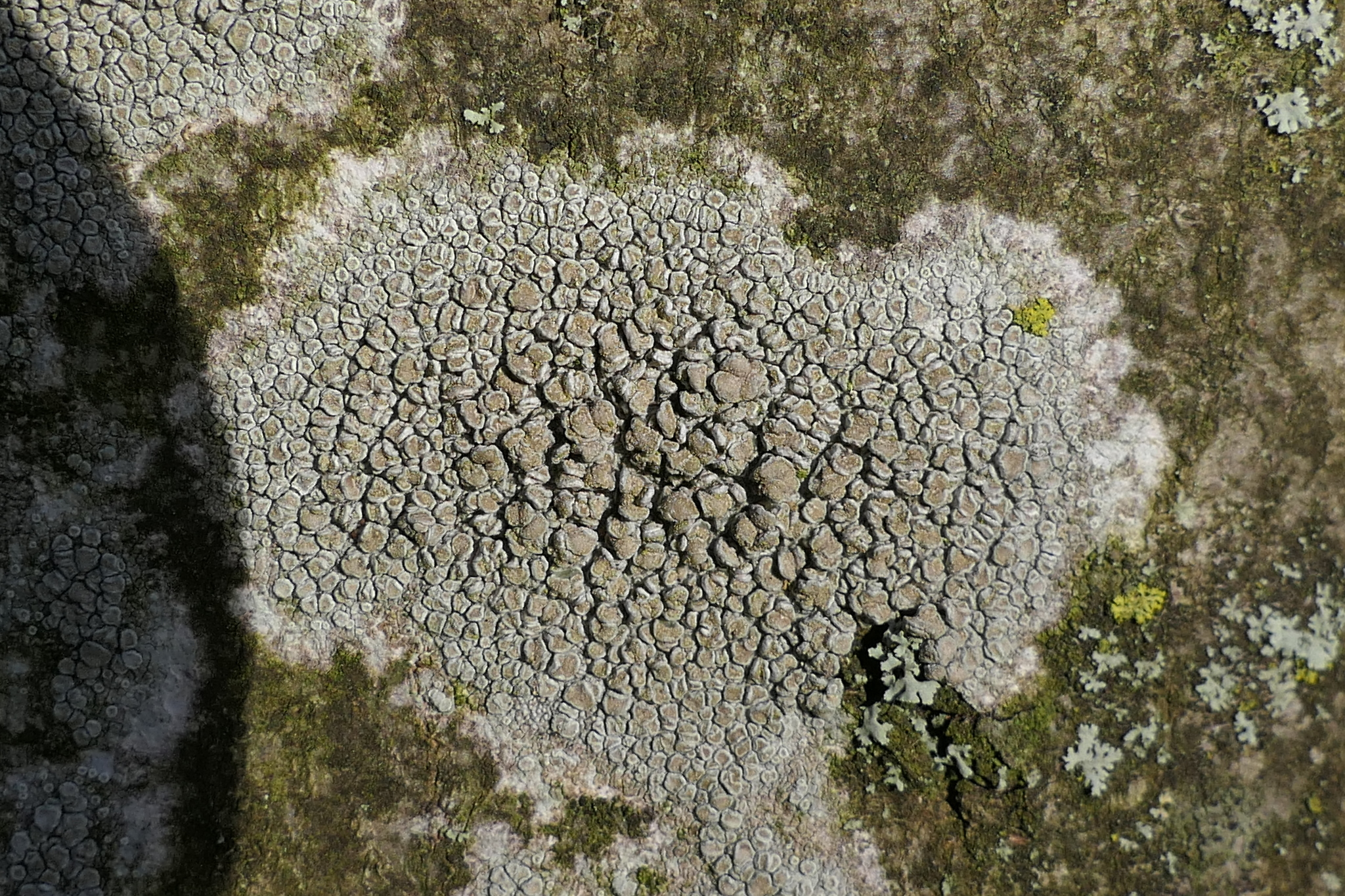

Scientific classification
- Kingdom: Fungi
- Division: Ascomycota
- Class: Lecanoromycetes
- Order: Lecanorales
- Family: Lecanoraceae
- Genus: Glaucomaria
- Species: G. carpinea

Binomial name
- Glaucomaria carpinea (L.) S.Y.Kondr., Lőkös & Farkas (2019)

Synonyms
- List: Lichen carpineus L. (1753); Scutellaria carpinea (L.) Baumg. (1790); Variolaria faginea * carpineus (L.) DC. (1805); Lecanora carpinea (L.) Vain. (1888); Lichen angulosus Schreb. (1771); Scutellaria angulosa (Schreb.) Baumg. (1790); Verrucaria angulosa (Schreb.) Hoffm. (1796); Patellaria angulosa (Schreb.) Hoffm. (1796); Parmelia angulosa (Schreb.) Ach. (1803); Lecanora angulosa (Schreb.) Ach. (1810); Courtoisia angulosa (Schreb.) L.Marchand (1830); Parmelia subfusca var. angulosa (Schreb.) Fr. (1831); Lecanora subfusca var. angulosa (Schreb.) Link (1833); Psora subfusca var. angulosa (Schreb.) Fürnr. (1839); Parmelia pallida var. angulosa (Schreb.) Schaer. (1840); Lecanora pallida var. angulosa (Schreb.) Rabenh. (1845); Parmelia albella var. angulosa (Schreb.) Fr. (1845); Lecanora albella var. angulosa (Schreb.) Flot. (1849); Patellaria pallida var. angulosa (Schreb.) Trevis. (1853); Lecanora albella subsp. angulosa (Schreb.) Nyl. (1861); Lecanora pallida f. angulosa (Schreb.) Bagl. & Car. (1867); Lecanora albella f. angulosa (Schreb.) Nyl. (1868); Lecanora subfusca f. angulosa (Schreb.) Leight. (1871); Lecanora pallida subsp. angulosa (Schreb.) Fink (1910)

= Glaucomaria carpinea =

Species of lichen

Glaucomaria carpinea is a species of corticolous (bark-dwelling), crustose lichen in the family Lecanoraceae. It is a widely distributed species.

== Taxonomy ==
The lichen was first scientifically described by Carl Linnaeus in 1753. It has had a complex taxonomic history, and has been transferred to several genera, including Lecanora, Scutellaria, and Variolaria. It is synonymous with Lichen angulosus, as defined by Johann Christian Daniel von Schreber in 1771, and all of the names resulting from generic transfers of that taxon. Sergey Kondratyuk, László Sándor Lőkös, and Edit Farkas transferred it to the genus Glaucomaria in 2019.

== Description ==
Glaucomaria carpinea has a crust-like (crustose) thallus that is either continuous or cracked. It has a whitish to grey colour, with a smooth texture and is not covered with a powdery substance (epruinose). This lichen is sometimes bordered by a white growth (prothallus) at its edges. Its apothecia (fruiting bodies) are typically crowded together and can be round or angular due to mutual compression. These apothecia are flat or slightly convex, measuring 0.5–1.5 mm across, and have an orange-brown to flesh-coloured disc heavily covered in white pruina. The margin of the apothecia is thin, slightly prominent, and typically not wavy.

The outer ring of the apothecia (the thalline exciple) features a well-developed cortex composed of vertically aligned hyphae (an anticlinal arrangement), with a medulla containing crystals that dissolve in a solution of potassium hydroxide (K). The inner ring (proper exciple) is thin and colourless, also filled with K-soluble crystals. The epithecium (topmost layer of the apothecia) is pale brown with a layer of fine crystals, with both the pigment and crystals dissolving in K to produce a bright yellow colour change (C+ bright yellow). The hymenium, the spore-producing layer, is colourless and 50–70 μm high. The paraphyses (sterile filaments in the hymenium) are slightly thickened at the top. The layer below the hymenium (hypothecium) is colourless.

The asci (spore-bearing cells) of Glaucomaria carpinea are elongated-club shaped (elongate-clavate) and very thin-walled, containing eight spores each. These asci have a tall structure in the middle (tholus) that reacts to iodine and potassium hydroxide by turning blue (K/I+ blue), surrounded by a blue outer layer. The ascospores are single-celled, hyaline (translucent), simple, broadly ellipsoid, and measure 9–14.5 by 5–8.5 μm with a thin wall. The photobiont, the photosynthetic partner of the lichen, is chlorococcoid–a spherical green alga.

Chemical tests on the thallus reveal a yellow reaction to the K spot test (K+ yellow) and contain atranorin as the major compound, with minor amounts of chloroatranorin and eugenitol. The pruina on the apothecial disc contains a major metabolite called sordidone. Glaucomaria carpinea has been noted to be a morphologically variable species, particularly in the deposition of pruina on various surfaces and the thickness of the margins. However, the lichen tends to be anatomically and chemically uniform.

== Habitat and distribution ==
Glaucomaria carpinea has a nearly cosmopolitan distribution. It has been recorded from Africa, Asia, Europe, Macaronesia, New Zealand, and North America. Its usual substrate is the smooth bark of deciduous trees, especially on twigs, branches, and young trunks.

== Species interactions ==
Lichenicolous (lichen-dwelling) fungi that have been recorded parasitising Glaucomaria carpinea include Arthonia subfuscicola, Sphaerellothecium propinquellum, Tremella endosporogena, and Heteroacanthella ellipsospora.

== See also ==
- List of lichens named by Carl Linnaeus
