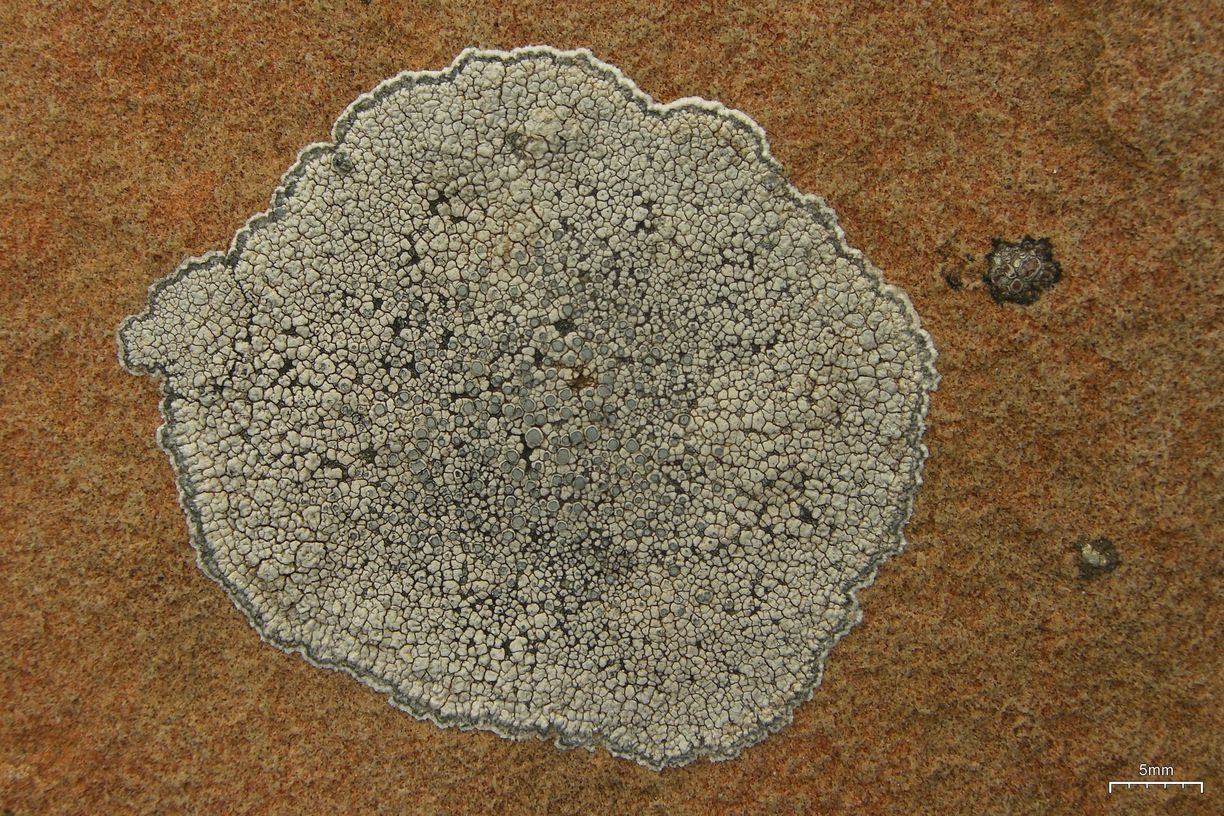

Conservation status
- Secure (NatureServe)

Scientific classification
- Kingdom: Fungi
- Division: Ascomycota
- Class: Lecanoromycetes
- Order: Lecanorales
- Family: Lecanoraceae
- Genus: Glaucomaria
- Species: G. rupicola

Binomial name
- Glaucomaria rupicola (L.) P.F.Cannon (2022)

Synonyms
- Lichen rupicola L. (1767); Verrucaria rupicola (L.) Humb. (1793); Patellaria rupicola (L.) Trevis. (1851); Lecanora rupicola (L.) Zahlbr. (1928)

= Glaucomaria rupicola =

Species of lichen-forming fungus

Glaucomaria rupicola, the white rim lichen, is a species of crustose lichen in the family Lecanoraceae. It forms thick, whitish-grey patches on hard, exposed siliceous rock such as granite, from coastal cliffs to mountain summits. The fruiting bodies are typically covered by a conspicuous pale grey powdery coating, and the disc reacts bright yellow with bleach (the C spot test). The species has a wide distribution, occurring across Europe, North America, and Asia in the Northern Hemisphere, and extending into South America and other southern regions. It is particularly common on wave-splashed rocks just above the high-tide line and on well-lit rock outcrops inland. A 2025 molecular study confirmed its placement in the resurrected genus Glaucomaria, separate from Lecanora in the strict sense.

== Taxonomy ==
Glaucomaria rupicola was originally described by Carl Linnaeus in 1767 as Lichen rupicola, characterised as a pale, leprose crust with pale tubercles edged in white, and reported from bare, sun-exposed, flat rock surfaces in woodland. It was later widely treated in a broad concept of Lecanora by Alexander Zahlbruckner in 1928. The genus Glaucomaria was introduced by Maurice Choisy in 1929, and Josef Hafellner later fixed its application by lectotypifying the genus on Lecanora rupicola. In current usage, the correct name for the species is Glaucomaria rupicola (L.) P.F.Cannon (2022); a 2019 attempt to publish this combination under Glaucomaria did not satisfy the requirements for valid publication under the botanical code.

Modern work treats G. rupicola as part of the Lecanora carpinea/rupicola lineage: a set of superficially Lecanora-like species whose apothecial discs are often covered by a conspicuous whitish to yellowish powdery layer (pruina) linked to the chromone compound sordidone (sometimes with the related compound eugenitol). Earlier authors documented the shared chemistry and morphology of this group but were cautious about treating Glaucomaria as a separate genus until phylogenetic evidence clarified where these taxa sit within Lecanora in the broad sense.

Using a multi-locus phylogeny of Lecanora (in the broad sense), Ivanovich-Hichins and colleagues recovered the carpinea/rupicola lineage as a distinct clade and supported recognising it at genus rank as Glaucomaria, separate from Lecanora in a strict sense. They also found no evidence that the superficially similar Lecanora albella group belongs in this genus, and therefore excluded it from Glaucomaria for the time being.

== Description ==
The thallus is a crustose lichen that forms continuous, clearly bounded patches or a mosaic of cracked surface units. It is typically rimose (cracked), often rather thick and uneven, with flat to slightly convex areoles. Colour is usually white-grey, but some thalli are darker grey with greenish or brownish tones; the surface is generally fairly smooth. A prothallus is usually pale or hard to see, though it can appear grey-black where neighbouring thalli of the same species meet. Soredia are ordinarily absent, although sorediate material has been reported in a named variety.

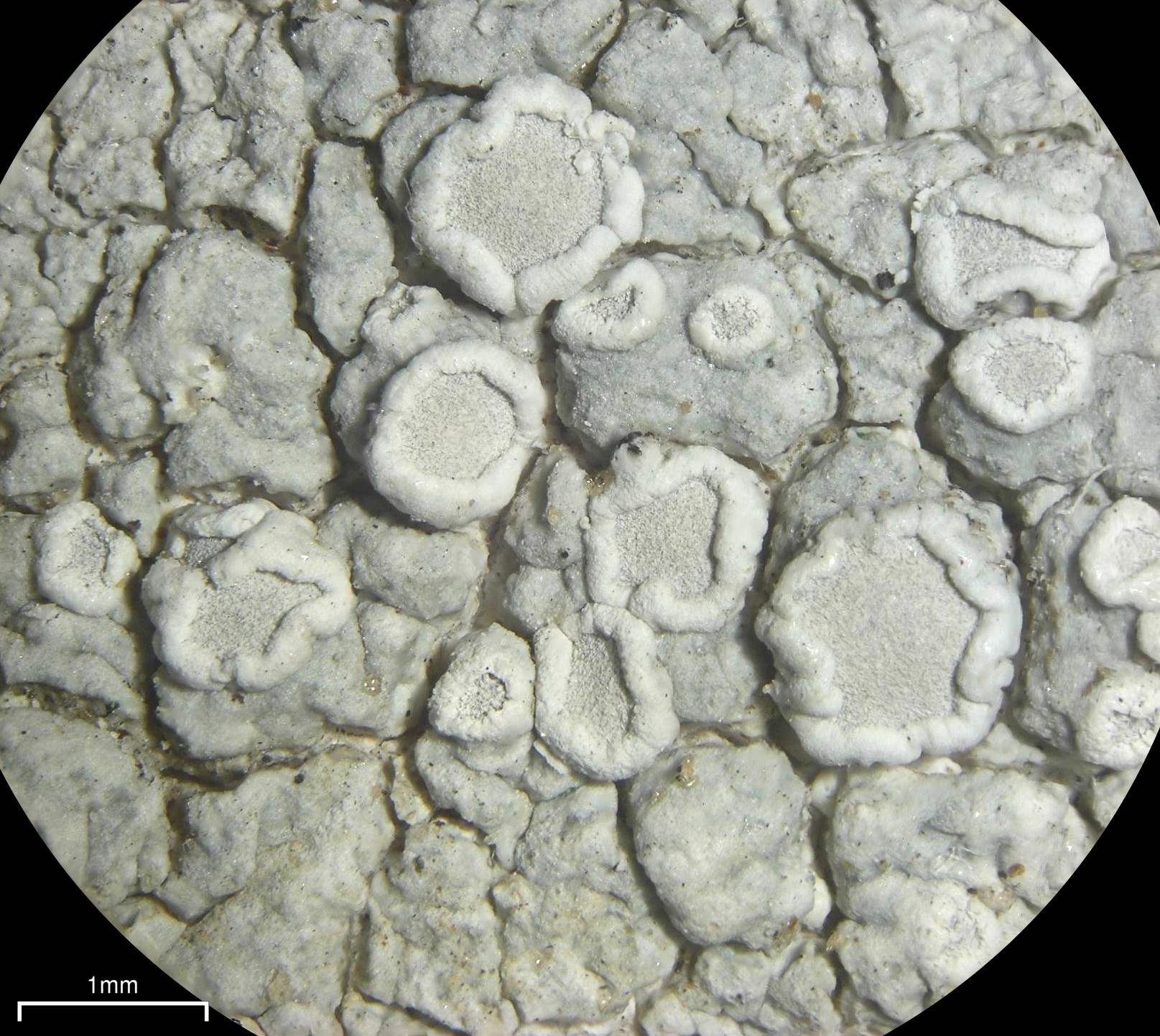
Closeup of apothecia; scale bar: 1 mm

Apothecia are about 0.5–2 mm across (occasionally to 3 mm) and are immersed in the thallus or only slightly raised; they develop singly or in clusters where neighbouring discs touch. The thalline margin is unbroken and may be finely scalloped to wavy or somewhat contorted, but it does not rise above the surrounding thallus surface. Discs range from pinkish to brown and are flat to convex, typically covered by a dense pale grey to blue-grey pruina (a powdery coating). Microscopically, the epithecium is pale brown to dark olive-brown and contains crystals that do not dissolve in K. The hymenium is about 80–90 μm tall, with mostly unbranched paraphyses around 2–3 μm in diameter (tips to about 3.5 μm). Ascospores measure roughly 9–14.5 × 5.5–7 μm (occasionally to 15 × 7.5 μm), and the conidia are slender and thread-like to slightly curved, about 14–25 × about 1 μm. In spot tests the thallus is C−, K+ (yellow), and the medulla is UV+ (yellow); the apothecial disc is C+ (yellow), Pd−, and UV+ (pale orange). Reported secondary metabolites include atranorin, chloroatranorin, sordidone, eugenitol, roccellic acid, and thiophanic acid.

== Habitat and distribution ==
Glaucomaria rupicola has an extensive geographic range, occurring in both the Northern and Southern Hemispheres; it is described as having a "bipolar to subcosmopolitan" distribution. In the Northern Hemisphere it is widespread across Europe, North America, and Asia. This lichen is also present in the Southern Hemisphere, with records from South America and other regions outside its northern range. It was reported for the first time in the Azores archipelago (North Atlantic Ocean) in 2024. Similarly, a 2025 survey documented the first record of G. rupicola in Gilgit-Baltistan, Pakistan (western Himalayas).

Glaucomaria rupicola is a saxicolous lichen that typically grows on hard, exposed rocky substrates. It shows a preference for siliceous (acidic) rocks such as granite. The species occurs from coastal areas at sea level to high mountain environments, demonstrating a wide altitudinal range. On wave-exposed seashores, it is frequently found in the xeric supralittoral zone just above the high-tide line, reflecting a strong maritime influence in its ecology. Inland, G. rupicola also colonises rock outcrops, boulders, and even occasionally man-made stone structures; it is common in montane and subalpine regions and can form extensive crusts in open, well-lit habitats. While it predominantly occurs on silica-rich rock, this lichen has also been recorded growing on calcareous (limestone) substrates in some locations. Each of its populations can exhibit ecological flexibility, but overall Glaucomaria rupicola grows in cool, exposed environments where few other lichens can dominate.

== Ecology ==
In some populations, the apothecia of Glaucomaria rupicola are frequently darkened by the lichenicolous (lichen-dwelling) fungus Arthonia varians. The thallus is also an occasional host for several other lichenicolous species. These include Phacographa glaucomaria, which forms small (<1 mm), black apothecia that are rounded, have a prominent exciple, and may occur in short arcs on the host (reported as rare). Other colonists reported from G. rupicola include Lambiella insularis (producing grey-brown to brown, sometimes olivaceous areoles and described as locally common in some areas) and Rinodina insularis. Additional lichenicolous fungi noted on this host are Sclerococcum montagnei, the broadly opportunistic Marchandiomyces corallinus, and Muellerella pygmaea.

== See also ==
- List of lichens named by Carl Linnaeus
