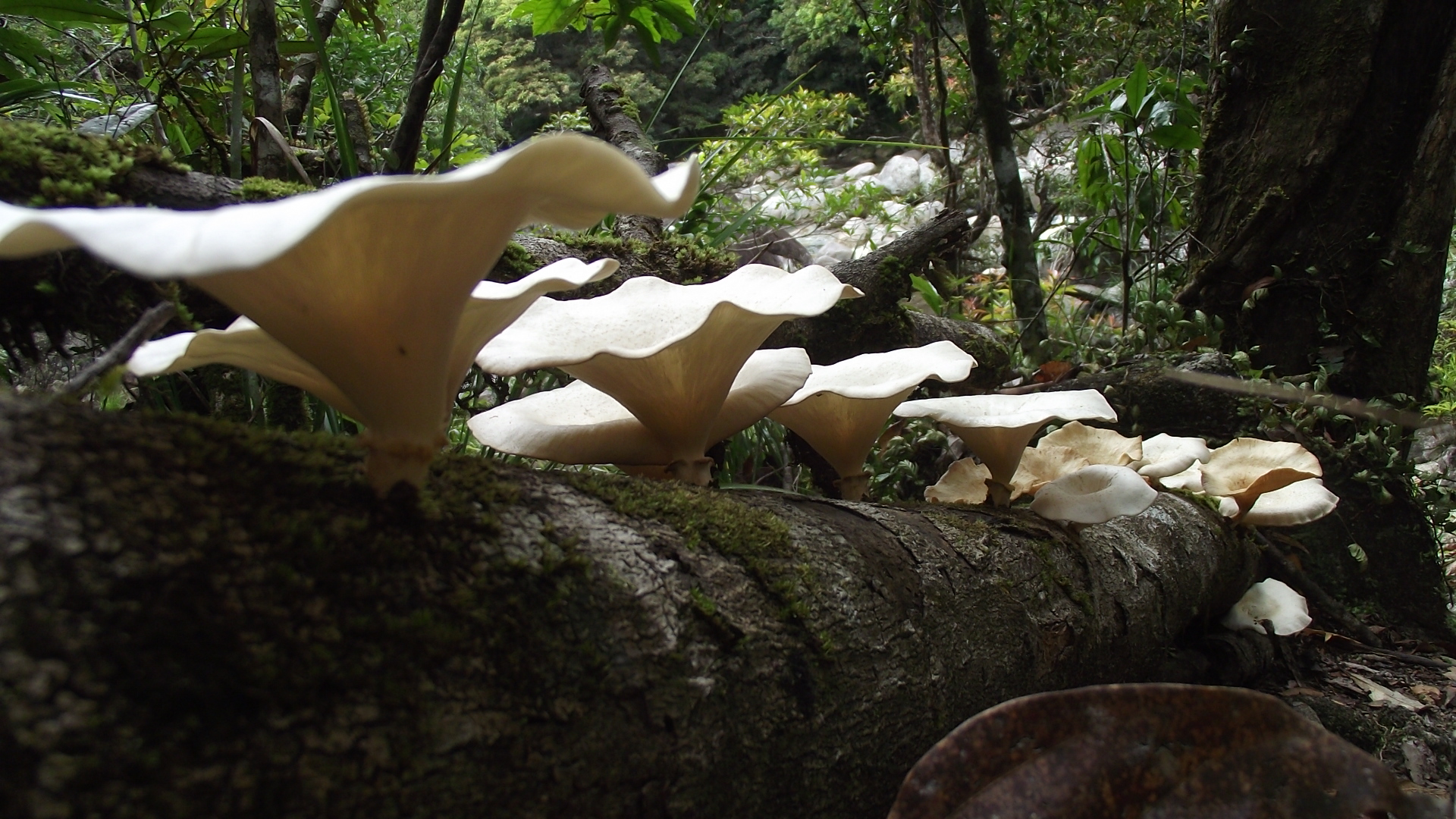

Scientific classification
- Kingdom: Fungi
- Division: Basidiomycota
- Class: Agaricomycetes
- Order: Polyporales
- Family: Polyporaceae
- Genus: Lentinus
- Species: L. sajor-caju

Binomial name
- Lentinus sajor-caju (Fr.) Fr. (1838)

Synonyms
- Agaricus sajor-caju Fr.; Pleurotus sajor-caju (Fr.) Sing.

= Lentinus sajor-caju =

Species of fungus

Lentinus sajor-caju
- Mycological characteristics
- Gills on hymenium
- Cap is infundibuliform
- Hymenium is decurrent
- Stipe has a ring
- Spore print is white
- Ecology is saprotrophic
- Edibility is choice

Lentinus sajor-caju (formerly Pleurotus sajor-caju) is a species of mushroom from Polyporaceae family.

== Taxonomy ==
The current name Lentinus sajor-caju was named by Elias Magnus Fries in 1838.

The name Pleurotus sajor-caju is often incorrectly used by cultivator-mycologists for Pleurotus pulmonarius, a commonly cultivated species of oyster mushroom.

== Description ==
- Pileus: 4–8 cm, infundibuliform, white to yellowish brown to light brown
- Gills: Decurrent
- Spore print: White
- Stipe: White and short, with an annulus (ring)
- Odour: Not distinct

=== Comparison to Pleurotus pulmonarius ===
- L. sajor-caju has an annulus (ring on the stipe), P. pulmonarius has a bare stipe.
- L. sajor-caju is composed of trimitic or dimitic hyphae. P. pulmonarius is monomitic.

== Ecology and habitat ==
This species is saprophytic, and grows on rotten wood in various regions, including India, China, Thailand, Malaysia and Tanzania.
