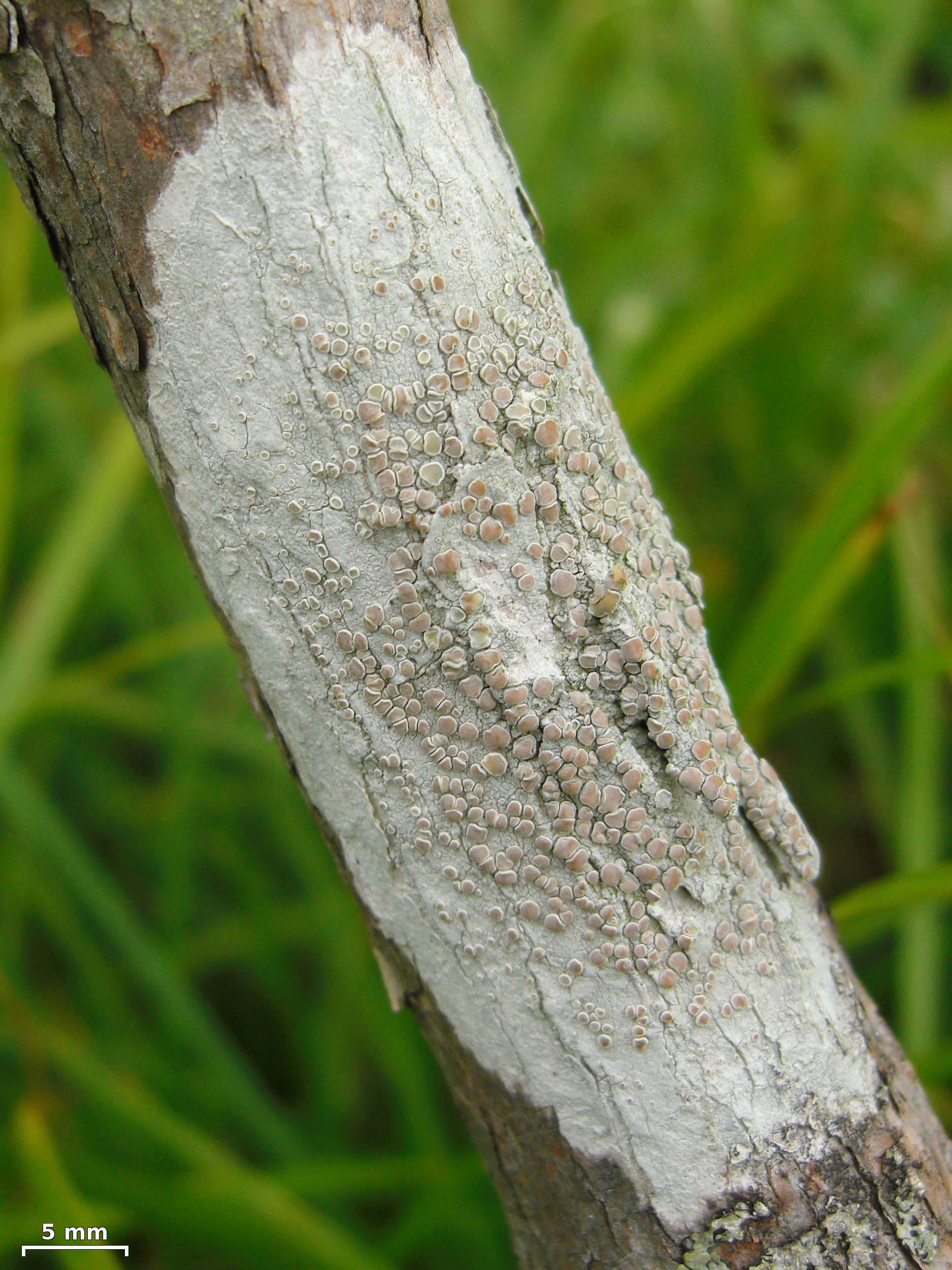

Conservation status
- Apparently Secure (NatureServe)

Scientific classification
- Kingdom: Fungi
- Division: Ascomycota
- Class: Lecanoromycetes
- Order: Lecanorales
- Family: Lecanoraceae
- Genus: Lecanora
- Species: L. caesiorubella

Binomial name
- Lecanora caesiorubella Ach. (1810)

Synonyms
- Verrucaria cancriformis Hoffm. (1796); Parmelia caesiorubella (Ach.) Fr. (1846); Patellaria caesiorubella (Ach.) Trevis. (1852); Lecanora leucoma Nyl. (1864); Lecanora glaucomodes Nyl. (1876); Lecanora pulverata Stirt. (1881); Lecanora cancriformis (Hoffm.) Vain. (1898); Lecanora australiensis Zahlbr. (1928); Lecanora pallida var. caesiorubella (Ach.) H.Magn. (1955); Lecanora caesiorubella subsp. glaucomodes (Nyl.) Imshaug & Brodo (1966)

= Lecanora caesiorubella =

Species of lichen

Lecanora caesiorubella is a species of crustose lichen in the family Lecanoraceae.

== See also ==
- List of Lecanora species
