= Lembosina =

Scientific classification
- Kingdom: Fungi
- Division: Ascomycota
- Class: Dothideomycetes
- Order: Asterinales
- Family: Asterinaceae
- Genus: Lembosina; Theiss.

Type species
- Lembosina aulographoides (E. Bommer, M. Rousseau & Sacc.) Theiss.

Genus of fungi

Lembosina is a genus of fungi in the Asterinaceae family. The relationship of this taxon to other taxa within the class is unknown (incertae sedis), and it has not yet been placed with certainty into any order.
