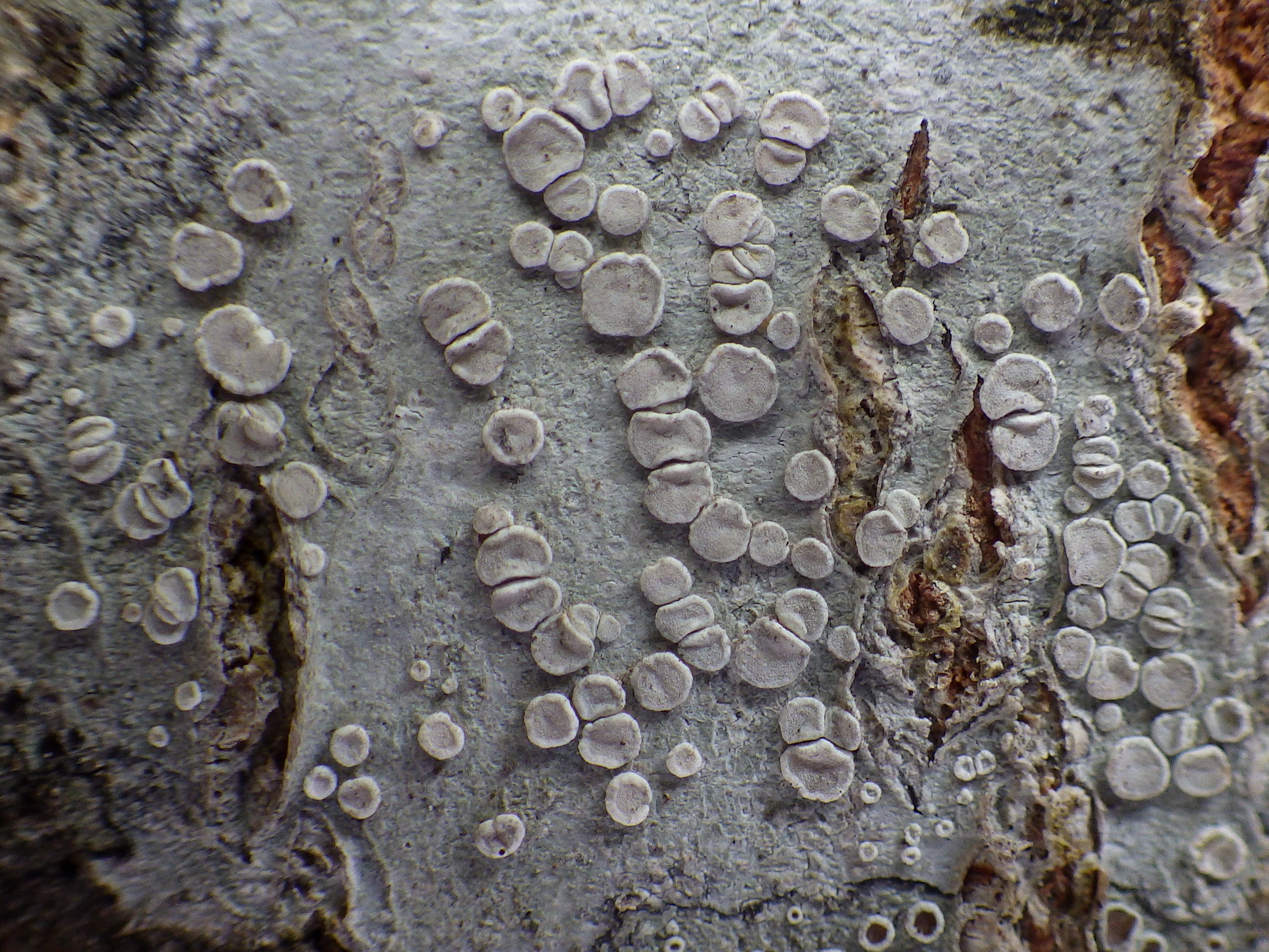

Scientific classification
- Domain: Eukaryota
- Kingdom: Fungi
- Division: Ascomycota
- Class: Lecanoromycetes
- Order: Lecanorales
- Family: Lecanoraceae
- Genus: Lecanora
- Species: L. albella

Binomial name
- Lecanora albella (Pers.) Ach. (1810)

Synonyms
- Lichen albellus Pers. (1794)

= Lecanora albella =

Species of lichen

Lecanora albella is a species of crustose lichen belonging to the family Lecanoraceae.

It has a cosmopolitan distribution.
