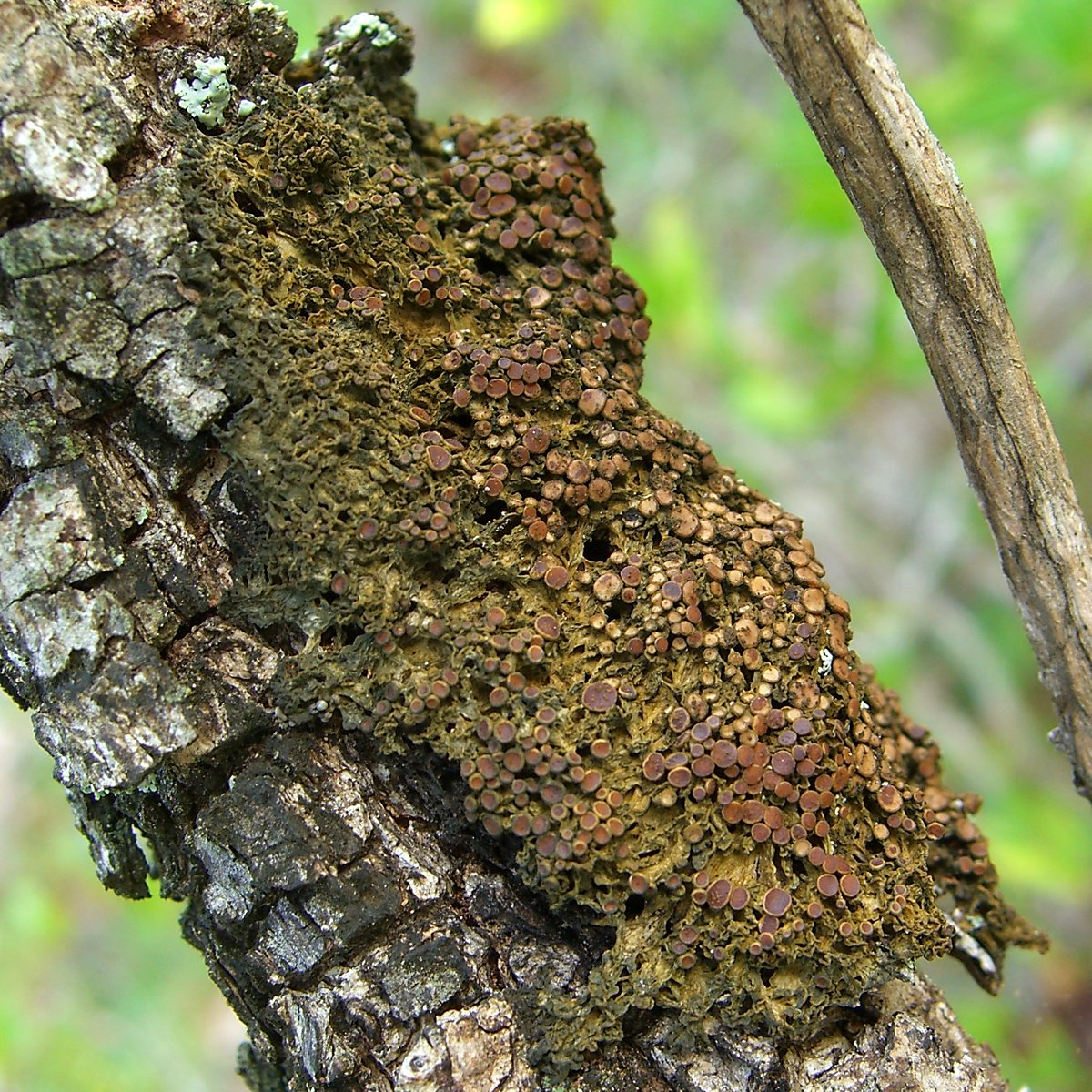

Conservation status
- Apparently Secure (NatureServe)

Scientific classification
- Kingdom: Fungi
- Division: Ascomycota
- Class: Lecanoromycetes
- Order: Peltigerales
- Family: Collemataceae
- Genus: Leptogium
- Species: L. chloromelum

Binomial name
- Leptogium chloromelum (Ach.) Nyl. (1858)

Synonyms
- Parmelia chloromela Ach. (1803); Lichen chloromelus (Ach.) Sw. (1806); Collema chloromelum (Ach.) Ach. (1810)

= Leptogium chloromelum =

Species of lichen

Leptogium chloromelum, the ruffled jellyskin, is a species of foliose (leafy) lichen in the family Collemataceae. Originally described in 1803 from specimens collected in the mountains of Jamaica, this bark-dwelling lichen is characterized by its distinctively wrinkled, lead-gray to greenish surface with radiating lobes. The species has a wide distribution across the American tropics, ranging from the southeastern United States south to Brazil and Peru, where it commonly grows on the bark of various hardwood trees.

== Taxonomy ==
Leptogium chloromelum was originally described as Parmelia chloromela by Erik Acharius in his 1803 work Methodus qua omnes detectos lichenes. Acharius based his description on a specimen collected by Olof Swartz from the bark of trees in the mountains of Jamaica, where Swartz had noted it growing on the highest peaks. In his brief Latin description, Acharius characterized the species by its gelatinous thallus that becomes membranous when dry, with a folded and wrinkled surface that is dark greenish-black above and reddish shields with warty margins. William Nylander reclassified the taxon in 1858, transferring it to the genus Leptogium. The original type specimens collected by Swartz are housed in herbaria in Helsinki and Uppsala, though their condition has been noted as poor. There has been some confusion regarding the type material over the years; one researcher in 1964 mistakenly believed the original specimens were lost and designated a replacement specimen (neotype) from Mexico, but this action was invalidated when the original material was subsequently located.

== Description ==
The species is characterized by its distinctive ridged thallus structure and reproductive bodies positioned near the margins, features that align it with a group of related Leptogium species. Leptogium chloromelum forms patches 2–7 cm across with a lead gray to greenish upper surface and paler underside. The body of the lichen consists of numerous radiating lobes that branch and reconnect with each other. These lobes are elongated and 1–4 mm wide, with thickened margins and tips that remain unbroken. The surface has a distinctly wrinkled appearance, with the most prominent wrinkles running lengthwise along the lobes rather than across them.

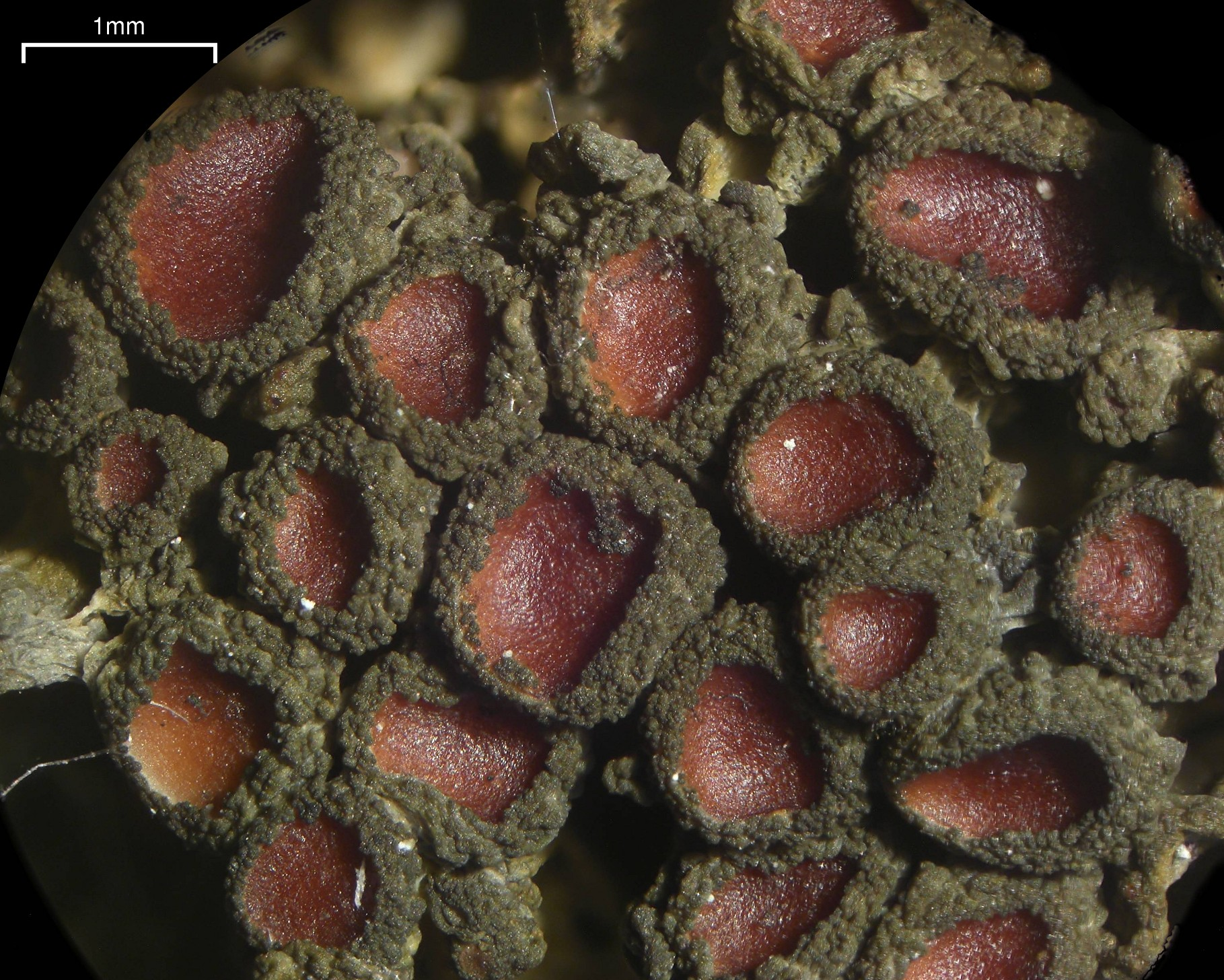
Close-up of the characteristic red-brown apothecia positioned on the thickened, wrinkled lobe margins; scale bar = 1 mm

The lobes are quite thick (125–500 μm) and have a simple internal structure consisting of a single layer of irregularly rounded cells about 4–9 μm in diameter. A second cortical layer develops only beneath the reproductive structures. The fungal threads (hyphae) are 2–4 μm in diameter and loosely interwoven, while the algal partner forms spherical cells 3–5 μm across arranged in long chains throughout the lichen body (thallus), though they are most abundant near the upper and lower surfaces.

The spore-producing structures (apothecia) are common and sit directly on the thickened lobe margins without stalks. These disc-shaped structures are 0.5–2.5 mm wide with concave to nearly flat, red-brown surfaces. The rim around each disc matches the wrinkled texture of the main thallus. The spore-containing sacs (asci) are club-shaped to cylindrical and measure 80–120 × 12–23 μm. Each sac contains eight colorless ascospores that are elliptical with pointed ends, measuring 20–30 × 9–12 μm, and divided by 3–5 cross-walls and 0–1 lengthwise divisions.

== Habitat and distribution ==
Leptogium chloromelum is found throughout the American tropics, with its range extending across the southeastern United States and reaching north to New England, and west to Arkansas and Texas. This bark-dwelling lichen grows on various tree species including several types of hardwoods and oak, and has occasionally been found growing on cedar and, in rare instances, on rock surfaces.

The species is relatively common in parts of Brazil, particularly in the state of Mato Grosso do Sul, where it has been found growing on tree bark in various municipalities. The species has a broader distribution within Brazil, having been recorded from several states including Mato Grosso and Rio Grande do Sul. Leptogium chloromelum has also been documented in Peru.
