= Leptosphaerella =

Scientific classification
- Kingdom: Fungi
- Division: Ascomycota
- Class: Sordariomycetes
- Informal group: Sordariomycetes incertae sedis
- Genus: Leptosphaerella; Speg. (1909)

Type species
- Leptosphaerella fagaricola Speg. (1912)

Genus of fungi

Leptosphaerella is a genus of fungi in the class Sordariomycetes. The relationship of this taxon to other taxa within the class is unknown (incertae sedis).
