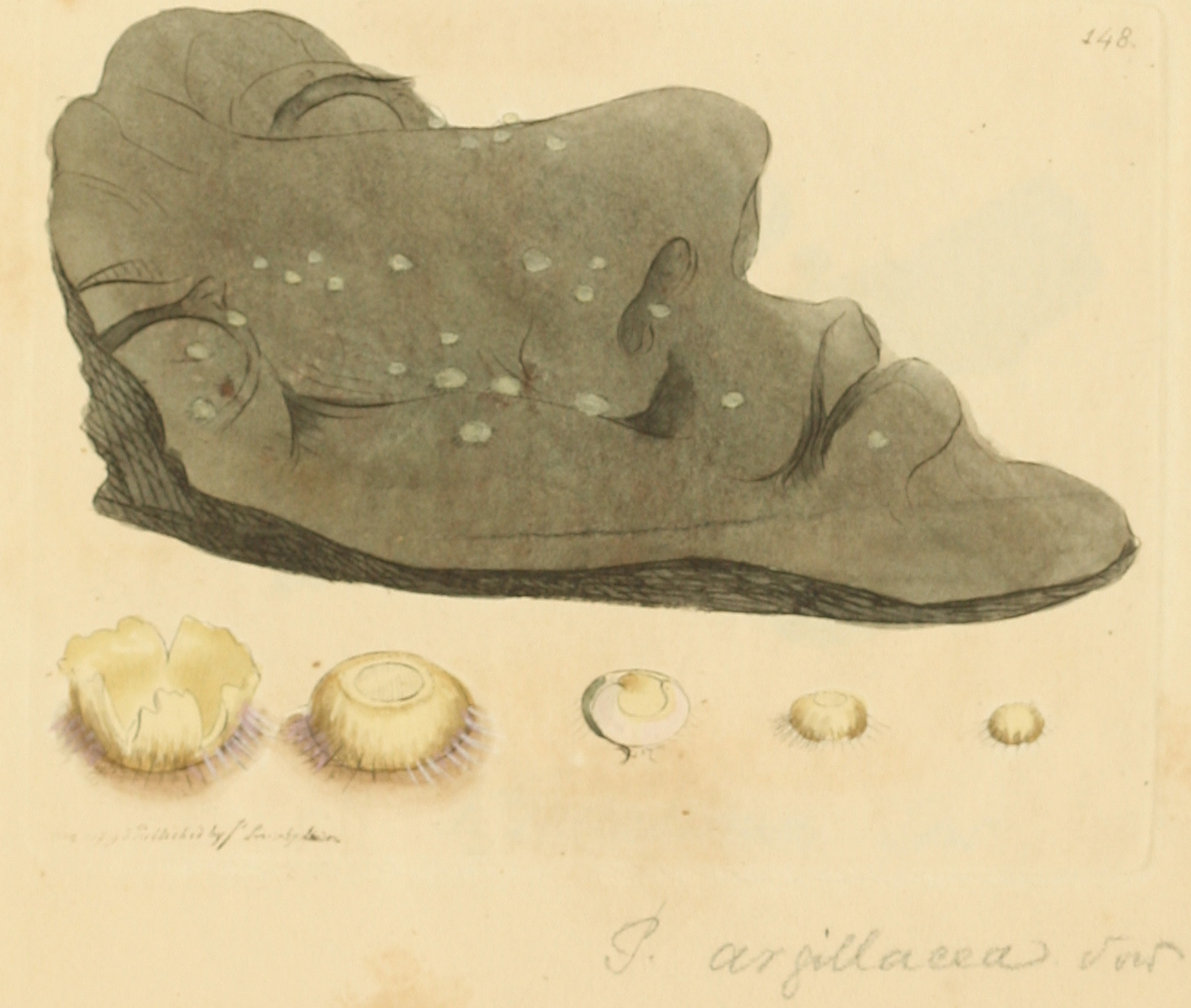
- Lachnea argillacea

Scientific classification
- Domain: Eukaryota
- Kingdom: Fungi
- Division: Ascomycota
- Class: Pezizomycetes
- Order: Pezizales
- Family: Pyronemataceae
- Genus: Lachnea (Fr.) Gillet, 1880

= Lachnea =

Genus of fungi

Lachnea is a genus of fungi belonging to the family Pyronemataceae. The genus was first described in 1822 as Peziza ser. Lachnea by Elias Magnus Fries. This was elevated to genus status by Claude Casimir Gillet in 1880.

The species of this genus are found in Eurasia.

== Species ==
Species:

- Lachnea acerina Velen.
- Lachnea albobadia (Saut.) Rehm
- Lachnea alboflava (Saut.) Sacc.
