= Samuel Liljeblad =

Swedish botanist and economist

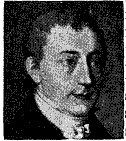
Samuel Liljeblad

Samuel Liljeblad (20 December 1761, Mösjöholt, Södra Vi, Kalmar län – 1 April 1815, Uppsala) was a Swedish botanist and economist. At school in Vimmerby and at Linköping's Gymnasium, Liljeblad studied natural history. He became an avid plant collector encouraged by, among others, a physician in Linköping, Johan Otto Hagström (1716–1792), who was one of the Apostles of Linnaeus. Liljeblad matriculated in 1782 at Uppsala University, majored in economics, and graduated there with a master's degree in 1788. (In Uppsala University's Faculty of Philosophy, economics was the closest match to botany.)

== Career ==
In May 1778 he embarked with Carl Birger Rutström and Barthold Rudolf Ekholm on a botanical expedition which lasted a little more than three months. They travelled along the coastal road with Haparanda and Tornio as their first destinations. By carriage and boat they travelled along the Tornio River to Jukkasjärvi and then out on Torneträsk (the sixth largest lake in Sweden). The three young men went farther north than any botanist since Olof Rudbeck the Younger's 1695 expedition. On the way home, Liljeblad's expedition made excursions to Kolari and Kemi in Finland. He kept a diary throughout the expedition. The diary entitled Diarium för en Lappsk Resa Anträdd d. 29 maji 1788 (Diary for a Lapland Journey) was published for the first time in the 1990s.

Upon his return to Uppsala, Liljebad began to study medicine, although his primary interest was botany. On Carl Peter Thunberg's recommendation, he was appointed in 1790 as a substitute botanical demonstrator at Uppsala University. His duties included leading botanical excursions. As an aid for the participants, he published in 1791 Svenska ört-slagen on Swedish medicinal herbs with explanations of botanical terms and a description of the plant genera in Swedish. In 1792 he published was Utkast til en svensk flora, which was a translation into Swedish of the Latin of Linnaeus' Flora Suecica, but with an increased number of species and arranged according to a Linnaean botanical sexual system. The 1792 book became important as a textbook widely used by both professionals and amateurs for a few decades, perhaps because it made plant studies more accessible for people ignorant of Latin. The book had a 2nd edition in 1798 and a 3rd edition in 1816, the last edited by Liljeblad's student Johan Haqvin Wallman (1792–1853) assisted by Elias Magnus Fries. Liljeblad created several botanical terms which to a large extent are still in use, while the plant names he introduces have been less successful. He received his medical doctorate in 1793.

During the summers of from 1789 to 1799, Liljeblad visited many Swedish locations for plant collecting. At Uppsala University he was appointed in 1796 an adjunct professor of economics and in 1802 a full professor of economics. In 1810 he officiated as rector of the university.

In 1809 Liljeblad married Johanna Christina Ekfors.

== Selected publications ==
- Utkast till en svensk Flora (2nd ed.). J. F. Edman. 1798.
