= Thiophanic acid =

Chemical compound found in some lichens

Names
- IUPAC name 2,4,5,7-tetrachloro-1,3,6-trihydroxy-8-methylxanthen-9-one
- Other names Thiophanic acid

Identifiers
CAS Number	7584-33-0
3D model (JSmol)	Interactive image
ChEBI	CHEBI:144240
ChemSpider	288471
PubChem CID	325789
CompTox Dashboard (EPA)	DTXSID60315526
- InChI: InChI=1S/C14H6Cl4O5/c1-2-3-9(19)4-10(20)6(16)12(22)8(18)14(4)23-13(3)7(17)11(21)5(2)15/h20-22H,1H3 Key: MYBIAUJNAXMGTF-UHFFFAOYSA-N
- SMILES: CC1=C2C(=C(C(=C1Cl)O)Cl)OC3=C(C(=C(C(=C3C2=O)O)Cl)O)Cl

Properties
Chemical formula	C_{14}H_{6}Cl_{4}O_{5}
Molar mass	396.00 g·mol^{−1}
Melting point	242–243 °C (468–469 °F; 515–516 K)
- Except where otherwise noted, data are given for materials in their standard state (at 25 °C [77 °F], 100 kPa). Infobox references

Thiophanic acid is a chlorine-containing xanthone compound first isolated from the lichen Glaucomaria rupicola in 1898. Its molecular structure, definitively established in 1966, consists of a xanthone core with four chlorine atoms and three hydroxyl groups, giving it the chemical formula C_{14}H_{6}Cl_{4}O_{5}. The compound serves an important biological role in lichens as a UV-protective agent, absorbing harmful UVA radiation while allowing visible light to pass through for photosynthesis. It exhibits complex growth-regulatory effects on plants. As one of the few naturally occurring chlorinated xanthones, thiophanic acid is also used as a chemical marker for identifying and classifying lichen species. Several methods have been developed for its chemical synthesis, with the first complete synthesis achieved in 1968.

== History ==
Thiophanic acid was first isolated in 1898 by Oswald Hesse from the lichen Lecanora sordida (now known as Glaucomaria rupicola). Initially, it was considered an unusual lichen metabolite as it did not clearly belong to any of the known structural categories of lichen products at that time. Unlike plant-derived xanthones which typically have 1,3,5- or 1,3,7-trihydroxy patterns, thiophanic acid features a characteristic 1,3,6-trihydroxy-8-methylxanthone structure that would later prove typical of lichen-derived compounds. Some confusion arose in 1937 when researchers examining an Irish specimen of L. sordida isolated a different compound with a melting point of 258–260 °C (496–500 °F), which they mistakenly identified as thiophanic acid. This compound was later correctly identified as sordidone, a distinct chlorine-containing metabolite. In 1966, Siegfried Huneck definitively established thiophanic acid's structure as 2,4,5,7-tetrachloro-1,3,6-trihydroxy-8-methylxanthone, placing it firmly within the xanthone class of natural products. This identification helped establish thiophanic acid as part of a growing group of halogen-containing fungal metabolites discovered in lichens. The compound was later found to serve a crucial biological role in lichens as a UV-protective compound, absorbing light in the UVA range (315–400 nm) without blocking visible light needed for photosynthesis. This discovery helped explain why thiophanic acid represents a unique category of chlorinated xanthones – a class of compounds that are almost exclusively produced by lichens through specialised biosynthetic pathways.

== Properties ==
Thiophanic acid belongs to a family of chlorinated xanthone compounds produced by lichens. The ultraviolet absorbance maxima (λ_{max}) has three peaks at 248, 320 and 360 nm. In the infrared spectrum, significant peaks indicative of the functional groups occur at 670–790 cm^{−1} (C–S stretching), at 1070–1180 cm^{−1} (C–O stretch), at 1390–1440 cm^{−1} (C–H bends), 1570 cm^{−1} (C–H bends), 1632 cm^{−1} (C=O stretching of carboxylic acid), and 3300–3550 cm^{−1} (O–H stretch). Thiophanic acid's molecular formula is C_{14}H_{6}Cl_{4}O_{5}; it has a molecular mass of 396.0 grams per mole. In its purified form, it exists as yellow needles with a melting point of 242–243 °C (468–469 °F). Several chemical tests can be used to identify thiophanic acid: it reacts with sodium hypochlorite (NaOCl) to produce an orange colour and with iron(III) chloride (FeCl_{3}) in ethanol to make a green-black colour.

== Occurrence ==
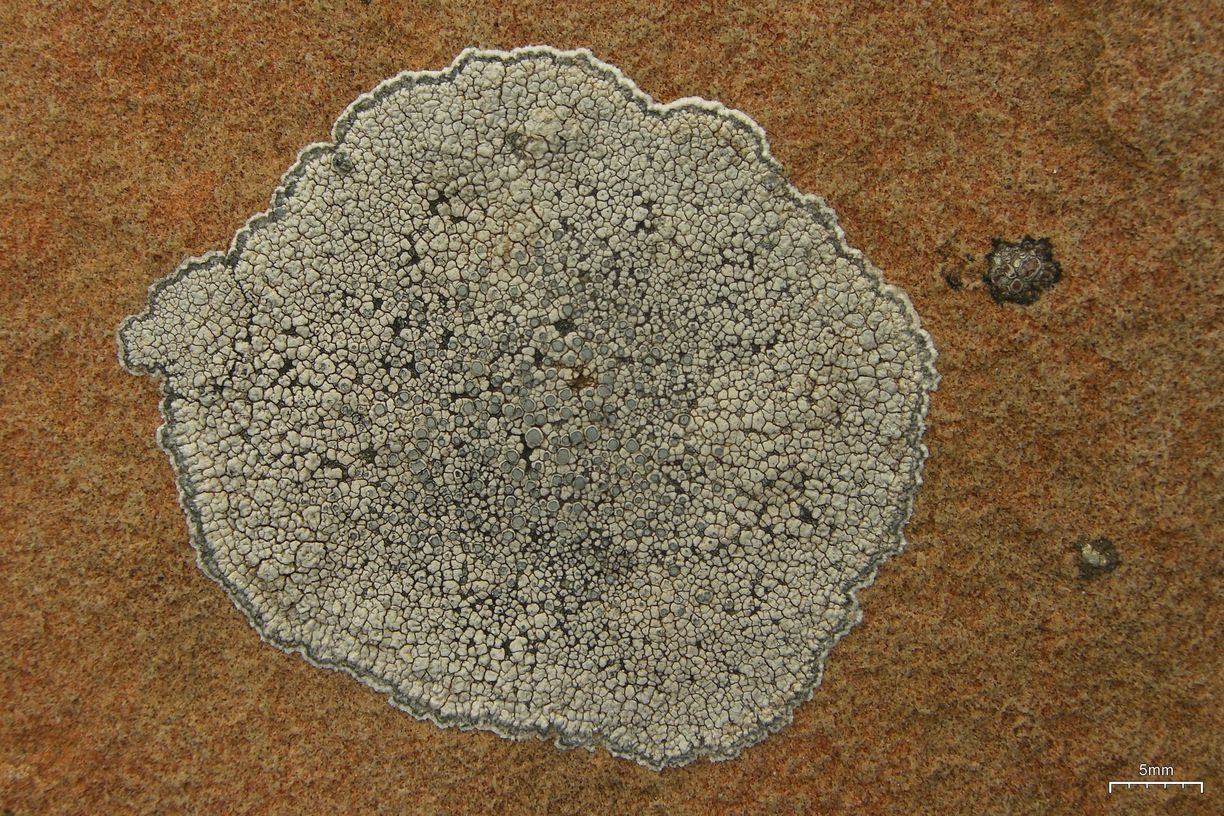
Thiophanic acid was first isolated from the crustose lichen species Glaucomaria rupicola.

Thiophanic acid is biosynthesised from a single linear polyketide chain which cyclizes to form the characteristic xanthone structure. The distinctive chlorination pattern and hydroxyl group positions result from secondary biosynthetic steps unique to lichen-forming fungi. These biosynthetic capabilities allow lichens to produce chlorinated xanthones that are rarely found in other organisms. It occurs in several lichens, including Byssoloma melanodiscocarpum, Calicium hyperelloides, Lecanora arae-frigidae, Lepraria tiinae, and Palicella lueckingii.

== Synthesis ==
In 1968, researchers at the University of Delhi reported a synthesis of thiophanic acid starting from norlichexanthone. Their method involved methylation to form a trimethyl ether, followed by chlorination using chlorine in carbon tetrachloride, and finally demethylation using aluminium chloride in benzene. The resulting yellow crystalline product had a melting point of 243–244 °C and was confirmed to be identical to natural thiophanic acid isolated from the lichen Glaucomaria rupicola through matching physical and spectral properties.

Another synthesis of thiophanic acid, published in 1971 by researchers at the University of Sheffield, involved a multi-step process starting with dichloroeverninic acid. This compound was reacted with phloroglucinol (a type of phenol) in the presence of zinc chloride and phosphorus oxychloride to form a xanthone structure. The resulting compound was then chlorinated using sulphuryl chloride and finally demethylated (removal of a methyl group) using pyridine hydrochloride to yield thiophanic acid. The synthetic product was confirmed to be identical to the natural compound isolated from the lichen Glaucomaria rupicola. This synthesis successfully replicated the distinctive substitution pattern that makes thiophanic acid an important chemotaxonomic marker – part of the characteristic set of secondary metabolites used to identify and classify lichen species. Two alternative syntheses were later developed: one involving direct chlorination of norlichexanthone in acetic acid, and another using chlorination and demethylation of trimethoxy-methylxanthone.

== Bioactivity ==
Thiophanic acid has been investigated for its biological activities, including fungicidal activity. The compound exhibited complex growth-regulatory (allelopathic) effects on various plants. In cress root growth tests, thiophanic acid strongly inhibited growth at higher concentrations (10^{−3} M) but promoted growth at lower concentrations (10^{−6} M to 10^{−7} M). When tested on plants grown under natural day-night conditions, thiophanic acid caused seedlings to develop pale yellow or yellow cotyledons. The compound also showed variable effects on oat seedling growth depending on concentration.
