= Chloroatranorin =

Names
- IUPAC name (3-Hydroxy-4-methoxycarbonyl-2,5-dimethylphenyl) 5-chloro-3-formyl-2,4-dihydroxy-6-methylbenzoate
- Other names 5-Chloroatranorin

Identifiers
CAS Number	479-16-3
3D model (JSmol)	Interactive image
ChEBI	CHEBI:144138
ChemSpider	61379
PubChem CID	68065
UNII	433PEB1G7C
CompTox Dashboard (EPA)	DTXSID50197318
- InChI: InChI=1S/C19H17ClO8/c1-7-5-11(8(2)15(22)12(7)18(25)27-4)28-19(26)13-9(3)14(20)17(24)10(6-21)16(13)23/h5-6,22-24H,1-4H3 Key: ABZLZZCDSLOCNF-UHFFFAOYSA-N
- SMILES: CC1=CC(=C(C(=C1C(=O)OC)O)C)OC(=O)C2=C(C(=C(C(=C2O)C=O)O)Cl)C

Properties
Chemical formula	C_{19}H_{17}ClO_{8}
Molar mass	408.79 g·mol^{−1}
Melting point	208–210 °C (406–410 °F; 481–483 K)
- Except where otherwise noted, data are given for materials in their standard state (at 25 °C [77 °F], 100 kPa). Infobox references

Chloroatranorin is a chemical compound with the molecular formula C_{19}H_{17}ClO_{8}. It is a secondary metabolite produced by a variety of lichens and is a member of the depside class of compounds. It was first isolated from the oakmoss Evernia prunastri and characterized in 1934. It is the most common chlorine-containing depside in lichens, and has been identified in dozens of lichen species.

It is a chlorinated derivative of atranorin and the two are frequently found together in the same source. Ramault and colleagues described an improved method to separate the two compounds using thin-layer chromatography.

== Properties ==
Chloroatranorin is a member of the class of chemical compounds called depsides. Its IUPAC name is (3-hydroxy-4-methoxycarbonyl-2,5-dimethylphenyl) 5-chloro-3-formyl-2,4-dihydroxy-6-methylbenzoate. The absorbance maxima (λ_{max}) in the ultraviolet spectrum (in methanol solution) are 213, 252, and 282 nm. Its peaks in the infrared spectrum occur at 710, 764, 790, 810, 850, 904, 942, 992, 1030, 1080, 1115, 1160, 1180, 1270, 1285, 1360, 1385, 1408, 1445, 1582, 1650, 3000, and 3500 cm^{−1}. Chloroatranorin's molecular formula is C_{19}H_{17}ClO_{8}; it has a molecular mass of 408.78 grams per mole. In its purified crystalline form, its melting point is 208–208.5 °C (406.4–407.3 °F).

Chloroatranorin has been studied for its potential antioxidant, antimicrobial, and anticancer properties.
