= List of fungi of South Africa – B =

This is an alphabetical list of the fungal taxa as recorded from South Africa. Currently accepted names have been appended.

== Ba ==
Genus: Bacidia De Not. 1846 (Lichens)

- Bacidia aemula (Stizenb.) Zahlbr. 1926
- Bacidia amylothelia Vain. 1926
- Bacidia bacillifera (Nyl.) Branth & Rostr. 1869
- Bacidia beckhausii Körb. 1860
- Bacidia beckhausii var. stenospora (Hepp) Arnold 1871 f. acutata Zahlbr.
- Bacidia capreolina (Stizenb.) Zahlbr. 1926
- Bacidia caruncula (Stizenb.) Zahlbr. 1926
- Bacidia chlorophaeata (Nyl.) Zahlbr. 1926
- Bacidia cyrtocheila (Stizenb.) Zahlbr. 1926
- Bacidia effusa var. intermedia (Hepp ex Stizenb.) Zahlbr. 1926
- Bacidia endoleuca (Nyl.) J. Kickx f. 1867
- Bacidia endoleucella (Stizenb.) Zahlbr. 1926
- Bacidia epicyanea Vain. 1926
- Bacidia friesiana var. norrlinii (Lamy) Vain. 1922
- Bacidia fuscorubella (Hoffm.) Bausch 1869 accepted as Bacidia polychroa (Th. Fr.) Körb., (1860)
- Bacidia heteroloma Zahlbr. f. firmior Vain*
- Bacidia inconsequens (Nyl.) Zahlbr. 1926
- Bacidia inconveniens (Nyl.) Zahlbr. 1926
- Bacidia intermedia Hampe ex A. Massal. 1861
- Bacidia laurocerasi var. amylothelia (Vain.) Zahlbr. 1926
- Bacidia leucostephana (Stizenb.) Zahlbr. 1926
- Bacidia lugubris (Sommerf.) Zahlbr. 1905 accepted as Schaereria lugubris (A. Massal.) Körb., (1855)
- Bacidia luteola (Schrad.) Mudd 1861 accepted as Bacidia rubella (Hoffm.) A. Massal., (1852)
- Bacidia luteola f. chlorotica (Ach.) Zahlbr. 1926 accepted as Pseudosagedia chlorotica (Ach.) Hafellner & Kalb, (1995)
- Bacidia luteola f. conspondens (Nyl.) Zahlbr. 1926
- Bacidia medialis (Tuck.) Zahlbr. 1927
- Bacidia millegrana (Taylor) Zahlbr. 1888
- Bacidia polychroa (Th. Fr.) Körb., (1860) reported as Bacidia fuscorubella (Hoffm.) Bausch 1869
- Bacidia proposita (Nyl.) Zahlbr. 1926
- Bacidia rubella (Hoffm.) A. Massal., (1852) reported as Bacidia luteola (Schrad.) Mudd 1861
- Bacidia rufata (Stizenb.) Zahlbr. 1926
- Bacidia sabuletorum (Schreb.) Lettau 1912 accepted as Bilimbia sabuletorum (Schreb.) Arnold, (1869)
- Bacidia stupposa (A. Massal.) Zahlbr. 1905
- Bacidia subluteola (Nyl.) Zahlbr. 1902
- Bacidia subspadicea (Müll. Arg.) Zahlbr. 1926
- Bacidia trifaria (Stizenb.) Zahlbr. 1926

Genus: Bactridium Kunze 1817

- Bactridium flavum Kunze 1817

Genus: Baeomyces Pers. 1794 (Lichens)

- Baeomyces capensis Taylor 1847
- Baeomyces monocarpus (Ach.) Ach. 1803
- Baeomyces roseus Pers. 1794 accepted as Dibaeis rosea (Pers.) Clem., (1909)

Genus: Bagnisiopsis Theiss. & Syd. 1915, accepted as Coccodiella Hara, (1910)

- Bagnisiopsis disciformis (Wint).*

Genus: Balansia Speg. 1885

- Balansia cynodontis Syd. 1935
- Balansia trachypogonis Doidge 1948
- Balansia sp.

Genus: Balladyna Racib. 1900

- Balladyna leonensis Syd. 1939
- Balladyna tenuis Hansf. 1941
- Balladyna ugandensis Syd. 1939
- Balladyna velutina (Berk. & M.A. Curtis) Höhn. 1910

Genus: Balladynastrum Hansf. 1941, accepted as Balladynopsis Theiss. & Syd., (1918)

- Balladynastrum glabrum Hansf. 1946 accepted as Balladynocallia glabra (Hansf.) Bat., (1965)

Genus: Balladynella Theiss. & Syd. 1918, accepted as Dysrhynchis Clem., (1909)

- Balladynella confusa (Doidge) Hansf. 1946 accepted as Rizalia confusa Doidge, (1924)

Genus: Balladynocallia Bat. 1965

- Balladynocallia glabra (Hansf.) Bat., (1965) reported as Balladynastrum glabrum Hansf. 1946

Genus: Basisporium Molliard 1902, accepted as Nigrospora Zimm., (1902)

- Basisporium gallarum Molliard 1902 accepted as Nigrospora oryzae (Berk. & Broome) Petch, (1924)

Genus: Battarrea Pers. 1801

- Battarrea diguetii Pat. & Har. 1896 [as diqueti] accepted as Battarreoides diguetii (Pat. & Har.) R. Heim & T. Herrera, (1962)
- Battarrea phalloides Pers.
- Battarrea stevenii Fr.

Genus; Battarreoides T. Herrera 1953

- Battarreoides diguetii (Pat. & Har.) R. Heim & T. Herrera, (1962) reported as Battarrea diguetii Pat. & Har. 1896 [as diqueti]

Genus: Baumiella Henn. 1903, accepted as Leptosphaeria Ces. & De Not. (1863)

- Baumiella caespitosa Henn. 1903

== Be ==
Genus: Beauveria Vuill. 1912

- Beauveria bassiana (Bals.-Criv.) Vuill. 1912
- Beauveria globulifera (Speg.) F. Picard 1914 accepted as Beauveria bassiana (Bals.-Criv.) Vuill., (1912)

Genus: Belonidium Mont. & Durieu 1848, accepted as Lachnum Retz., (1769)

Synonymy:

- Belonidium capense (Kalchbr. & Cooke) Sacc. 1889,

Genus: Beniowskia Racib. 1900

- Beniowskia penniseti Wakef., (1916), accepted as Beniowskia sphaeroidea (Kalchbr. & Cooke) E.W. Mason, (1928))
- Beniowskia sphaeroidea (Kalchbr. & Cooke) E.W. Mason, (1928)),

== Bi ==
Genus: Biatora (Lichens)

- Biatora decipiens (Hedw.) Fr. 1831, accepted as Psora decipiens (Hedw.) Hoffm., (1794)
- Biatora melampepla (Tuck.) Tuck. 1888
- Biatora triptophylla corallinoides Floerke [sic] possibly Biatora thriptophylla var. corallinoides (Hoffm.) Fr., (1845) or Biatora thriptophylla var. coralloides Rabenh. [as Biatora triptophylla var. coralloides], (1845)
- Biatora zeyheri A. Massal. 1861

Genus: Biatorella De Not. 1846,

- Biatorella armstrongiae Zahlbr. [sic], possibly (T.A. Jones) Stizenb. 1927
- Biatorella austroafricana Zahlbr. 1926
- Biatorella clavulus (Stizenb.) Zahlbr. 1927
- Biatorella lugens (Stizenb.) Zahlbr. 1927
- Biatorella palmeti (Stizenb.) Zahlbr. 1927
- Biatorella robiginans (Stizenb.) Zahlbr. 1927

Genus: Bispora Corda 1837

- Bispora effusa Peck 1891

== Bl ==
Genus: Blastenia A. Massal. 1852

- Blastenia acaciae (Vain.) Zahlbr. 1932
- Blastenia aspicilioidea Zahlbr. 1936, accepted as Huea aspicilioidea (Zahlbr.) C.W. Dodge, (1971)
- Blastenia brunnthaleri Zahlbr. 1932
- Blastenia capensis Trevis.*
- Blastenia confluens Müll. Arg. 1888 accepted as Huea confluens (Müll. Arg.) C.W. Dodge, (1971)
- Blastenia ferruginea (Huds.) A. Massal. 1852
- Blastenia imponens (Stizenb.) Zahlbr. 1930
- Blastenia laingsbergensis Zahlbr.*
- Blastenia leptospora Zahlbr. 1926, accepted as Huea leptospora (Zahlbr.) C.W. Dodge, (1971)
- Blastenia ochracea var. parvula (Stizenb.) Zahlbr. 1930
- Blastenia poliotera (Nyl.) Müll. Arg. 1880
- Blastenia praemicans (Nyl.) Zahlbr. 1930
- Blastenia psorothecioides (Vain.) Zahlbr. 1932
- Blastenia punicae (Vain.) Zahlbr. 1932, accepted as Huea punicae (Vain.) C.W. Dodge, (1971)
- Blastenia punicea Müll.Arg.*
- Blastenia sedutrix (Stizenb.) Zahlbr. 1930. [as seductric] accepted as Huea sedutrix (Stizenb.) C.W. Dodge, (1971)
- Blastenia subsalicina Zahlbr. 1932
- Blastenia testaceorufa (Vain.) Zahlbr. 1930
- Blastenia vasquesia A. Massal. 1861

Family: Blastocladiaceae H.E. Petersen 1909

== Bo ==
Genus: Bolbitius Fr. 1838

- Bolbitius boltonii (Pers.) Fr. 1838 accepted as Bolbitius titubans (Bull.) Fr., (1838)
- Bolbitius bulbillosus (Fr.) Gillet 1876
- Bolbitius fragilis (L.) Fr. 1838, accepted as Bolbitius titubans (Bull.) Fr., (1838)
- Bolbitius liberatus Kalchbr. 1879, accepted as Agrocybe liberata (Kalchbr.) E.F. Malysheva,(2019)
- Bolbitius macowani Kalchbr.*
- Bolbitius mitriformis Berk., (1844) [as mitraeformis] accepted as Galeropsis mitriformis (Berk.) R. Heim [as 'mitraeformis'], (1950)

Family: Boletoideae

Genus: Boletus L. 1753

- Boletus bovinus L. 1753 accepted as Suillus bovinus (L.) Roussel (1806))
- Boletus collinitus Fr. 1838 accepted as Suillus collinitus (Fr.) Kuntze, (1898)
- Boletus cutipes Mass.*
- Boletus edulis Bull. 1782
- Boletus elegans Fr. [sic] possibly B. elegans Bull. 1782, accepted as Cerioporus varius (Pers.) Zmitr. & Kovalenko, (2016), B. elegans Bolton 1788, accepted as Grifola frondosa (Dicks.) Gray, (1821), or B. elegans Schumach. 1803, accepted as Suillus grevillei (Klotzsch) Singer,(1945)
- Boletus eximius Peck (1887) accepted as Sutorius eximius (Peck) Halling, Nuhn, & Osmundson (2012)
- Boletus flavidus Fr. 1815, accepted as Suillus flavidus (Fr.) J. Presl, (1846)
- Boletus granulatus L. 1753, accepted as Suillus granulatus (L.) Roussel, (1796)
- Boletus grevillei Klotzsch 1832 accepted as Suillus grevillei (Klotzsch) Singer,(1945)
- Boletus luteus Linn. (1753), accepted as Suillus luteus (L.) Roussel (1796)
- Boletus sanguineus Linn. (1763), accepted as Pycnoporus sanguineus (L.) Murrill (1904)
- Boletus stellenbossiensis Van der Byl 1925
- Boletus subflammeus Berk. 1876 accepted as Chalciporus subflammeus (Berk.) Klofac & Krisai, (2006)
- Boletus versicolor L. 1753 accepted as Trametes versicolor (L.) Lloyd, (1921)
- Boletus sp.

Genus: Bombyliospora De Not. 1852

- Bombyliospora aureola (Tuck.) Zahlbr. 1930, accepted as Letrouitia aureola (Tuck.) Hafellner & Bellem., (1982)
- Bombyliospora domingensis (Pers.) Zahlbr. 1888 accepted as Letrouitia domingensis (Pers.) Hafellner & Bellem., (1982)
- Bombyliospora domingensis var. colorata Vain. 1921
- Bombyliospora domingensis var. flavidula*
- Bombyliospora domingensis var. flavocrocea (Nyl.) Zahlbr. 1930 accepted as Letrouitia flavocrocea (Nyl.) Hafellner & Bellem., (1982)
- Bombyliospora domingensis var. glaucotropa (Nyl.) Vain. 1921
- Bombyliospora domingensis var. inexplicata (Nyl.) Malme 1923
- Bombyliospora domingensis var. inspersa Steiner [sic] possibly (Nyl.) Malme 1923
- Bombyliospora flavidula (Tuck.) Zahlbr. 1930 accepted as Letrouitia flavidula (Tuck.) Hafellner, (1983)
- Bombyliospora flavocrocea A. Massal. 1860 accepted as Letrouitia flavocrocea (Nyl.) Hafellner & Bellem., (1982)
- Bombyliospora incana A.L. Sm. 1911 accepted as Megalospora tuberculosa (Fée) Sipman, (1983)
- Bombyliospora leprolyta (Nyl.) Zahlbr. 1930, accepted as Letrouitia leprolyta (Nyl.) Hafellner, (1983)
- Bombyliospora tuberculosa (Fée) A. Massal. 1852 accepted as Megalospora tuberculosa (Fée) Sipman, (1983)
- Bombyliospora tuberculosa f. geotropa (Stizenb.) Zahlbr. 1930
- Bombyliospora zuluensis Vain. 1926

Genus: Borrera Ach. 1809

- Borrera capensis (L. f.) Ach. 1810
- Borrera chrysophthalma (L.) Ach. 1810 accepted as Teloschistes chrysophthalmus (L.) Th. Fr., (1861)
- Borrera flavicans (Sw.) Ach. 1810 accepted as Teloschistes flavicans (Sw.) Norman, (1852)
- Borrera leucomelos (L.) Ach. [as 'leucomela'], (1810) accepted as Leucodermia leucomelos (L.) Kalb, 2015
- Borrera pubera Ach. 1810
- Borrera pubera var. capensis (L. f.) Ach. 1814

Genus: Botryodiplodia Sacc. 1884

- Botryodiplodia oncidii (Henn.) Petr. & Syd., (1926) accepted as Sphaeropsis oncidii (Henn.) Died., (1914)
- Botryodiplodia palmarum (Cooke) Petr. & Syd. 1927
- Botryodiplodia theobromae Pat. 1892accepted as Lasiodiplodia theobromae (Pat.) Griffon & Maubl. (1909)

Genus: Botryosphaeria Ces. & De Not. 1863

- Botryosphaeria mali V.A. Putterill 1919, accepted as Neofusicoccum ribis (Slippers, Crous & M.J. Wingf.) Crous, Slippers & A.J.L. Phillips, (2006)
- Botryosphaeria ribis Shear, Stev. & Wilcox [sic] possibly Grossenb. & Duggar 1911, accepted as Neofusicoccum ribis (Slippers, Crous & M.J. Wingf.) Crous, Slippers & A.J.L. Phillips, (2006)
- Botryosphaeria ribis var chromogena Shear, N.E. Stevens & Wilcox 1924 accepted as Neofusicoccum ribis (Slippers, Crous & M.J. Wingf.) Crous, Slippers & A.J.L. Phillips, (2006)
- Botryosphaeria vitis (Schulzer) Sacc. 1882 accepted as Echusias vitis (Schulzer) Hazsl., (1873)

Genus: Botrytis

- Botrytis allii Munn 1917
- Botrytis cinerea Pers. 1801
- Botrytis fabae Sardiña 1929
- Botrytis sp.

Genus: Bottaria A. Massal. 1856

- Bottaria pyrenuloides (Mont.) Trevis. 1861accepted as Pyrenula pyrenuloides (Mont.) R.C. Harris,(1989)
- Bottaria thelomorpha (Tuck.) Vain., [as thelemorpha],(1901)
- Bottaria thwaitesii (Leight.) Vain. ex Van der Byl 1931 accepted as Anthracothecium thwaitesii (Leight.) Müll. Arg., (1880)

Genus: Bovista Pers. 1794

- Bovista castanea Lév. 1846 accepted as Disciseda castanea (Lév.) Bottomley, (1948)
- Bovista cervina Berk. 1842 accepted as Disciseda cervina (Berk.) Hollós, (1902)
- Bovista citrina (Berk. & Broome) Bottomley 1948,
- Bovista juglandiformis Berk. ex Massee 1888 accepted as Disciseda juglandiformis (Berk. ex Massee) Hollós, (1902)
- Bovista lilacina Mont. & Berk. 1845 accepted as Calvatia lilacina (Mont. & Berk.) Henn., (1904)
- Bovista oblongispora (Lloyd) Bottomley 1948
- Bovista pusilla de Toni [sic] possibly (Batsch) Pers. 1801
- Bovista umbrina Bottomley 1948
- Bovista zeyheri Berk. ex Massee 1888

Genus: Bovistella Morgan 1892, accepted as Lycoperdon Pers., (1794)

- Bovistella aspera (Lév.) Lloyd 1905 accepted as Lycoperdon asperum (Lév.) Speg., (1881)
- Bovistella oblongispora Lloyd 1917 accepted as Bovista oblongispora (Lloyd) Bottomley, (1948)

Genus: Bovistoides Lloyd 1919, accepted as Myriostoma Desv., (1809)

- Bovistoides simplex Lloyd 1919

== Br ==
Genus: Brachysporium Sacc. 1886

- Brachysporium faureae Henn. 1903 accepted as Annellophorella faureae (Henn.) M.B. Ellis, (1963)
- Brachysporium pulviniforme Syd. & P. Syd. 1914 accepted as Stigmina pulviniformis (Syd. & P. Syd.) S. Hughes, (1952)

Genus: Brigantiaea Trevis. 1853 (Lichens)

- Brigantiaea mariae Trevis. 1853

Genus: Broomeia Berk. 1844

- Broomeia congregata Berk. 1844
- Broomeia ellipsospora Höhn. 1905

== Bu ==
Family: Buelliaceae Zahlbr. 1908

Genus: Buellia De Not. 1846 (Lichens and lichenocolous)

- Buellia abstracta (Nyl.) H. Olivier 1903 accepted as Buellia sequax (Nyl.) Zahlbr., (1931)
- Buellia aethalea (Ach.) Th. Fr. 1874,
- Buellia aethaloessa (Stizenb.) Zahlbr. 1931
- Buellia afra (Stizenb.) Vain. 1901
- Buellia africana Müll. Arg. 1879
- Buellia africana (Tuck.) Tuck. 1866
- Buellia albinea Müll. Arg. 1882
- Buellia albula (Nyl.) Müll. Arg. 1894
- Buellia ambuta (Stizenb.) Zahlbr., (1931) [as ambusta]
- Buellia anatolodia A. Massal. 1861
- Buellia angulosa J. Steiner 1926
- Buellia antarctica A. Massal. 1861
- Buellia antarctica var. effusa A. Massal. 1861
- Buellia antarctica var. insularis A. Massal. 1861
- Buellia brugierae Vain. 1926 accepted as Amandinea brugierae (Vain.) Marbach, (2000)
- Buellia brunnthaleri Zahlbr. 1931
- Buellia callaina (Stizenb.) Zahlbr. 1931
- Buellia callispora var. tetrapla (Nyl.) J. Steiner 1907 accepted as Buellia tetrapla (Nyl.) Müll. Arg., (1888)
- Buellia callisporoides Vain. ex Lynge 1937
- Buellia cangoensis Vain. 1926
- Buellia catalipa A. Massal. 1861
- Buellia coeruleata Zahlbr. 1931
- Buellia contingens (Nyl.) Zahlbr. 1931
- Buellia dialytella Vain. 1926
- Buellia diorista (Nyl.) Zahlbr. 1931, accepted as Amandinea diorista (Nyl.) Marbach, (2000)
- Buellia disciformis (Fr.) Mudd 1861
- Buellia disciformis f. vulgata H. Olivier 1884
- Buellia disciformis var. cinereopruinosa Vain. ex Van der Byl 1931
- Buellia disciformis var. lecanactina J. Steiner 1907
- Buellia disciformis var. sanguinea (Müll. Arg.) Zahlbr. 1931
- Buellia discolorans Zahlbr. 1931
- Buellia dispersa A. Massal. 1856
- Buellia distrahens Vain. 1926
- Buellia distrata (Nyl.) Zahlbr. 1931
- Buellia durbana Vain. 1926
- Buellia endorhodina Vain. ex Lynge 1937
- Buellia epichlora (Vain.) Zahlbr. 1932
- Buellia glencairnensis Zahlbr. 1936
- Buellia halonia (Ach.) Tuck. 1866
- Buellia incrustans J. Steiner 1926, accepted as Amandinea incrustans (J. Steiner) Marbach, (2000)
- Buellia incuriosa (Nyl.) Zahlbr. 1931
- Buellia indissimilis (Nyl.) B. de Lesd. 1914
- Buellia inquilina Tuck. 1866, accepted as Sclerococcum inquilinum (Tuck.) Ertz & Diederich, (2018)
- Buellia insidians (Nyl.) Zahlbr. 1931
- Buellia italica A. Massal. 1856
- Buellia italica var. debanensis Bagl. 1875
- Buellia italica var. recobarina A. Massal. 1856
- Buellia langbaanensis Vain. 1926
- Buellia lauri-cassiae (Fée) Müll. Arg. 1887,
- Buellia lauri-cassiae var. macrosperma Zahlbr. 1932
- Buellia leucina Müll. Arg. 1888
- Buellia lutata (Stizenb.) Zahlbr. 1931
- Buellia meizocarpa Vain. 1926
- Buellia melanthina (Stizenb.) Zahlbr. 1931
- Buellia micromera Vain. 1926 accepted as Baculifera micromera (Vain.) Marbach, (2000)
- Buellia microsperma Müll. Arg. 1886
- Buellia minutula (Körb.) Arnold 1870
- Buellia myriocarpa (DC.) De Not. 1846 accepted as Amandinea punctata (Hoffm.) Coppins & Scheid., (1993)
- Buellia myriocarpella (Nyl.) H. Olivier 1903
- Buellia natalensis Vain. 1926, accepted as Amandinea natalensis (Vain.) Marbach, (2000)
- Buellia nesiotis (Stizenb.) Zahlbr. 1931
- Buellia ocoteae Vain. 1926
- Buellia ocellata (Flörke ex Flot.) Körb., (1855) recorded as Buellia verruculosa (Sm.) Mudd 1861,
- Buellia oleicola (Nyl.) Zahlbr. 1931 accepted as Amandinea oleicola (Nyl.) Giralt & van den Boom, (2012)
- Buellia olivacea Müll. Arg. 1893
- Buellia pachnodes (Stizenb.) Zahlbr. 1931
- Buellia pachysporoides Vain. 1931
- Buellia parasema var. disciformis Th.Fr. [sic] probably (Fr.) Arnold 1858, accepted as Buellia disciformis (Fr.) Mudd, (1861)
- Buellia parasema var. sanguinea Müll. Arg. 1888
- Buellia parasema var. vulgata Th. Fr. 1874 accepted as Buellia disciformis (Fr.) Mudd, (1861)
- Buellia perigrapta (Stizenb.) Zahlbr. 1931
- Buellia permodica (Stizenb.) Zahlbr. 1931
- Buellia perspersa J. Steiner 1926
- Buellia praelata (Stizenb.) Zahlbr. 1931
- Buellia procellarum A. Massal. 1861
- Buellia procellarum var. continuior J. Steiner 1926
- Buellia procellarum var. repens J. Steiner 1926
- Buellia proserpens var. continuior J. Steiner 1926.
- Buellia proserpens var. repens J. Steiner 1926
- Buellia protothallina (Kremp.) Vain. 1903
- Buellia protothallina var. indissimilis Vain. 1903
- Buellia punctata (Hoffm.) A. Massal. 1852
- Buellia punctata f. marcidula (Nyl.) Zahlbr. 1931
- Buellia punctata f. punctiformis (DC.) Hazsl. 1884
- Buellia punctata var. aequata (Ach.) Zahlbr. 1931
- Buellia punetiformis (DC.) A. Massal. 1852
- Buellia pura Vain. 1926
- Buellia quaterna Zahlbr. 1936
- Buellia rhodesiaca Zahlbr. 1932
- Buellia rinodinea A. Massal. 1861
- Buellia rudis (Stizenb.) Zahlbr. 1931
- Buellia rusticorum (Stizenb.) Zahlbr. 1931
- Buellia schinziana Müll. Arg. 1888
- Buellia sequax (Nyl.) Zahlbr., (1931) recorded as Buellia abstracta (Nyl.) H. Olivier 1903
- Buellia spuria (Schaer.) Anzi 1860,
- Buellia spuria var. ferruginea (Schaer.) Anzi 1860,
- Buellia spuria var. insularis (A. Massal.) Jatta 1900
- Buellia stellulata (Taylor) Mudd 1861,
- Buellia stellulata f. albosparsa (Stizenb.) Zahlbr. 1931
- Buellia stellulata f. hybrida (Stizenb.) Zahlbr. 1931
- Buellia stellulata f. murina (Stizenb.) Zahlbr. 1931
- Buellia stizenbergeri Zahlbr. 1931
- Buellia subalbula (Nyl.) Müll. Arg. 1880
- Buellia subcinerascens (Nyl.) Zahlbr. 1931 accepted as Lecidea subcinerascens Nyl., (1877)
- Buellia subdisciformis Vain. [sic] probably (Leight.) Jatta 1900,
- Buellia subtristis (Nyl.) Zahlbr. 1931
- Buellia tetrapla (Nyl.) Müll. Arg., (1888) recorded as Buellia callispora var. tetrapla (Nyl.) J. Steiner 1907
- Buellia transvaalica (Stizenb.) Zahlbr. 1931
- Buellia triplicans Zahlbr. 1932
- Buellia vernicoma (Tuck.) Tuck. 1866
- Buellia verruculosa (Sm.) Mudd 1861, accepted as Buellia ocellata (Flörke ex Flot.) Körb., (1855)
- Buellia viridiatra (Wulfen) H. Olivier 1901 accepted as Rhizocarpon viridiatrum (Wulfen) Körb., (1855)

Genus: Bulgariastrum Syd. & P. Syd. 1913 accepted as Dermea Fr., (1825)

- Bulgariastrum africanum Syd. & P. Syd. 1915
- Bulgariastrum bullatum Doidge 1948

Genus: Bulliardella (Sacc.) Paoli 1905 accepted as Actidium Fr., (1815)

- Bulliardella capensis Doidge 1948,

== By ==
Genus: Byliana Dippen. 1930, accepted as Palawaniella Doidge, (1921)

- Byliana halleriae Dippen. 1930 accepted as Palawaniella halleriae (Dippen.) Arx, (1962)

Genus: Byssochlamys Westling 1909

- Byssochlamys lagunculariae (C. Ram) Samson, Houbraken & Frisvad, (2009) recorded as Byssochlamys nivea Westling 1909
- Byssochlamys nivea Westling 1909 accepted as Byssochlamys lagunculariae (C. Ram) Samson, Houbraken & Frisvad, (2009)

Genus: Byssoloma Trevis. 1853

- Byssoloma tricholomum f. confluens Vain. ex Van der Byl 1931

Genus: Byssospora *

- Byssospora stupposa Massal.*

== See also ==
- List of bacteria of South Africa
- List of Oomycetes of South Africa
- List of slime moulds of South Africa
- List of fungi of South Africa
  - List of fungi of South Africa – A
  - List of fungi of South Africa – C
  - List of fungi of South Africa – D
  - List of fungi of South Africa – E
  - List of fungi of South Africa – F
  - List of fungi of South Africa – G
  - List of fungi of South Africa – H
  - List of fungi of South Africa – I
  - List of fungi of South Africa – J
  - List of fungi of South Africa – K
  - List of fungi of South Africa – L
  - List of fungi of South Africa – M
  - List of fungi of South Africa – N
  - List of fungi of South Africa – O
  - List of fungi of South Africa – P
  - List of fungi of South Africa – Q
  - List of fungi of South Africa – R
  - List of fungi of South Africa – S
  - List of fungi of South Africa – T
  - List of fungi of South Africa – U
  - List of fungi of South Africa – V
  - List of fungi of South Africa – W
  - List of fungi of South Africa – X
  - List of fungi of South Africa – Y
  - List of fungi of South Africa – Z
