= Buellia arida =

Scientific classification
- Kingdom: Fungi
- Division: Ascomycota
- Class: Lecanoromycetes
- Order: Caliciales
- Family: Caliciaceae
- Genus: Buellia
- Species: B. arida

Binomial name
- Buellia arida Elix (2020)
- Holotype site: Henbury Station, Northern Territory

Species of lichen

Buellia arida is a species of saxicolous (rock-dwelling), crustose lichen in the family Caliciaceae. It occurs in Australia. Buellia arida grows up to 4 cm wide, either concealed within or visible on rock surfaces, forming small, fragmented patches. It features an off-white, dull thallus, numerous black apothecia that become convex over time, and spores that evolve from pale to dark brown, characterized by their ellipsoid shape and finely decorated surface.

== Taxonomy ==
The type specimen was collected near Rockhole Bore, Chandler Range (Henbury Station, Northern Territory) at an elevation of 434 m (1,424 ft), on a sandstone boulder. This location, near the base of a steep rocky slope in open shrubland, features Acacia, Dodonaea and Eremophila as the dominant plant vegetation. The lichen is named after its occurrence in arid habitats.

== Description ==
Buellia arida grows up to 40 mm (1.6 in) wide, either hidden within rocks or visible on rock surfaces. Its visible form appears as small, broken, skin-like patches around the lichen's fruiting bodies or in rock crevices. The thallus is off-white and dull, with algae cells measuring 8–19 μm wide. The lichen's fruiting bodies, known as apothecia, are numerous, black, and can become convex with age, surrounded by a thin outer layer. The spore-bearing tissue is colourless, while the supporting tissue beneath ranges from brown to deep red-brown. Buellia arida has sparsely branched thread-like structures (paraphyses) in its fertile tissue, with brown-tipped branches, and produces two-part spores that are ellipsoid and change from pale to dark brown, with a finely decorated outer surface. Rarely, the lichen has pycnidia, which have black openings and produce rod-shaped spores. The spores themselves are of the Buellia type, divided into two parts by a single septum, change from pale brown to dark brown as they mature, and are ellipsoid in shape, measuring 11–17 by 5–7 μm.

Buellia arida is similar to Buellia abstracta, but is distinguished by larger ascospores and longer conidia.

== Habitat and distribution ==
The species is found in far-western New South Wales and southern parts of the Northern Territory. Commonly associated lichens include Buellia dispersa, B. spuria var. amblyogona, Filsoniana australiensis, Sarcogyne iridana, and Xanthoparmelia cravenii.
