= Buellia cravenii =

Scientific classification
- Kingdom: Fungi
- Division: Ascomycota
- Class: Lecanoromycetes
- Order: Caliciales
- Family: Caliciaceae
- Genus: Buellia
- Species: B. cravenii

Binomial name
- Buellia cravenii Elix (2020)
- Holotype site: MacDonnell Ranges, Northern Territory

Species of lichen

Buellia cravenii is a species of saxicolous (rock-dwelling), crustose lichen in the family Caliciaceae. It is found in Australia. The lichen spreads up to 3.5 cm wide thick, forming a continuous, grey-white cracked pattern of areoles.

== Taxonomy ==
The lichen was formally described in 2020 by the Australian lichenologist John Elix. The type specimen was collected near Glen Helen Tourist Camp (MacDonnell Ranges, Northern Territory), at an elevation of 640 m (2,100 ft), where it was found growing on sandstone rocks with a southerly aspect in mulga scrub. The species epithet cravenii is named in honour of the late Lyndley Craven, a co-collector, friend, and colleague of the author.

== Description ==
Buellia cravenii is a crustose lichen with a thallus spreading up to 35 mm wide and 0.6 mm thick, forming a continuous, cracked pattern of irregular, angular segments (areoles). Its surface is grey-white, dull, and lacks a powdery covering (pruina), with the symbiotic algae cells within the thallus measuring 8–20 μm wide. The inner layer of the thallus is white, does not contain calcium oxalate, and the reproductive structures (apothecia) are numerous, small, roundish, and vary from flat to convex. The outer layer surrounding the apothecia is thick and black, becoming less noticeable in older structures. The layer above the spore-producing tissue (epihymenium) is deep blue-green to black, while the supporting tissue below (hypothecium) is dark brown and thick. The actual spore-producing layer (hymenium) is clear, and the layer above it (epithecium) is pale brown.

In the hymenium, the slender, thread-like structures (paraphyses) branch out sparingly, with blue-green caps. The spore-producing sacs (asci) contain eight spores each, transitioning from the Physconia type to the Buellia type as they mature. These spores are two-part, start pale and turn dark brown, ellipsoid in shape, measuring 12–19 by 5–9 μm with a finely decorated outer surface. Additionally, Buellia cravenii has brown, dot-like reproductive structures (pycnidia) embedded in the thallus, producing rod-shaped spores measuring 5–7 by 0.8–1 μm. The medulla of the lichen contains psoromic acid and atranorin.

Buellia cravenii is similar to Buellia psoromica but has distinct features such as a non-amyloid medulla, oil-containing paraphyses in the hymenium, longer ascospores, and shorter conidia.

== Habitat and distribution ==
Buellia cravenii is found on siliceous rocks in arid inland areas of South Australia, the Northern Territory, and Western Australia. It often coexists with other lichens such as Buellia dispersa, B. spuria var. amblyogona, Filsoniana australiensis, Sarcogyne iridana, and Xanthoparmelia cravenii.
