= Buellia kowenensis =

Scientific classification
- Kingdom: Fungi
- Division: Ascomycota
- Class: Lecanoromycetes
- Order: Caliciales
- Family: Caliciaceae
- Genus: Buellia
- Species: B. kowenensis

Binomial name
- Buellia kowenensis Elix & P.M.McCarthy (2020)
- Holotype site: Kowen, Queensland

Species of lichen

Buellia kowenensis is a rare species of saxicolous (rock-dwelling), crustose lichen in the family Caliciaceae. It is only known to occur at its original collection site in the Australian Capital Territory of Australia.

== Taxonomy ==
Buellia kowenensis was formally described as a new species in 2020 by the lichenologists John Elix and Patrick M. McCarthy. The type specimen of the species was collected in Australia, within the Australian Capital Territory. Specifically, it was found along Kowen Road in Kowen Forest, located about 11.7 kilometres (7.3 mi) east of Canberra. This specimen was collected at an altitude of 700 m (2,300 ft), situated on sandstone rocks beside an old road that runs adjacent to an open Eucalyptus woodland. Buellia kowenensis is named after its type locality, Kowen Forest in the Australian Capital Territory.

== Description ==
The thallus of Buellia kowenensis is crustose, rimose-areolate, and can grow up to 10 mm wide and 0.3 mm thick. The areoles, or cracked segments, range from 0.1 to 0.7 mm wide. The upper surface is white to off-white, dull, and appears crystalline or spotted due to the incorporation of silica. It does not form soredia and lacks a distinct bordering prothallus. The photobiont cells are 8–14 μm wide. The medulla is white, contains calcium oxalate (as indicated by a positive sulphuric acid reaction), and does not change colour when stained with iodine.

The apothecia, or fruiting bodies, are 0.1–0.4 mm wide, lecideine in type, and can be separate, broadly attached, with a black, non-powdery, and either weakly concave or convex disc. The proper exciple, the rim around the disc, is thin, initially raised above the disc, but becomes thinner and level with the disc in older apothecia. The outer part of the exciple is dark brown, measuring 15–25 μm thick, and the hypothecium beneath the spore-producing tissue is deep red-brown, 50–60 μm thick. The epihymenium is dark brown and 10–12 μm thick. The hymenium is 50–60 μm thick, colourless, and the subhymenium beneath it is pale brown, 10–15 μm thick. The paraphyses are 1.5–2 μm wide, sparsely branched, with brown-capped tips. The asci are of the Bacidia type and contain eight spores. The ascospores are of the Buellia type, 1-septate, brown, ellipsoid, measuring 9–13 by 5–7 μm, and older spores are constricted at the septum; the outer spore-wall is microrugulate. Pycnidia are punctiform, immersed, with a brown ostiole. The conidia are bacilliform, measuring 8–10 by 1 μm. The medulla contains isoarthothelin as a major component and 4,5-dichloronorlichexanthone in trace amounts.

Buellia kowenensis resembles Buellia halonia but is distinct due to its smaller, persistently Buellia-type ascospores and the presence of medullary calcium oxalate.

== Habitat and distribution ==
At the time of its original publication, Buellia kowenensis was known only from its type collection in Kowen Forest, Australian Capital Territory. It was found on sandstone rocks in an open Eucalyptus woodland. Associated lichens in this habitat include Buellia spuria var. amblyogona, B. amandineaiformis, B. suttonensis, Lecidea sarcogynoides, L. terrena, Trapelia concentrica, and a species of Xanthoparmelia.
