= Aegerita =

Aegerita may refer to:

- Aegerita, genus of fungi including Aegerita penniseti, a.k.a. Beniowskia sphaeroidea
- Agrocybe aegerita, a species of mushroom in genus Agrocybe

== See also ==
- Aegirine, mineral
- Aegeria, a.k.a. nymph Egeria (mythology)
