= Baculifera =

Scientific classification
- Kingdom: Fungi
- Division: Ascomycota
- Class: Lecanoromycetes
- Order: Caliciales
- Family: Caliciaceae
- Genus: Baculifera; Marbach & Kalb (2000)

Type species
- Baculifera orosa Marbach (2000)

Genus of lichens in the family Caliciaceae

Baculifera is a genus of lichens in the family Caliciaceae. It was circumscribed in 2000 by Bernhard Marbach and Klaus Kalb. Species in this genus are characterized by having bacilliform conidia typically measuring 8–11 μm long, and a non-inspersed hymenium. The genus is roughly similar in morphology to Buellia.

== Description ==
The thallus is crustose: it forms a thin, appressed crust that can be smooth and continuous or break into patches, and in some species it lies mostly within the bark (endophloeodal). It lacks a distinct outer cortex (ecorticate), and a faint marginal prothallus may be present. The photobiont is a unicellular green alga with roughly spherical cells about 8–18 μm across.

Sexual reproductive structures are apothecia that are lecideine (with only a proper margin, not a thalline one) and sessile. The disc is black and flat, wavy, or slightly convex, without a whitish frosting (epruinose). The proper exciple is persistent, the same colour as the disc, and cup-shaped in section, appearing opaque dark brown. The hymenium is clear and not filled with oil droplets (hyaline, not inspersed) and carries a dark, pigmented epithecial layer. Paraphyses are simple or only sparsely branched and tend to stick together in a KOH test; their tips bear a distinct, internally pigmented cap. The asci are club-shaped and usually contain 3–8 spores. Their apical cap (tholus) is well developed and amyloid (staining blue with iodine), sometimes with a slightly more intensely amyloid band beside a broad or narrow conical central plug (a masse axiale) whose rounded apex usually extends through the tholus.

The ascospores are brown to grey-brown, ellipsoid, sometimes slightly curved, and divided by 1–3 cross-walls. They lack a clear outer halo, and occur in two main forms: a Buellia-type with fairly even walls and little thickening, and a Callispora-type with slight to strong wall thickenings near the ends and the middle. Asexual reproduction occurs in immersed pycnidia that produce short, rod-shaped conidia (bacilliform). In chemical tests, many species contain atranorin and/or norstictic acid, while others have no detectable secondary metabolites.

== Species ==
- Baculifera cinereocincta (Müll.Arg.) Marbach (2000)
- Baculifera confusa Elix (2020)
- Baculifera curtisii (Tuck.) Marbach (2000)
- Baculifera entochlora (J.Steiner) Marbach (2000)
- Baculifera epifuscescens Elix & Kantvilas (2014)
- Baculifera epiviolascens Marbach (2000)
- Baculifera imshaugiana (R.C.Harris) Marbach (2000)
- Baculifera intermedia Marbach (2000)
- Baculifera intermedioides Marbach (2000)
- Baculifera longispora Marbach (2000)
- Baculifera macromera Elix & Kantvilas (2014)
- Baculifera metaphragmia (C.Knight) Elix & Kantvilas (2014)
- Baculifera metaphragmioides Elix & Kantvilas (2014)
- Baculifera micromera (Vain.) Marbach (2000)
- Baculifera orosa Marbach (2000)
- Baculifera pseudomicromera Marbach (2000)
- Baculifera remensa (Stirt.) Marbach (2000)
- Baculifera tobleri (Zahlbr.) Marbach (2000)
- Baculifera xylophila (Malme) Marbach (2000)
