= Buellia stellulata =

Scientific classification
- Kingdom: Fungi
- Division: Ascomycota
- Class: Lecanoromycetes
- Order: Caliciales
- Family: Caliciaceae
- Genus: Buellia
- Species: B. stellulata

Binomial name
- Buellia stellulata (Taylor) Mudd

Species of fungus

Buellia stellulata, commonly known as the disc lichen) is a species of crustose lichen that is widely distributed throughout the Northern Hemisphere.

== Morphology ==
=== Thallus ===
The thallus is crustose, areolate, and thin to moderately thickened, often forming a continuous layer. The prothallus is conspicuous and black, strongly developed in most specimens, growing between the areoles to form a hypothallus. The thallus surface is usually white to whitish gray, rarely dark gray, and can be dull or slightly shiny. The thallus is epruinose and phenocorticate, and lacks soredia.

=== Medulla ===
The medulla is white and lacks calcium oxalate.

=== Apothecia ===
The apothecia exhibit a lecideine structure, with a diameter ranging from (0.2-)0.3-0.4(-0.5) mm. They are typically immersed to adnate, occasionally found in a sessile form. The margin may appear black or masked by grayish remnants of necrotic thalline material, forming a thin and usually persistent boundary, occasionally excluded as they mature. The disc is characterized by a black, epruinose surface, typically flat but occasionally developing a slight convexity over time. Within the apothecia, the proper exciple appears narrow and lacks differentiation, resembling the aethalea-type. The inner excipular hyphae are narrow, hyaline, and often prosoplectenchymatous, exhibiting structural and orientational similarities to the paraphyses. The hypothecium is characterized by a deep reddish-brown color, described as leptoclinos-brown with a textura intricata. Outer excipular hyphae are arranged parallelly, moderately swollen (textura oblita), and heavily carbonized, displaying a range of brown shades and aeruginose pigments.

=== Epihymenium ===
The epihymenium is brown, with pigmentation continuous with the outer exciple.

=== Hymenium ===
The hymenium is hyaline and not inspersed with oil droplets. The paraphyses are simple to moderately branched, with apically swollen tips containing a brown pigment cap.

=== Asci and ascospores ===
The asci are clavate, Bacidia-type, and 8-spored. The ascospores soon become brown, 1-septate, oblong to ellipsoid, usually not constricted, with obtuse ends, and not curved, measuring (8-)8.7-[9.9]-11.1(-13) x (4.5-)4.8-[5.5]-6.1(-7) μm. The proper septum is narrow and does not thicken during spore ontogeny (Buellia-type). The spore ornamentation is microrugulate.

== Chemistry ==
The lichen contains the secondary metabolites atranorin, 2'-O-methylperlatolic acid, (Note: Buellia stellulata is very similar to Buellia spuria, but differs in containing 2'-O-methylperlatolic acid rather than stictic or norstictic acid, and having an I− medulla. Specimens reported from inland localities as B. stellulata actually belong to B. spuria.) and confluentic acid. Spot tests are K+ yellow (sometimes weak), P− or + faintly yellow, C−, KC−, and CK−. UV fluorescence is − (dark).

== Substrate and ecology ==
Buellia stellulata, an epilithic lichen, thrives on siliceous rock surfaces (typically HCl−) and is commonly found in coastal regions. However, its habitat is not restricted solely to seashore environments.

== Distribution ==
Buellia stellulata exhibits a broad distribution across the Northern Hemisphere. Within the Sonoran region, this species is notably present in coastal areas spanning from southern California to Baja California and Baja California Sur.

== See also ==
- List of Buellia species
