= Colonche =

Alcoholic red coloured drink

- Type: Alcoholic drink
- Origin: Mexico, Aguascalientes, San Luis Potosi and Zacatecas
- Colour: Red
- Flavour: Spicy
- Ingredients: Fruits of "nopal"

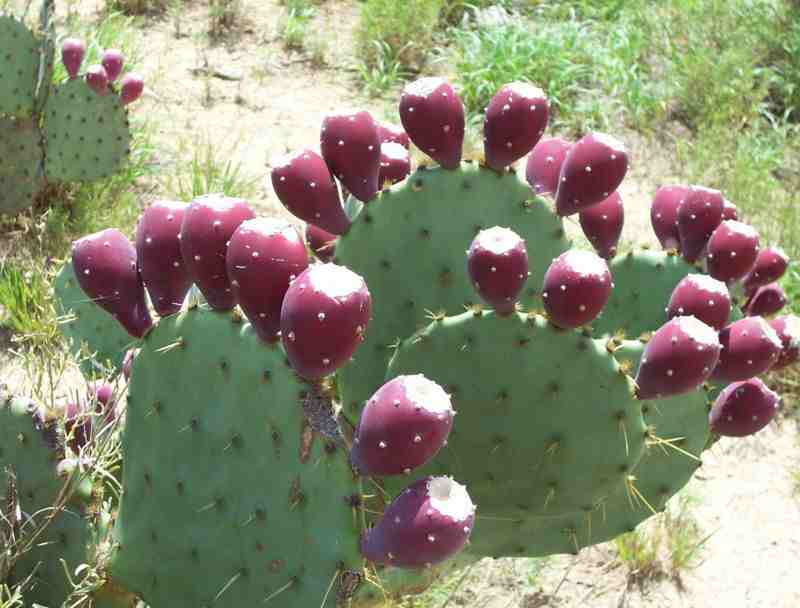

Colonche is an alcoholic red coloured drink from Mexico prepared with tuna, the fruits of "nopal" (Opuntia cacti), especially with tuna cardona, the fruits of Opuntia streptacantha.

It is prepared in the states where wild nopal is abundant (Aguascalientes, San Luis Potosi and Zacatecas).

It is a sweet, fizzy beverage. For preparation, the cactus fruits are peeled and crushed to obtain the juice, which is boiled for 2–3 hours. After cooling, the juice is allowed to ferment for a few days. Sometimes old colonche is added as a starter. Another possible starter is "tibicos". Tibicos are gelatinous masses of yeasts and bacteria, grown in water with brown sugar.

Amongst other microorganisms responsible for the spontaneous fermentation of colonche, a yeast, Torulopsis taboadae (syn. Torulaspora delbrueckii?), has been isolated.

In 2003, Teófilo Herrera Suárez, a Mexican mycologist, published a book titled Más allá del pulque y el tepache (Beyond Pulque and Tepache), in which he writes about traditional Mexican alcoholic beverages such as "pozol", "tesgüino" and "colonche".

== See also ==
- List of Mexican dishes
