= Buellia subalbula =

Scientific classification
- Kingdom: Fungi
- Division: Ascomycota
- Class: Lecanoromycetes
- Order: Caliciales
- Family: Caliciaceae
- Genus: Buellia
- Species: B. subalbula

Binomial name
- Buellia subalbula (Nyl.) Müll.Arg. (1880)

Synonyms
- Lecidea subalbula Nyl. (1868)

Species of lichen

Buellia subalbula is a species of saxicolous (rock-dwelling), crustose lichen in the family Caliciaceae. It occurs in coastal southern Africa, South America, and Australia, where it grows on calcareous rocks.

== Taxonomy ==
The lichen was first formally described as a new species in 1868 by the Finnish lichenologist William Nylander, based on collections made from coastal Angola. Johannes Müller Argoviensis transferred it to the genus Buellia in 1880.

== Description ==
Buellia subalbula has a crustose thallus, which is thin to thick and often forms distinct circular patches. These patches can merge, creating a larger spread on the substrate, which is typically rock (epilithic). The thallus texture ranges from smooth and continuous in thinner forms to cracked and segmented (rimose-areolate) in thicker ones. The margins of the thallus are bordered by a prothallus, which is noticeably blackened to pale grey, and in some cases, white but less distinct. The surface of the thallus is matte, usually white or occasionally grey, and has a pruinose (frost-like) appearance. It is made of dead cells and calcium oxalate crystals, which contribute to its thick, chalky look.

The apothecia (fruiting bodies) of Buellia subalbula are typically lecideine but can have a thalline collar. These apothecia are initially immersed in the thallus, eventually becoming more prominent (sessile). They are characterised by their black colour, sometimes with a white pruinose disc, and a thin, black proper margin. As the lichen matures, the disc becomes convex. The exciple, the layer surrounding the disc, is composed of narrow hyphae with a unique pigmentation that turns bluish-green under certain conditions.

The hymenium, or the tissue bearing the spore-producing asci, is clear, with simple to moderately branched paraphyses. These paraphyses end in a brown cap and contain a distinctive aeruginose pigment. The asci are clavate (club-shaped) and typically contain eight narrowly oblong to ellipsoid spores. These spores are one-septate (divided into two cells) and develop a smooth surface as they mature. Pycnidia, the asexual reproductive structures, are rare in this species. When present, they are globe-shaped and almost completely filled with densely branched conidiophores. The conidia, or asexual spores, are simple and bacilliform (rod-shaped).

The chemical composition of Buellia subalbula includes norstictic acid, often with traces of connorstictic acid and possibly xanthones. Chemical spot tests on the thallus yield various colour reactions, including yellow to red with a solution of potassium hydroxide (K) and yellow with para-phenylenediamine (P). The thallus medulla does not react to iodine (I–), indicating it is non-amyloid, while the hymenium turns deep blue with iodine, showing an amyloid reaction.

== Habitat and distribution ==
Buellia subalbula has a preference for growing exclusively on calcareous rocks, which are rich in calcium carbonate. Its distribution is limited and primarily concentrated around specific geographic locations. The species was initially identified at its type locality in Angola. Beyond this primary region, there have been only a handful of recorded occurrences: a singular collection was made in Namibia, another in Bolivia in South America, and one specimen has been documented in Western Australia.

== See also ==
- List of Buellia species
