= Buellia concinna =

Scientific classification
- Domain: Eukaryota
- Kingdom: Fungi
- Division: Ascomycota
- Class: Lecanoromycetes
- Order: Caliciales
- Family: Caliciaceae
- Genus: Buellia
- Species: B. concinna

Binomial name
- Buellia concinna Th. Fr.

Species of fungus

Buellia concinna, the cinnabar button lichen, is a pale yellow to greenish or brownish bullate (bubble-like) to granular crustose lichen that prefers siliceous rock and cliff faces in temperate to subarctic, subalpine and alpine climates throughout the Northern Hemisphere. In North America, it prefers higher altitudes such as in the Sierra Nevada range. Lecideine apothecia are sessile on the thallus and are .2–.8 mm (0.0079–0.0315 in) in diameter with black discs. Lichen spot tests are C+ orange or pinkish, K+ yellow, KC− but CK+ orange, and it is UV+ yellow to ultraviolet light. Secondary metabolites include arthothelin, isoarthothelin, 6-O-methylarthothelin, 4, 5-dichloronorlichexanthone, 4, 5-dichloro-6-O-methylnorlichexanthone, asemone, thiophanic acid, gyrophoric acid, lecanoric acid, and orsellinic acid.
