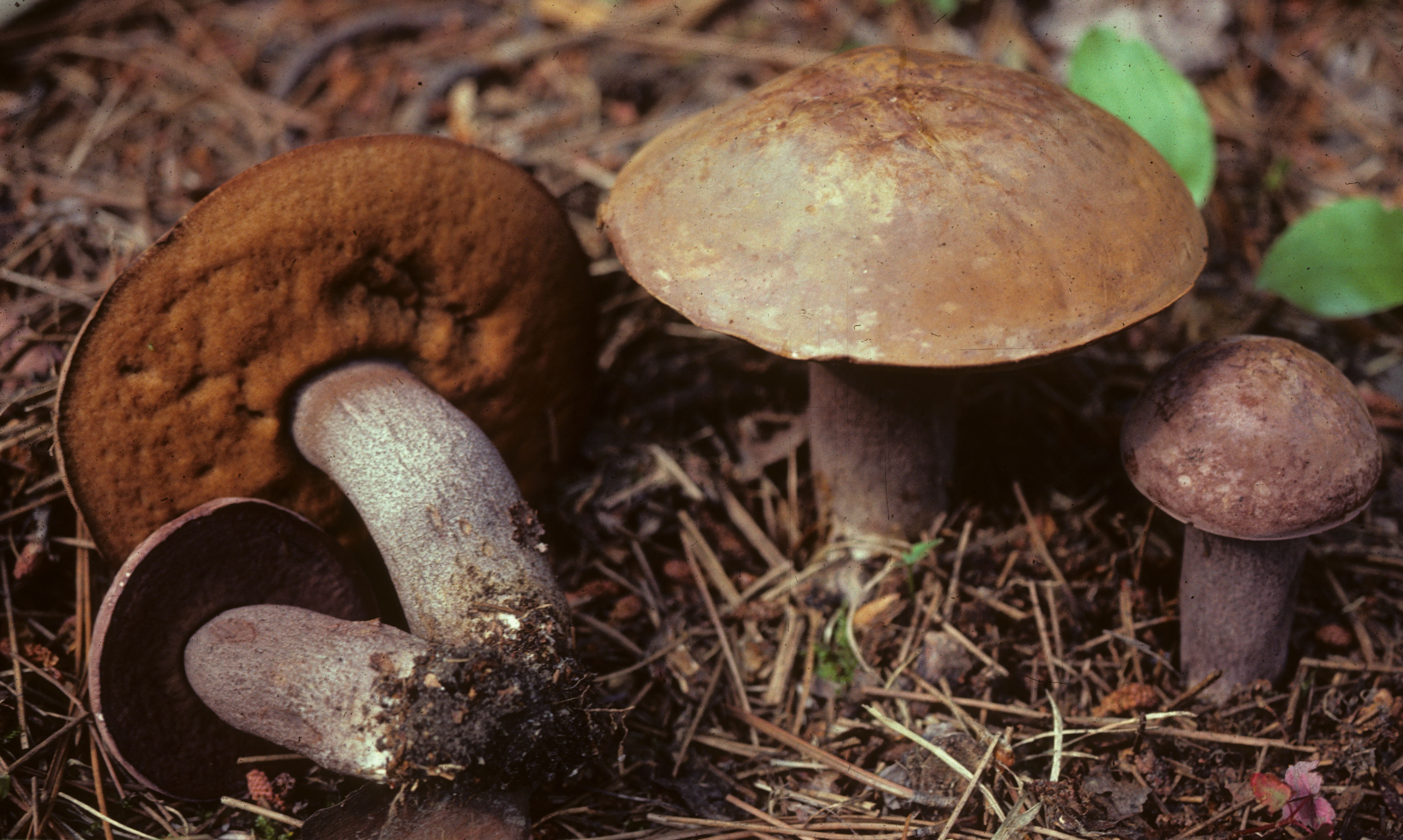
- Sutorius eximius

Scientific classification
- Domain: Eukaryota
- Kingdom: Fungi
- Division: Basidiomycota
- Class: Agaricomycetes
- Order: Boletales
- Family: Boletaceae
- Genus: Sutorius; Halling, Nuhn & Fechner (2012)

Type species
- Sutorius eximius (Peck) Halling, Nuhn, & Osmundson. (2012)

Species
- Sutorius australiensis Sutorius eximius Sutorius magnificus Sutorius subrufus

= Sutorius =

Genus of fungi

Sutorius is a genus of fungi in the family Boletaceae. Its type species is the widely distributed Sutorius eximius (formerly referred to the genera Boletus, Ceriomyces, Leccinum, and Tylopilus). The Asian Boletus obscureumbrinus, found in Japan and China, was described by Japanese mycologist Tsuguo Hongo in 1968, moved to genus Sutorius in 2016, but then reclassified into genus Neoboletus in 2019. The Australian Sutorius australiensis and the southern Chinese Sutorius subrufus also belong to the genus.

The genus name of Sutorius is in honour of Charles Christopher Frost (1805 - 1880), who was an American botanist (Mycology) and also cobbler, sutor(-ius) = Latin for cobble.

The genus was circumscribed by Roy Edward Halling, Mitchell E. Nuhn and Nigel A. Fechner in Mycologia Vol.104 (Issue 4), on page 955 in 2012.
