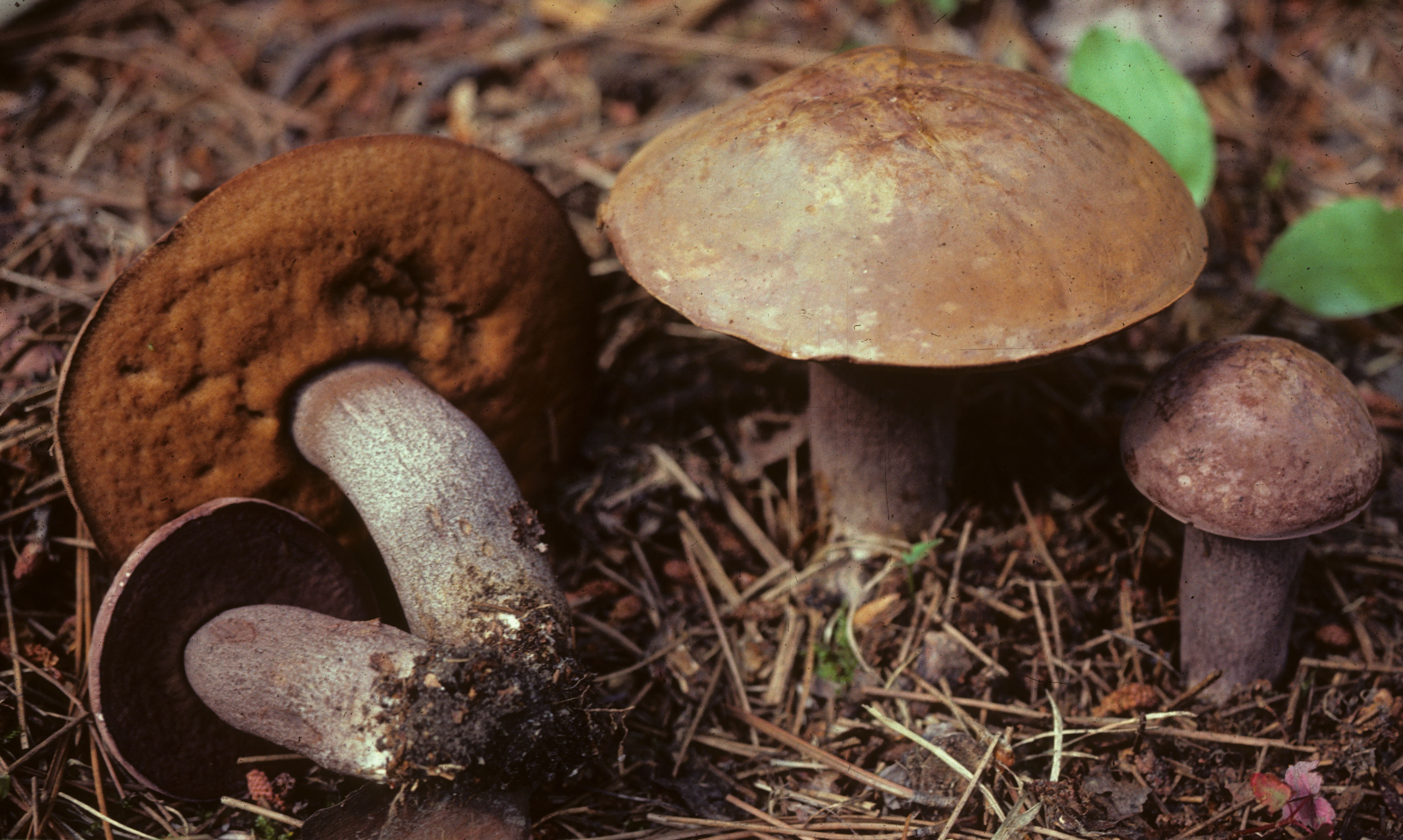

Scientific classification
- Kingdom: Fungi
- Division: Basidiomycota
- Class: Agaricomycetes
- Order: Boletales
- Family: Boletaceae
- Genus: Sutorius
- Species: S. eximius

Binomial name
- Sutorius eximius (Peck) Halling, Nuhn, & Osmundson (2012)

Synonyms
- Boletus robustus Frost (1874); Boletus eximius Peck (1887); Ceriomyces eximius (Peck) Murrill (1909); Tylopilus eximius (Peck) Singer (1947); Leccinum eximium (Peck) Pomerleau (1959); Leccinum eximium (Peck) Singer (1973)

= Sutorius eximius =

Species of fungus

Sutorius eximius, commonly known as the lilac-brown bolete, is a species of fungus in the family Boletaceae. Originally described in 1874 as a species of Boletus, the fungus has also been classified in the genus Leccinum because of the scabers on the stipe, or in Tylopilus because of the color of the spore print. Molecular genetic analysis revealed that the lilac-brown bolete was separate from both of these genera, and merited placement in a new genus. Sutorius was created to contain this bolete and the closely related Australian species S. australiensis.

This bolete produces fruit bodies that are dark purple to chocolate brown in color with a smooth cap, a finely scaly stipe, and a reddish-brown spore print. The tiny pores on the cap underside are chocolate to violet brown. It is widely distributed, having been recorded on North America, South America, and Asia, where it grows in a mycorrhizal relationship with both coniferous and deciduous trees.

== Taxonomy ==
The species was originally described as Boletus robustus by American mycologist Charles Christopher Frost in 1874, from specimens collected in Vermont. He noted that the cap was "chocolate color, fleshy, and so succulent that it is difficult to dry and preserve". The name assigned by Frost, however, is an illegitimate homonym of a name previously used for a different species by Miles Joseph Berkeley in 1851. Charles Horton Peck published the new name Boletus eximius for the same species in 1887. William Alphonso Murrill transferred the species to Ceriomyces in 1909, but this genus is no longer recognized, having largely been subsumed into Boletus.

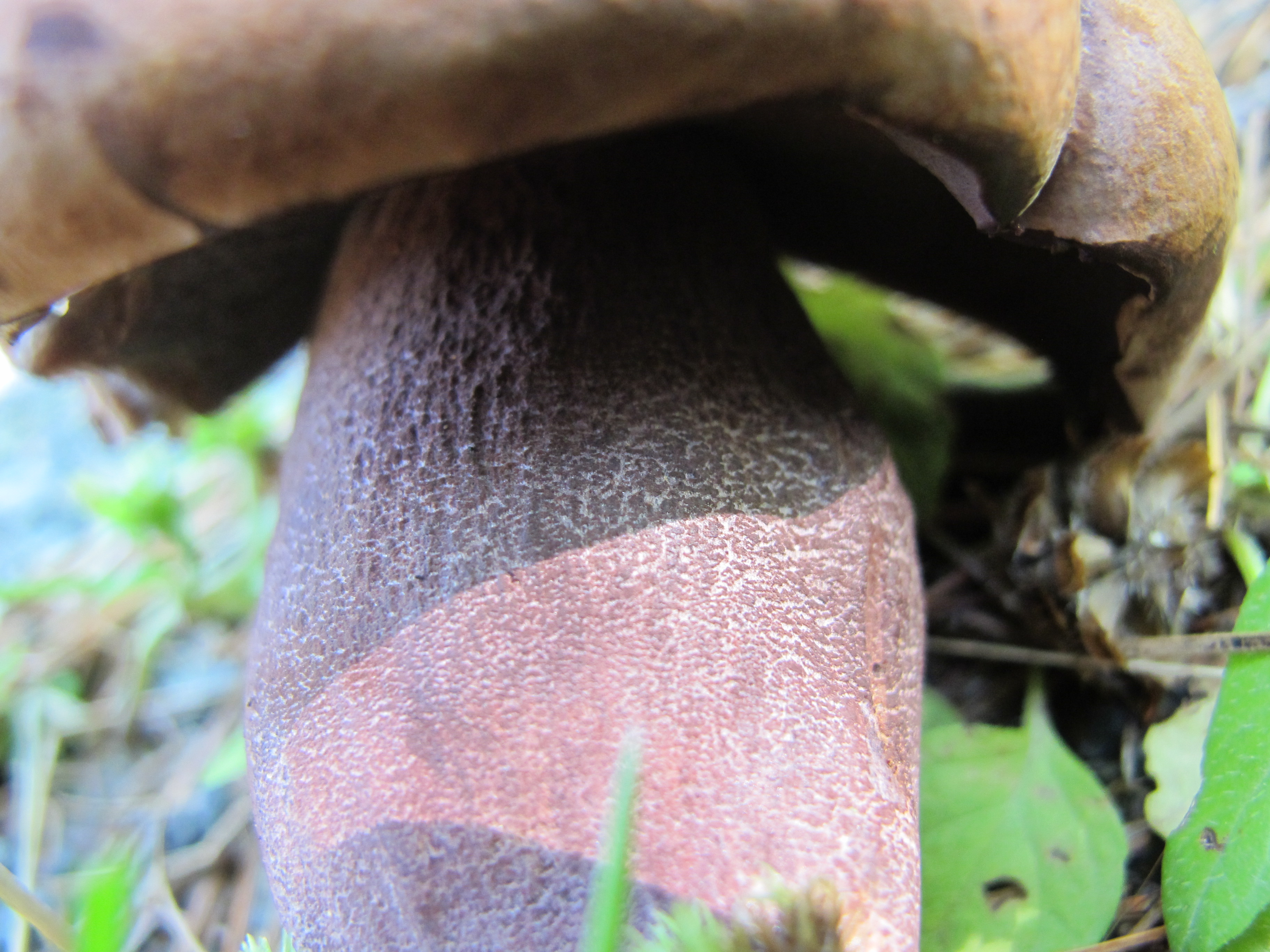
The scales on the stipe surface are distinct from those of Leccinum.

Various authorities have treated the taxon as either a Boletus, Leccinum, or Tylopilus, depending on which morphological characteristics they deemed most significant. Rolf Singer initially considered the species most appropriately placed in Tylopilus on account of the reddish-brown spore print, a taxonomic opinion shared by Alexander H. Smith and Harry Thiers, who wrote "Concerning whether or not the species should be placed in Leccinum, we can only say that the color of the stipe ornamentation is merely a reflection of the color of the stipe generally and that it does not change color in a characteristic pattern as it ages. For this reason we exclude it from Leccinum and agree with Singer that it is a Tylopilus." Later however, Singer thought the somewhat scabrous ornamentation of the stipe justified a placement in Leccinum. René Pomerleau had previously (1959) placed the species in Leccinum, but this transfer was invalid, as no basionym was specified.

Roy E. Halling designated a lectotype specimen in 1983 from Frost's original collections. Early molecular evidence suggested that the lilac-brown bolete was genetically distinct from the genera in which it had formerly been placed. In 2012, Halling and colleagues published molecular evidence indicating that the species did not belong in either Tylopilus or Leccinum as it does not share a recent common ancestor with either of those genera. Recognizing its genetic and morphological distinctiveness, they created the genus Sutorius, with S. eximius as the type species. As of 2015, the only other species in Sutorius is S. australiensis, found in Australia.

The generic name Sutorius is derived for the Latin word for "cobbler" (sutor), referring to Charles Frost's profession. The epithet eximius means "distinguished" or "excellent in size and beauty". Although Frost's reason for using this name is not known with certainty, Peter Roberts and Shelley Evans speculate "Perhaps it was the violet-brown colors, which are quite attractive in a formal, nineteenth-century manner." S. eximius is commonly known as the "lilac-brown bolete".

== Description ==
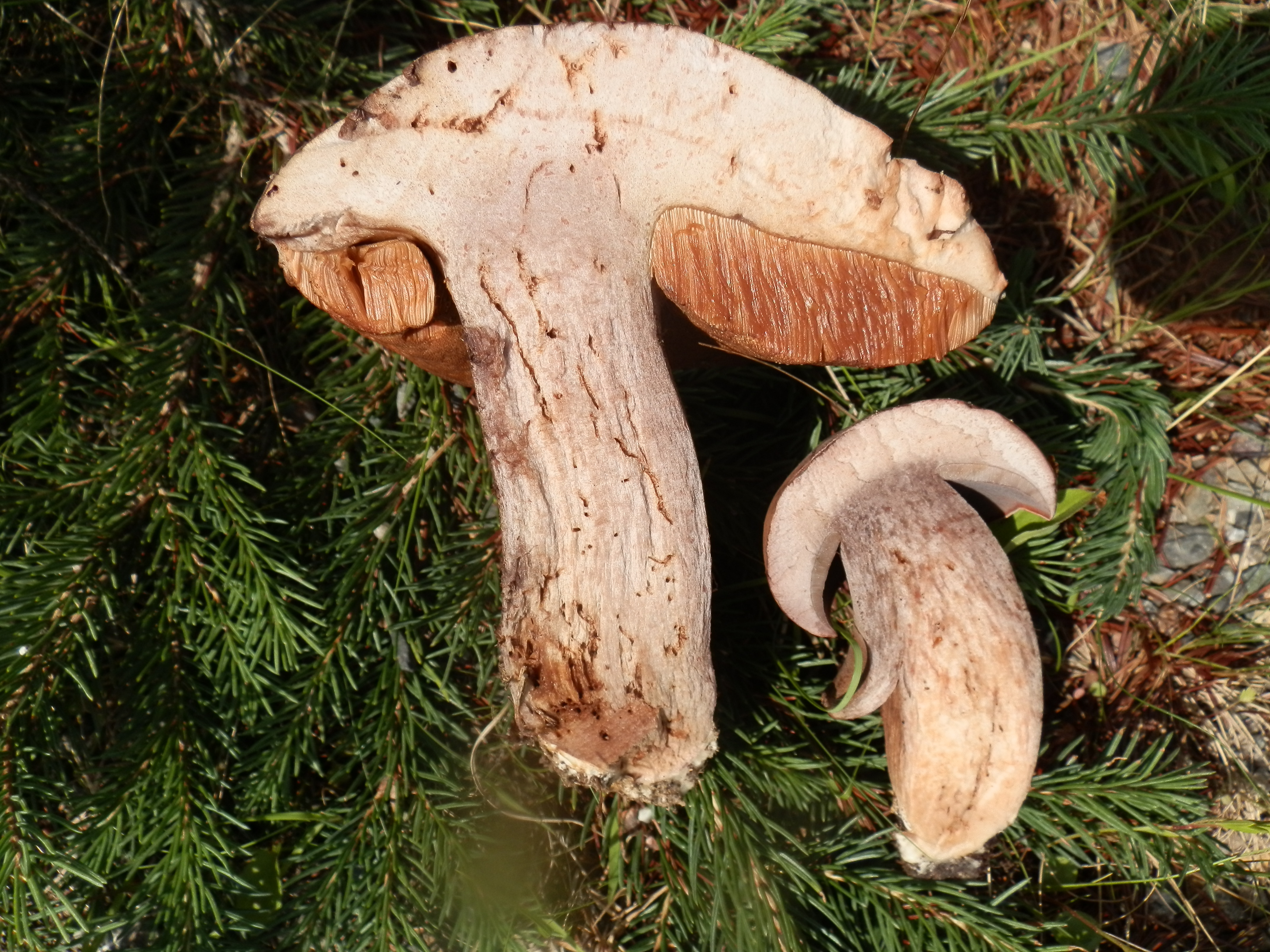
Bisected fruitbody

Fruit bodies have caps that are initially convex, later becoming broadly convex to more or less flat, with a diameter of 5–12 cm (2.0–4.7 in). The cap surface is dry to slightly sticky, with a texture ranging from smooth to somewhat felt-like. Its color is purplish brown to grayish brown to reddish brown; young specimens are often covered with a fine whitish bloom (a delicate, powdery coating). The flesh is whitish, and slowly stains gray-brown when it is cut or injured. It has no distinctive odor, and a mild to slightly bitter taste. On the cap underside, the pore surface is dark chocolate brown to purple brown, and stains dark brown where bruised. The nearly circular pores number up to 3 per millimeter, and the tubes are 0.9–2.2 cm (0.4–0.9 in) deep. The solid stipe measures 4.5–9 cm (1.8–3.5 in) long by 1–4 cm (0.4–1.6 in) thick. Its color is similar to that of the cap, and it has a scurfy surface from a dense coating of purplish to purple-brown scabers.

The lilac-brown bolete produces a pinkish to reddish-brown to amber-brown spore print. The smooth, translucent spores are narrowly spindle shaped and measure 11–17 by 3.5–5 μm. Collections made in Costa Rica have shorter spores (10.5–13.3 μm) and smaller fruitbodies than eastern North American material; Guyanese material also has smaller spores, measuring 9.7–12 μm. These differences are attributed to clinal variation. The basidia (spore-bearing cells) are club shaped, four-spored, and measure 23–30 by 7–8 μm. The cystidia on the pore edges (cheilocystidia) are narrowly spindle-shaped (fusoid), measuring 20–30 by 7–8 μm. Cystidia on the pore surface (pleurocystidia) are thin-walled, fusoid to swollen (ventricose), with dimensions of 27–42 by 8–12 μm. There are no clamp connections in the hyphae of Sutorius eximius.

=== Similar species ===
Lookalikes

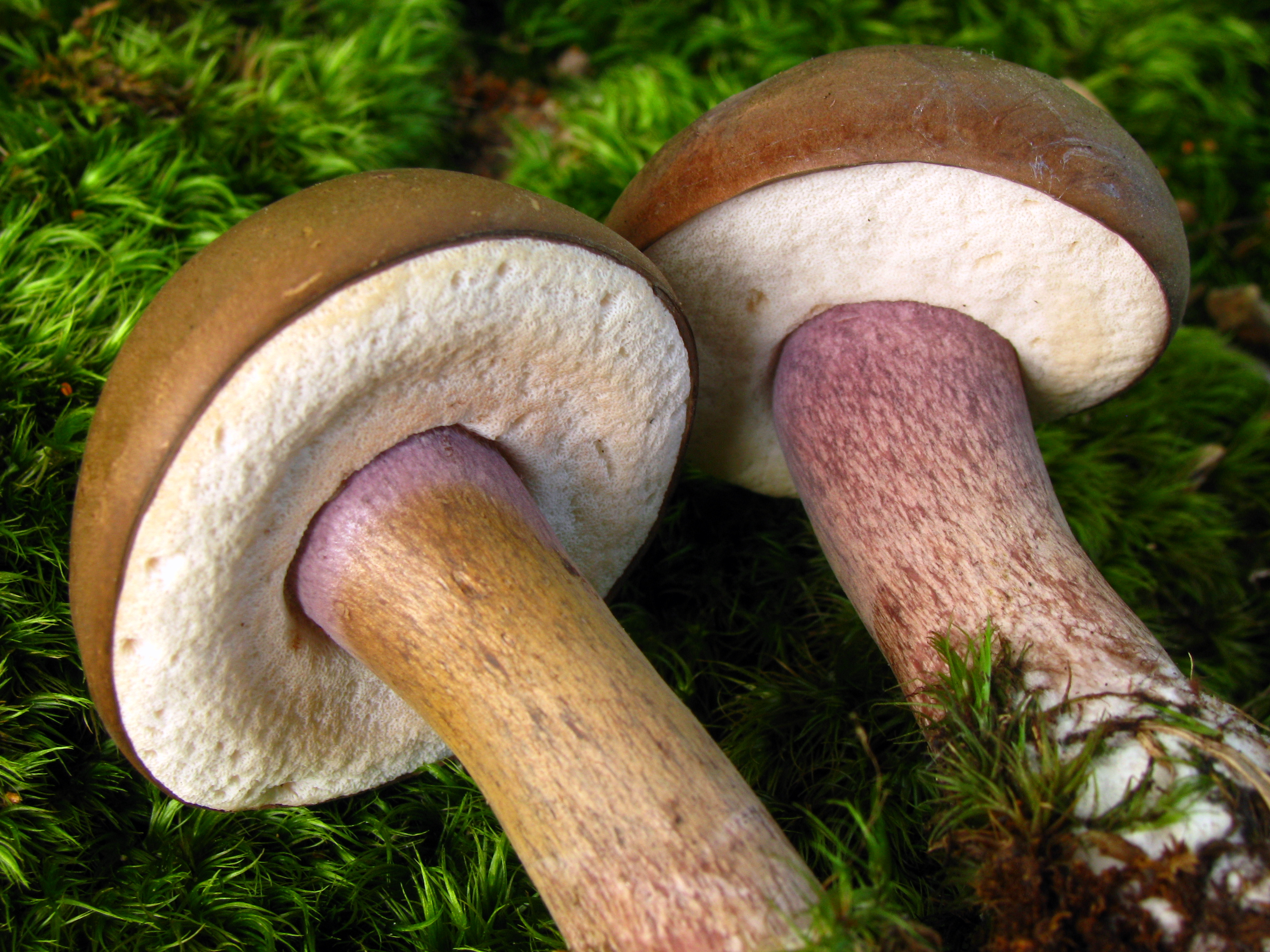
Tylopilus plumbeoviolaceus

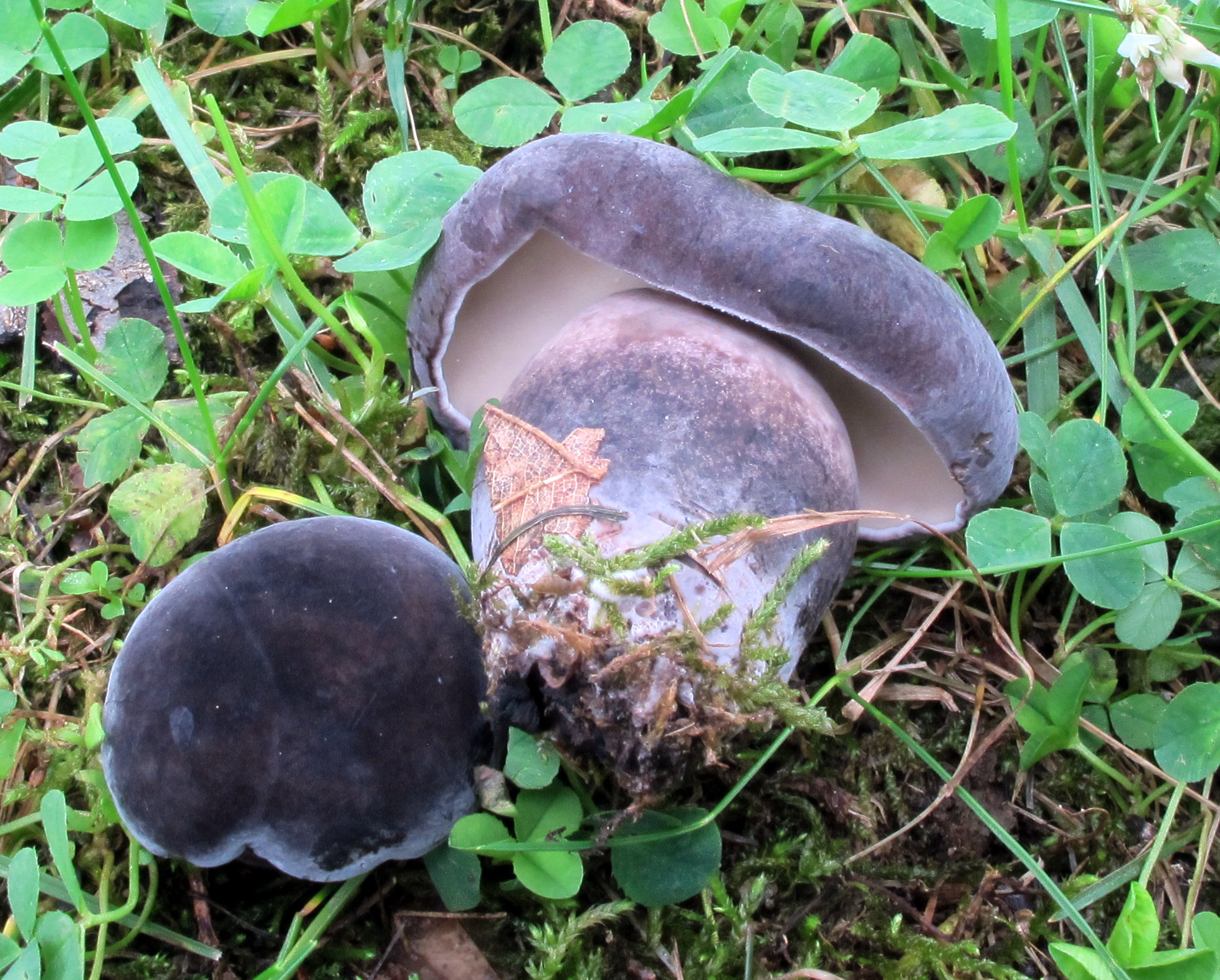
Tylopilus alboater

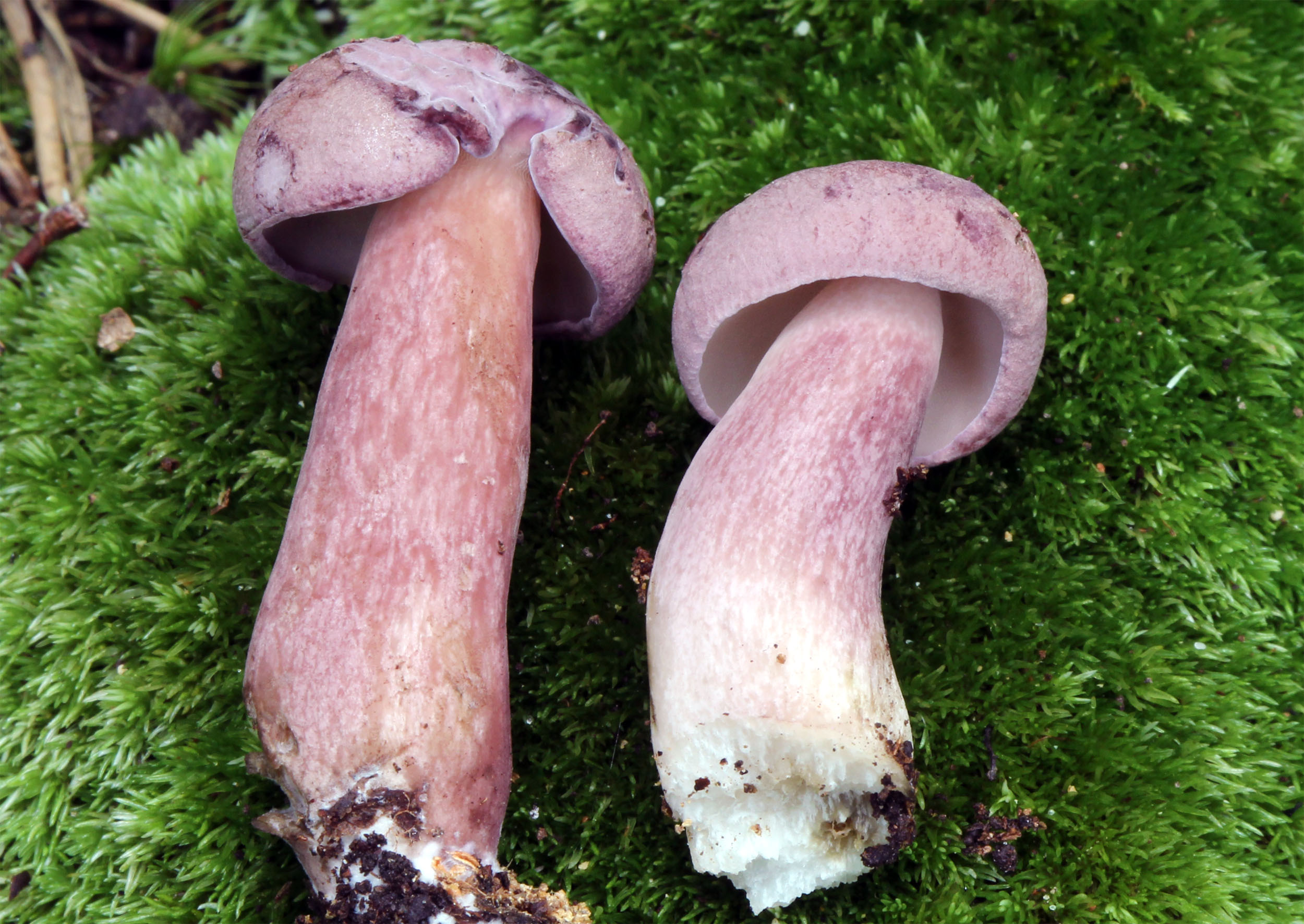
Tylopilus violatinctus

The Australian congener Sutorius australiensis produces somewhat smaller and darker fruitbodies than S. eximius. The violet-grey bolete, Tylopilus plumbeoviolaceus, is found in eastern North America and Korea. This species is somewhat similar in appearance, but can be distinguished by its smoother stipe, less brownish colors, and bitter taste. The Asian and North American black velvet bolete,T. alboater, has a black to grayish-brown cap and grows in deciduous woods. T. violatinctus, found in eastern North America, has whitish pores, a smooth stipe, and a somewhat paler cap than S. eximius. Porphyrellus porphyrosporus also has dark pores but is more blackish than purple.

== Habitat and distribution ==
Fruit bodies of Sutorius eximius grow in the soil singly or scattered among leaf litter. A mycorrhizal species, the bolete has been recorded growing in association with plants from various genera, including Dicymbe, Dipterocarpus, Fagus, Hopea, Quercus, Shorea, and Tsuga. The species has been recorded from North America (in the east from June to September), Costa Rica, and Indonesia. In Costa Rica, where it usually associates with the endemic oaks Quercus seemannii and Q. copeyensis, the lilac-brown bolete can be locally abundant in the Cordillera Central and the Cordillera de Talamanca. Additional locations with collections that have not been confirmed by DNA analysis include Guyana, Japan, China. Although S. eximius has been reported from Thailand, molecular analysis of Thai collections suggests that they represent a distinct, as-yet unnamed species.

== Edibility ==
Sutorius eximius is typically considered an edible mushroom, and listed as so in several North American field guides. Charles McIlvaine and Louis Krieger both wrote favorably of the bolete, but a series of gastroenteritis-like poisonings reported from both Canada and New England have cast doubt on potential edibility. According to Greg Marley, author Roger Phillips was the first to include a toxicity warning in his 1991 book Mushrooms of North America. Despite this, the lilac-brown bolete remains one of the most common mushrooms eaten by people living in the Hengduan Mountains region of southwestern China.

== Chemistry ==
Tylopilusins are novel bisphenol-class pigments isolated from the fruit bodies of Sutorius eximius. Tylopilusins A and B were identified in 2012, while tylopilusin C was reported a year later. Other pigments reported to occur in the fruit bodies include gyroporin and caffeic acid.
