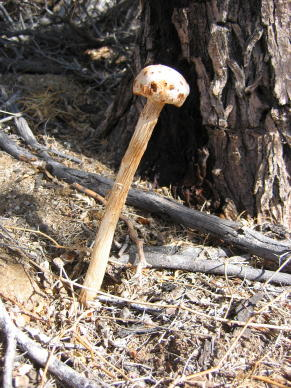
- Battarraeoides diguetii

Scientific classification
- Kingdom: Fungi
- Division: Basidiomycota
- Class: Agaricomycetes
- Order: Agaricales
- Family: Agaricaceae
- Genus: Battarreoides; T.Herrera (1953)

Type species
- Battarreoides diguetii (Pat. & Har.) R.Heim & T.Herrera (1953)

Synonyms
- Battarraeastrum R.Heim & T.Herrera (1960)

= Battarreoides =

Genus of fungi

Battarreoides (orth. var. Battarraeoides) is a fungal genus in the family Agaricaceae. It is a monotypic genus, containing the single species Battarreoides diguetii, found in desert regions of North America. The fungus was originally named Battarreoides potosinus by Teófilo Herrera Suárez in 1951.

== See also ==
- List of Agaricales genera
- List of Agaricaceae genera
