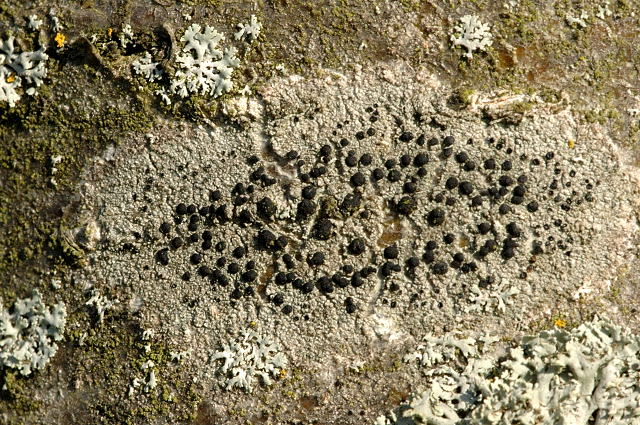

Conservation status
- Secure (NatureServe)

Scientific classification
- Kingdom: Fungi
- Division: Ascomycota
- Class: Lecanoromycetes
- Order: Caliciales
- Family: Caliciaceae
- Genus: Buellia
- Species: B. disciformis

Binomial name
- Buellia disciformis (Fr.) Mudd (1861)

Synonyms
- Lecidea parasema var. disciformis Fr. (1826)

= Buellia disciformis =

Species of lichen

Buellia disciformis, the boreal button lichen, is a thin, bluish to pale gray rimose to areolate crustose lichen that grows on bark (rarely also on wood) in temperate forests in the northern US and Europe, and at high altitudes in Arizona, down to 500 metres (1,600 ft) in coastal areas of California. Flat apothecia with black discs are 0.2–0.7 mm in diameter and sessile (neither raised or immersed in the thallus), with noticeable lecideine margins. Lichen spot tests are negative except for K+ yellow. Secondary metabolites include atranorin, fulgidin, and sometimes traces of fulgoicin and norfulgoicin. B. erubescens is similar and more often found on wood than the bark-loving B. disciformis, and has smaller spores.

== See also ==
- List of Buellia species
