= Sutorius magnificus =

Scientific classification
- Domain: Eukaryota
- Kingdom: Fungi
- Division: Basidiomycota
- Class: Agaricomycetes
- Order: Boletales
- Family: Boletaceae
- Genus: Sutorius
- Species: S. magnificus

Binomial name
- Sutorius magnificus (W.F. Chiu) G. Wu & Zhu L. Yang

Synonyms
- Neoboletus magnificus (W.F. Chiu) Gelardi, Simonini & Vizzini

Species of fungus

Sutorius magnificus, known until 2014 as Boletus magnificus, is a species of bolete fungus in the family Boletaceae native to Yunnan province in China. It was transferred to the new genus Neoboletus in 2014, and then Sutorius in 2016.

== See also ==
- Hallucinogenic bolete mushroom
