= Baculifera confusa =

Scientific classification
- Kingdom: Fungi
- Division: Ascomycota
- Class: Lecanoromycetes
- Order: Caliciales
- Family: Caliciaceae
- Genus: Baculifera
- Species: B. confusa

Binomial name
- Baculifera confusa Elix (2020)
- Holotype site: Murray Bridge, South Australia

Species of lichen

Baculifera confusa is a species of lignicolous (wood-dwelling), crustose lichen in the family Caliciaceae. It is found in Australia.

== Taxonomy ==
Baculifera confusa was formally described as a new species in 2020 by Australian lichenologist the John Elix. The species name confusa follows from its previous confusion with Baculifera xylophila. The type locality of Baculifera confusa was collected in South Australia at Murray Park Flora and Fauna Reserve, Murray Bridge. It was found at an altitude of 30 m (98 ft), growing on dead wood in remnant mallee scrub with Callitris and Eucalyptus. The holotype was collected by the author on 31 December 2005.

== Description ==
The thallus of Baculifera confusa is crustose, endophloeodal and not apparent, or epiphloedal, extending up to approximately 15 mm wide. It varies in colour from pale grey to dark brown and is up to 100 μm thick. The lichen has a rimose or rimose-areolate texture, with areoles measuring 0.1–0.4 mm wide. The lichen does not produce soredia, and the prothallus is marginal, black when abutting other lichens, or not apparent. The medulla lacks calcium oxalate, and the photobiont cells are 10–20 μm wide.

The species is similar to Baculifera xylophila, but it can be distinguished by its colourless to pale yellow-brown hypothecium, smaller ascospores measuring 11–17 by 6–8 μm, and shorter conidia, 5–6 μm long.

== Habitat and distribution ==
Baculifera confusa is found on dead wood in inland areas of southern Western Australia, South Australia, and New South Wales. It often coexists with other lichen species such as Amandinea extenuata, Austromelanelixia piliferella, Austroparmelina conlabrosa, A. pseudorelicina, Buellia reagenella, Flavoparmelia rutidota, Japewiella variabilis, Physcia jackii, Ramboldia brunneocarpa, and Usnea inermis.
