= Sutorius australiensis =

Scientific classification
- Domain: Eukaryota
- Kingdom: Fungi
- Division: Basidiomycota
- Class: Agaricomycetes
- Order: Boletales
- Family: Boletaceae
- Genus: Sutorius
- Species: S. australiensis

Binomial name
- Sutorius australiensis (Peck) Halling, Nuhn, & Osmundson (2012)

Synonyms
- Leccinum australiense Bougher & Thiers (1991)

Species of fungus

Sutorius australiensis is a species of bolete mushroom found in Australia. It was first described in 1991 as a species of Leccinum, but transferred to the newly created genus Sutorius in 2012.
