= Khuskia =

Scientific classification
- Kingdom: Fungi
- Division: Ascomycota
- Class: Sordariomycetes
- Informal group: Sordariomycetes incertae sedis
- Genus: Khuskia; H.J.Huds. (1963)

Type species
- Khuskia oryzae H.J.Huds. (1963)

Genus of fungi

Khuskia is a fungal genus in the class Sordariomycetes. The relationship of this taxon to other taxa within the class is unknown (incertae sedis). A monotypic genus, it contains the single species Khuskia oryzae, described as new to science in 1963.
