= Sphaeropsis oncidii =

Scientific classification
- Kingdom: Fungi
- Division: Ascomycota
- Class: Dothideomycetes
- Order: Botryosphaeriales
- Family: Botryosphaeriaceae
- Genus: Sphaeropsis
- Species: S. oncidii

Binomial name
- Sphaeropsis oncidii (Henn.) Petr. & Syd.

Synonyms
- Botryodiplodia oncidii (Henn.) Petr. & Syd.; Macrophoma oncidii Henn.

Species of fungus

Sphaeropsis oncidii is an ascomycete fungus that is a plant pathogen. It causes dieback on Cattleya.
