= Teófilo Herrera Suárez =

Mexican mycologist (1924–2020)

- Born: February 24, 1924; Mexico City, Mexico
- Died: 23 April 2020 (aged 96)
- Education: Universidad Nacional Autonoma de Mexico
- Known for: contributions to the Mexican mycoflora
- Awards: see honors section
- Scientific career
- Fields: Mycology
- Workplaces: Universidad Nacional Autonoma de Mexico
- Doctoral advisor: Manuel Ruíz-Oronoz

Teófilo Herrera Suárez (24 February 1924 – 23 April 2020) was a Mexican mycologist who was known for his contributions to the Mexican mycological flora. He was also an emeritus professor at the National Autonomous University of Mexico (UNAM), where he worked for over 50 years.

== Professional training ==
Herrera is originally from Mexico City. In 1940 he enrolled in the UNAM National High School. In 1942 he decided to study Biology instead of Medicine thanks to the positive influence of his teacher Francisco Villagran. He began as an undergraduate student in the Faculty of Sciences at UNAM and got his degree in 1945. Later on, he moved to the US to pursue a master's degree in Microbiology and Biochemistry of Fermentation, which he obtained in 1953 from the University of Wisconsin in Madison. He expanded his knowledge getting a second bachelor's degree in 1954, this time in Chemical Biology and Parasitology at the School of Biological Sciences from the National Polytechnic Institute (IPN). Further on, he began his Doctorate's degree at UNAM; he focused his research in "gasteroid fungi" and got his degree with honors in 1964 with his thesis: "Gasteromycetes of the Valley of Mexico".

== Scientific career ==
=== Early career ===
He began his teaching career in 1946, right after getting his bachelor's degree, as a lab assistant at the UNAM National High School. Further, he taught in different public and private schools, diverse courses such as Biology, Anthropology and Zootechny. He started as an instructor in 1952 in the Faculty of Sciences teaching for undergraduate students at UNAM, where he eventually taught for over 50 years lectures in Botany, Microbiology, Mycology, and History of Science.

=== 1940s–1950s ===
He started as an assistant researcher for Manuel Ruíz Oronoz, his mentor, in 1945. Ruíz Oronoz's research was focused on studying fermenting microorganisms from "pulque". Throughout his scientific career, Herrera has remained interested in fermenting microorganisms behind traditional Mexican alcoholic beverages. Herrera participated in the isolation and identification of pulque fungi, commonly called "pulqueros", such as: Saccharomyces cerevisiae, Pichia membranaefaciens, Candida boidini, C. incospicua, and numerous species of the genera Kloeckera, Rhodotorula and Torulopsis. In 2003 he published a book entitled: "Más allá del pulque y el tepache" ("Beyond pulque and tepache"), in which he writes about these two beverages as well as other traditional Mexican alcoholic beverages such as "pozol", "tesgüino" and "colonche". In this book, as well as in the rest of his research, he always provides information of the social impact and history behind it.

During the late 1940s and early 1950s, Herrera and his collaborator Gastón Guzmán were the only scientists focused on studying macromycetes in Mexico. In fact in 1948, Herrera published the description of Podaxis pistillaris. Later, with Guzmán, he published a compilation of more than 100 pages with 82 different species of edible mushrooms from the local markets in Mexico; it was published in the Anales del Instituto de Biología.

During the late 1950s he became interested in hallucinogenic mushrooms from several regions of Mexico, specifically Huautla de Jiménez, Oaxaca, in the Mazateca Sierra. Like his previous studies, he did not only study the taxonomy, ecology, and distribution of hallucinogenic mushrooms, but he focused part of his research in social impacts, learning about these fungi directly from the local shaman, María Sabina. His ecological research in hallucinogenic mushrooms determined the environmental conditions for these organisms to grow: oak and coniferous forests between 1,300 and 2,600 msl. However, further studies showed that hallucinogenic fungi can also grow, although rarely, at sea level (Psilocybe cubensis), and above 3,500 msl (Psilocybe aztecorum). During 1958 he focused his research in culturing, under laboratory conditions, the hallucinogenic mushroom Psilocybe cubensis. Further on, he described the hallucinogenic effects of Psilocybe based on personal experience, which were published in the Mexican journal "Neurología",:

(Translation to English)

"Increased blood pressure and body temperature as well as increased heart rate and pulse, other effects may be present, such as shivers, flushing or paleness, nauseas, tremor and heavy legs; in some cases headache, dizziness, euphoria, and changes in behavior; almost always, occurrence of hallucinations shaped like geometric bright figures of various and changing colors like a kaleidoscope, changes in the understanding with rapid disintegration and confusion of ideas, difficulty to distinguish reality from fiction, loss of space and location, sense of shortening or elongated as well as distorted or disconnected body parts; schizophrenia, namely, split personality, feeling apart from the body and mind. All of these trigger a state of anguish, unable to distinguish between real and unreal, but generally, a feel that there is direct communication with god or supernatural forces or beings. In general, the psychotropic effect lasts for four to five hours but it can last longer, there can be sporadic manifestations even several days after the ingestion of hallucinogenic mushrooms."

In mid-1960s he began studying macromycetes from the Valley of Mexico, specifically the class Gasteromycetes (currently obsolete). He published an individual and detailed analysis of each of the following genera: Myriostoma, Cyathus, Phallus, Battarrea and Tulostoma. He then expanded his research to other areas of Mexico: Sonora, State of Mexico and Campeche, focusing in the genus Geastrum. During this time he was interested in identifying edible mushrooms from these regions. With this particular research area, Herrera, instilled interest in the cultivation of Agaricus bisporus and Pleurotus in Mexico; currently is a fruitful and well-remunerated activity. At the same time he was interested in identifying toxic mushrooms in Mexico. He carried out research in toxic fungi such as Amanita virosa, A. verna and A. bisporigera, which cause the majority of fatal poisoning in Mexico.

=== 1960s–1970s ===
At the end of the 1960s and beginning of the 1970s he became interested in studying the macromycetes from arid ecosystems of Mexico; in collaboration with Gastón Guzmán they became pioneers in this research area. At the same time he continued to describe the Mexican fungal flora from the Valley of Mexico. In 1965 he published a detailed study of the systematic, histology and ecology of the genus Helvella in the Valley of Mexico.

=== 1990s–present ===
In the early 1990s he characterized the macromycetes of the Yucatan Peninsula. At the same time he characterized the gasteroid fungal diversity of the state of Sonora and studied the ecological distribution and etnomycological importance of the genus Schizophyllum in Mexico.

During late 90s he published the book: Hongos medicinales y sagrados de México ("Medicinal and sacred mushrooms of Mexico") and collaborated in the characterization of microscopic fungal diversity and abundance from several beaches in Mexico from the states of Veracruz, Quintana Roo and Colima, covering the Pacific Ocean, the Gulf of Mexico and the Caribbean Sea; they reported a total of 52 species.

In 2002 he published a study about the distribution in Mexico of Batarrea phalloides.

During 2003 he studied the distribution of Geastrum species in the state of Sonora.

In 2005 he characterized the gasteroid fungi of "Calakmul" in Campeche.

In 2006 he characterized the myxomycete's diversity of the national reserve of "Ajos-Bavispe" in the state of Sonora. Additionally he reported new records of several species of Agaricales for the state of Sonora and characterized the diversity of macromycetes of the "Pinacate and great Altar desert reserve".

In 2008, Herrera collaborated in a research project aiming to identify the yeasts associated with the production of Mexican alcoholic non distilled and distilled agave beverages; this research was published in FEMS Yeast Research. During the same time he collaborated in a research related to toxic macromycetes from the state of Sonora.

Further on, in 2009, he collaborated in the characterization of the macromycetes in the ecological reserve of "Pedregal San Angel" in Mexico City.

In 2010 he collaborated in a research regarding radioactive accumulation in fungi and their relation to rodents in forests of the nuclear center in Mexico.

In 2011, he published a short communication about the first records of fungi collected in 1793-1794 during the first expedition of Sessé and Mociño to Mexico (called "Nueva España" at the time)(Pérez-Silva et al.. 2011, b). This same year he published new records of macromycetes for Temascaltepec in the State of Mexico (Pérez-Silva et al.. 2011, a).

=== Academic merits ===
Herrera's knowledge has been embodied in more than 140 scientific papers, published both in national as well as international journals, all of them peer reviewed. He has written more than 9 text books for middle school and high school as well as books for public in general, interested in botany and mycology. Additionally all of his books have been written in Spanish, his native language, making his knowledge available to Spanish-speaking people. An example of his success are the books "El reino de los hongos" ("The fungal kingdom") and "Etimología e iconografía de géneros de hongos" ("Etymology and iconography of the fungal genera"), both of them written in collaboration with M. Ulloa, widely used in Spanish-speaking universities to teach mycology. Another example is the book entitled: "Breve historia de la botánica en México" (Brief history of botany in Mexico") written in collaboration with M. Ortega, J.L. Godínez and A. Butanda, used in Mexican universities to teach introduction to Botany.

He also has technical titles such as: "Fermentaciones tradicionales de México" ("Traditional fermentations from Mexico"), and "Las bebidas alcohólicas no destiladas indígenas de México" ("Alcoholic non-distilled beverages from natives in Mexico"), both of them written with several of his close collaborators.

Additionally he collaborated with the Mexican encyclopedia making nearly 1000 cards in 12 different volumes about the Mexican flora. In 2007, with two of his collaborators, he published an illustrated dictionary of mycology.

Herrera integrated and consolidated several research groups and collaboration networks that he has kept along in his successful career.

He reported for the first time in Mexico, countless fungal species, including: Coprinus plicatilis, Psathyrella pseudocorrugis and P. pseudogracilis.

Herrera described several new fungal species: Batarrea potosinus (currently known as Batarrea diguetti), Bovista ruizii, Batarreoides potosinus, Podocrea cornubovis, Hansenula pozolis, Candida parapsilopsis var. tuxtlensis, Kloeckera corticis var. pulquensis, Torulopsis taboadae and Candida queretana. He also described several new bacterial species: Chromatium ruizi, Agrobacterium azotophilum, Achromobacter pozolis, and Pseudomona mexicana.

== Honors ==
At the beginning of his scientific career, in the late 1940s, he began the collection of macromycetes at the National herbarium MEXU, which is the largest in Mexico and still remains in operation; at present it carries his name. The UNAM laboratory of mycology and phytopathology is also named after Herrera. In addition, the etnomycological herbarium from the agricultural institute of Oaxaca, as well as the mycological collection in the herbarium at the Autonomous University of Aguascalientes were also named after Herrera.

Herrera has belonged to the Mexican National Scientists System (SNI) since 1983 and he was named Emeritus Professor by UNAM in 1990. He was a founding member of several scientific societies, both national and international: "Mexican Society of Mycology", "Latinamerican Society of Microbiology", "Mexican Society of Genetics" and the "Mexican Society of Etnobiology". He has been awarded by UNAM for "successful scientific career" for 25, 35, 40, 45 and 50 years of contributions to science. He led the project, in collaboration with Pérez-Silva and Cifuentes: "Contributions to the knowledge of Mexican mushrooms", which resulted in more than 49 peer-reviewed publications, 5 books, 10 chapters in books, 12 bachelor's degree theses, 12 master's degree theses and 6 PhD theses, as well as 149 conference presentations (87 in national conferences and 62 in international conferences).

Several new fungal species have been named after him: Psilocybe herrerrae, P. teofilae, P. novozoncuantlensis, Bovista herrerae, Gerronema theophili, Crinipellis herrerae, Hemimycena herrerae, Amanita herrerae, Opuntia tomentosa var. herrerae and Polyprectopus herrerai.

== Selected publications ==
- Guzmán G, Herrera T. Macromicetos de las zonas áridas de México. II. Gasteromycetos, 1969. Anales del Instituto de Biología UNAM Serie Botánica 40(1):1–92.
- Pérez-Silva E, Herrera T, Ocampo-Lopez A, Nuevos registros de macromicetos para el municipio de Temascaltepec, Estado de Mexico, 2011. Revista mexicana de micología 34:23–30.
- Perez-Silva E, Herrera T, Ocampo Lopez A, Registro de hongos recolectados por Sessé y Mociño durante la primera real expedición botánica a la Nueva España, México, 2011. Revista mexicana de micología 33:63–65.
- Pérez-Silva E, Esqueda M, Herrera T, Coronado M, Nuevos registros de Agaricales de Sonora, México, 2006. Revista mexicana de biodiversidad, 77(1)
- Pérez–Silva, E, Herrera T, Iconografía de macromicetos de México I. Amanita, 1991. Instituto de Biología, Publicaciones Especiales 6. Universidad Nacional Autónoma de México, México.
- Pérez–Silva E, Aguirre CE, Herrera T, Descripción y nuevos registros de hongos micoparásitos de México, 1983. Boletín de la Sociedad Mexicana de Micología 18: 71–84.
- Pérez–Silva E, Herrera T, Macromicetos tóxicos: Chlorophyllum molybdites causante de micetismo gastrointestinal en México, 1986. Boletín de la Sociedad Mexicana de Historia Natural 38:27–36.

== See also ==
List of mycologists
