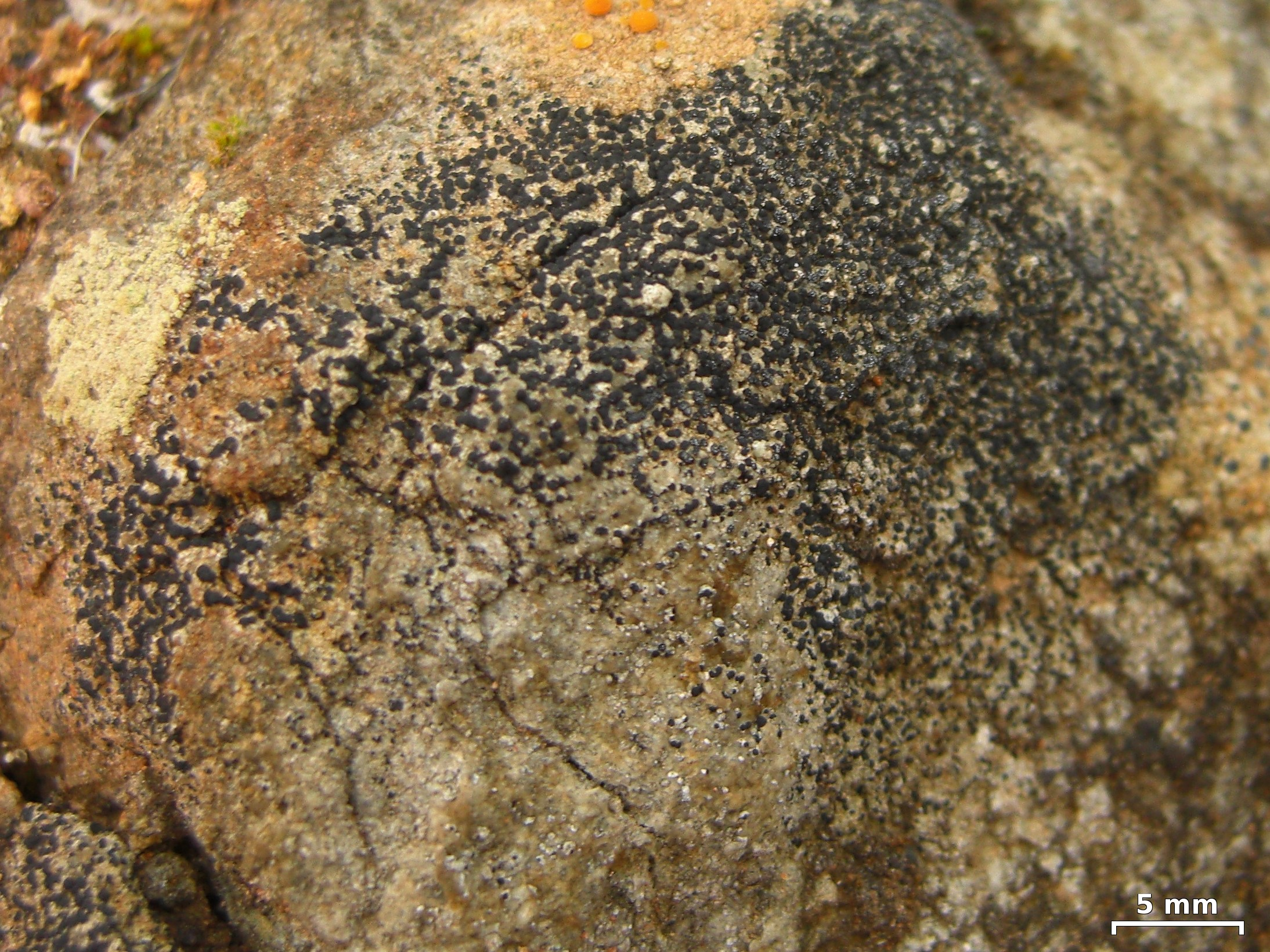

Scientific classification
- Kingdom: Fungi
- Division: Ascomycota
- Class: Lecanoromycetes
- Order: Caliciales
- Family: Caliciaceae
- Genus: Buellia
- Species: B. abstracta

Binomial name
- Buellia abstracta (Nyl.) H.Olivier (1903)

= Buellia abstracta =

Species of fungus

Buellia abstracta (synonym – Buellia sequax) is a crustose lichen.

In California, it is the most commonly occurring member of the Buellia genus, and is common in the Mojave Desert.

== See also ==
- List of Buellia species
