= William Mudd =

British lichenologist (1829–1879)

- Born: 1829; Bedale, Yorkshire, England
- Died: 14 April 1879 (aged 49–50); Cambridge, England
- Occupations: Gardener; Curator, Cambridge Botanic Garden
- Known for: lichenology; first book describing lichens of Britain and Ireland
- Notable work: A Manual of British Lichens (1861)

William Mudd (1829 - 1879) compiled the first flora of the lichens of the British Isles, in 1861. He was curator of Cambridge Botanic Garden in 1864.

== Personal life ==
William Mudd was born in Bedale, Yorkshire, UK, on the Clifton Castle estate, where his father was employed as the steward. His date of birth is unknown but Mudd was baptised on 26 April 1829. He was one of eight siblings. His parents were Mary (née Purvis) and Christopher Mudd. Mudd married Jane Preston in 1849 and they had four sons together. They initially lived in Great Ayton, later moving to Cambridge. Mudd had strong Quaker religious beliefs. He died at home on 19 April 1879.

== Career ==
Mudd was employed in country house gardens, initially training in gardening at the Darlington estate of the Pease family and then moving to take charge of another estate. He met George Dixon (1812–1904), superintendent of the North of England Agricultural School and began to study, first practical horticulture and then botany including microscopy. Mudd became interested in lichens and began corresponding with other British and European lichen enthusiasts. His expertise was recognised.

Mudd compiled the first book describing the lichens of Britain and Ireland, published in 1861. He corresponded and exchanged specimens with people across Europe who were also interested in lichens. This led Mudd to use microscopic fungal spore characters as part of his method to identify lichen species. He included drawings of ascospores of 130 species which continue to be useful in resolving identification of lichen specimens.

In 1864 Mudd was appointed as the curator of Cambridge Botanic Garden with a salary of £100, and he undertook private coaching of students to supplement his low salary. There is a note that he improved the condition of the botanic garden substantially, but he ceased work on lichens. However, he may have suffered from ill health and also have found the social environment of the university and town difficult. He continued as curator until his death in 1879.

== Publications ==
Mudd published his first paper, on lichens of the Cleveland area, in 1854. He also produced books and exsiccatae.

- William Mudd (1861) A Manual of British Lichens, description of all the species and varieties, five plates, with figures of the spores of one hundred and thirty species, illustrative of the genera 309 pp. together with a collection of specimens, the exsiccata Herbarium Lichenum Britannicorum (1861). The specimens on which this book was based formed part of Mudd's personal collection. These are now in the Herbarium at Natural History Museum, London and were re-discovered in 2014.
- William Mudd (1865) A monograph of British Cladoniae, illustrated with dried specimens of eighty species and varieties: The exsiccata was released after he had moved to Cambridge but the exsiccatae specimens were probably collected earlier when he was in Yorkshire.

== Awards and legacy ==
Mudd was elected as an associate fellow of the Linnean Society in 1868, and of the Botanical Society of Edinburgh in 1877. Mudd's personal collection of lichens are within herbaria at Natural History Museum, London, Oxford University, Great North Museum: Hancock and the Falconer Museum in Forres, Scotland (closed in 2019). Material he collected is in European collections such as the University of Vienna.
