= Beniowskia =

Scientific classification
- Kingdom: Fungi
- Division: Ascomycota
- Class: incertae sedis
- Order: incertae sedis
- Family: incertae sedis
- Genus: Beniowskia; Racib.
- Species: B. sphaeroidea

Binomial name
- Beniowskia sphaeroidea (Kalchbr. & Cooke) E.W. Mason (1928)

Synonyms
- Aegerita penniseti Henn. (1904); Beniowskia graminis Racib. (1900); Beniowskia macrospora M.D. Mehrotra (1964); Beniowskia penniseti Wakef. (1916); Botrytis uredinicola Peck (1909); Ceratium sphaeroideum Kalchbr. & Cooke (1880); Clathrotrichum subcarneum Pat. (1921); Sporotrichum peribebuyense Speg. (1886)

Species of fungus

Beniowskia sphaeroidea is an ascomycete fungus that is a plant pathogen. It is the only species in the genus Beniowskia.
