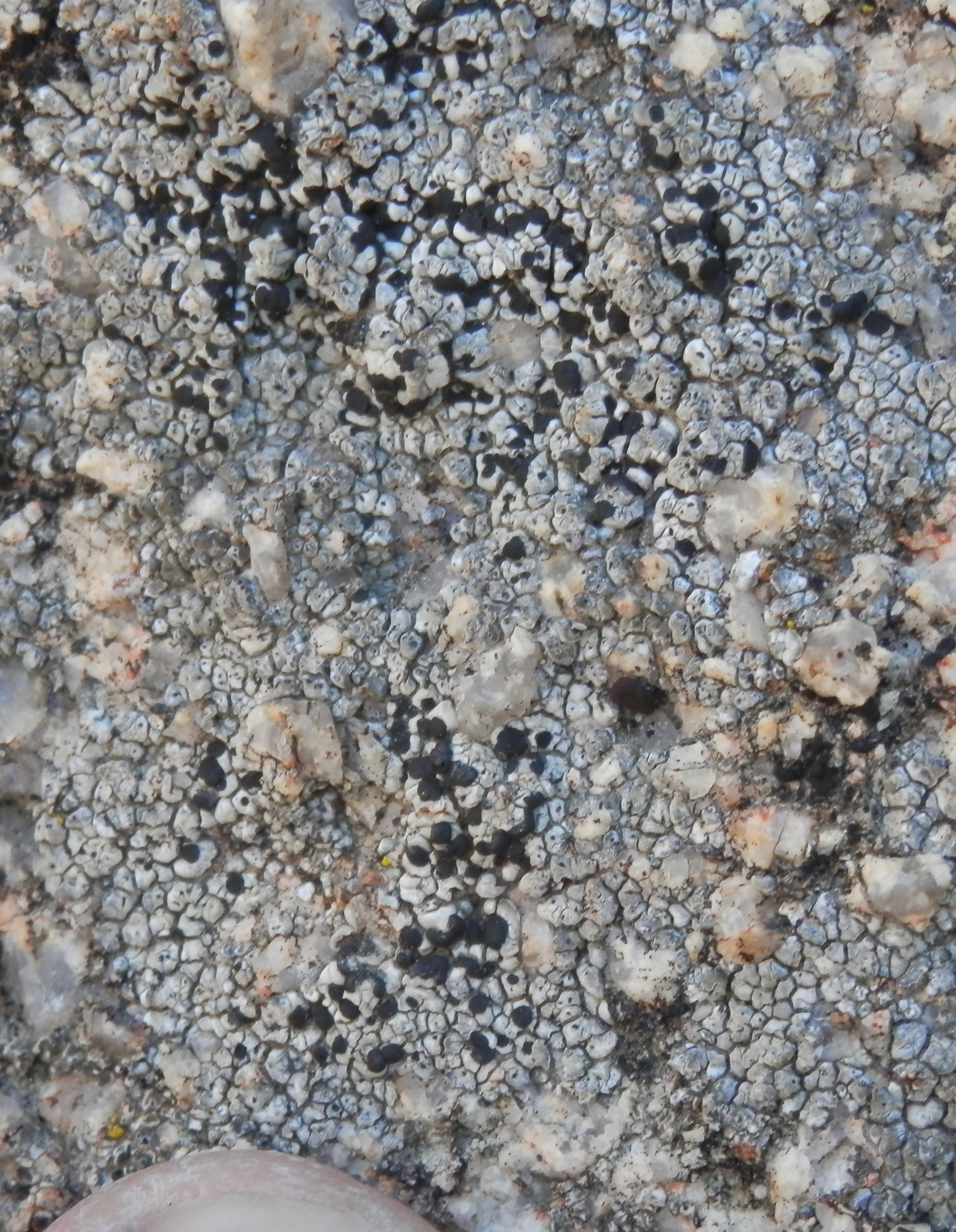

Scientific classification
- Kingdom: Fungi
- Division: Ascomycota
- Class: Lecanoromycetes
- Order: Caliciales
- Family: Caliciaceae
- Genus: Buellia
- Species: B. dispersa

Binomial name
- Buellia dispersa A.Massal. (1856)

= Buellia dispersa =

Species of lichen

Buellia dispersa is a dull white to beige or dark brown crustose areolate lichen that grows on non-calcareous rock, such as basalt, granite and gneiss, in arid to semi-arid areas of northern Africa, Europe, and southwestern North America. The areolas are distinct, becoming subsquamulose (lifting up at the edges) when separated and collecting in irregular patches, otherwise they form rosettes with lobed margins. There is no prothallus. It commonly occurs in the Mojave Desert, Channel Islands, and Santa Monica Mountains, also in the Cuyamaca Mountains, Santa Ana Mountains, and San Jacinto Mountains. It is among the most common lichen species in the Sonoran Desert.

== See also ==
- List of Buellia species
