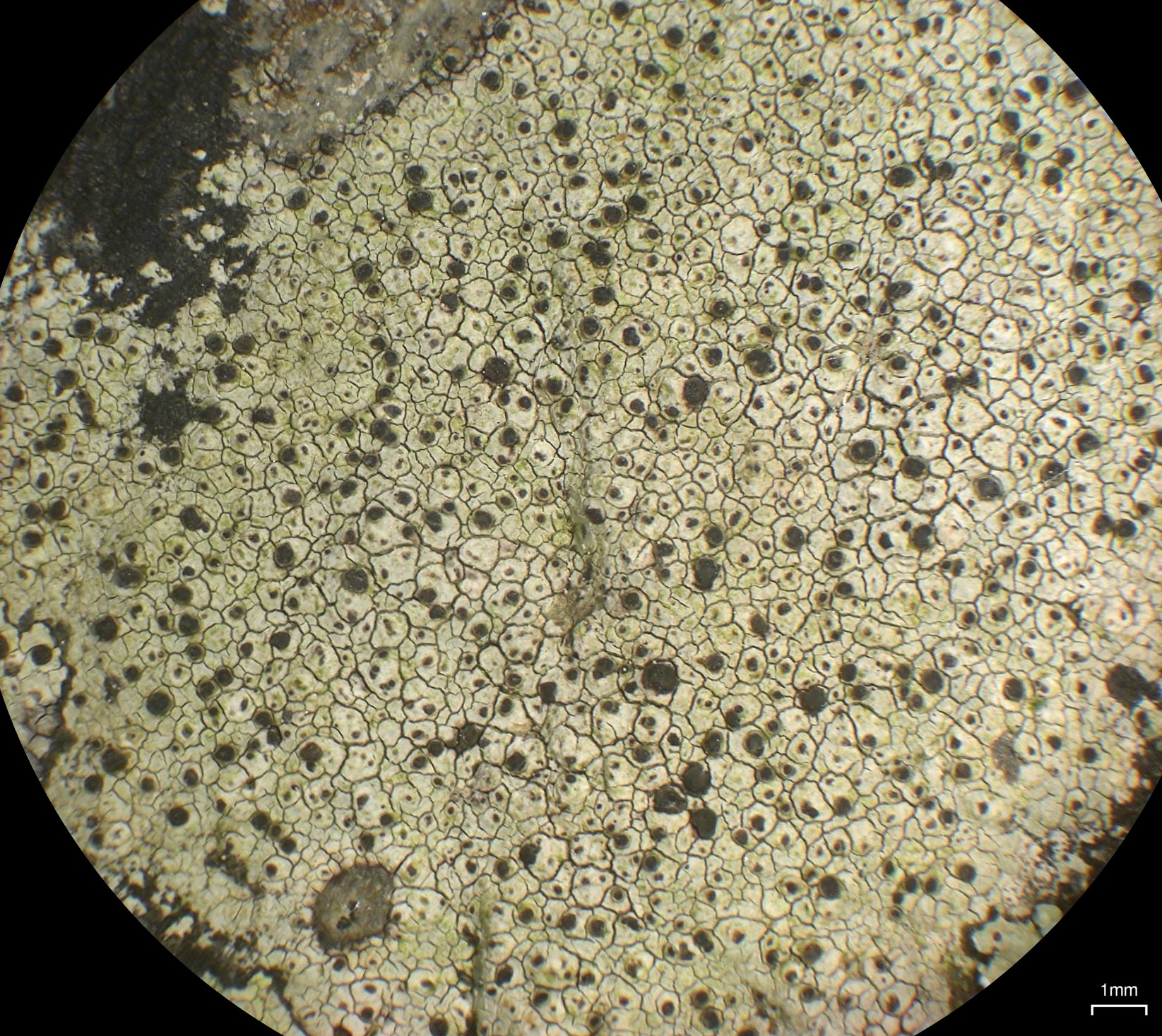

Conservation status
- Apparently Secure (NatureServe)

Scientific classification
- Kingdom: Fungi
- Division: Ascomycota
- Class: Lecanoromycetes
- Order: Caliciales
- Family: Caliciaceae
- Genus: Buellia
- Species: B. spuria

Binomial name
- Buellia spuria (Schaer.) Anzi (1860)

Synonyms
- Lecidea spuria Schaer. (1828)

= Buellia spuria =

Species of lichen

Buellia spuria, the disc lichen, is a white to light ashy gray crustose areolate lichen that grows on rocks (epilithic) in montane habitats. It has a black edge from the conspicuous, more or less continuous prothallus, which can also be seen in the cracks between the areolas forming a hypothallus, and in sharp contrast with the whitish or ashy colored areolas. It prefers mafic (siliceous) rock substrates. In Joshua Tree National Park is can be seen on vertical granite and gneiss faces in washes. It is common worldwide in the Northern Hemisphere. It is very common in the Sonoran Desert from southern California to Arizona, Baja California, and Sonora, Chihuahua, and Sinaloa, Mexico.

It is similar in appearance to Buellia stellulata, but has a different secondary chemistry, and B. spuria is common throughout the Sonoran Desert region, while B. stellulata is restricted to coastal regions.

== See also ==
- List of Buellia species
