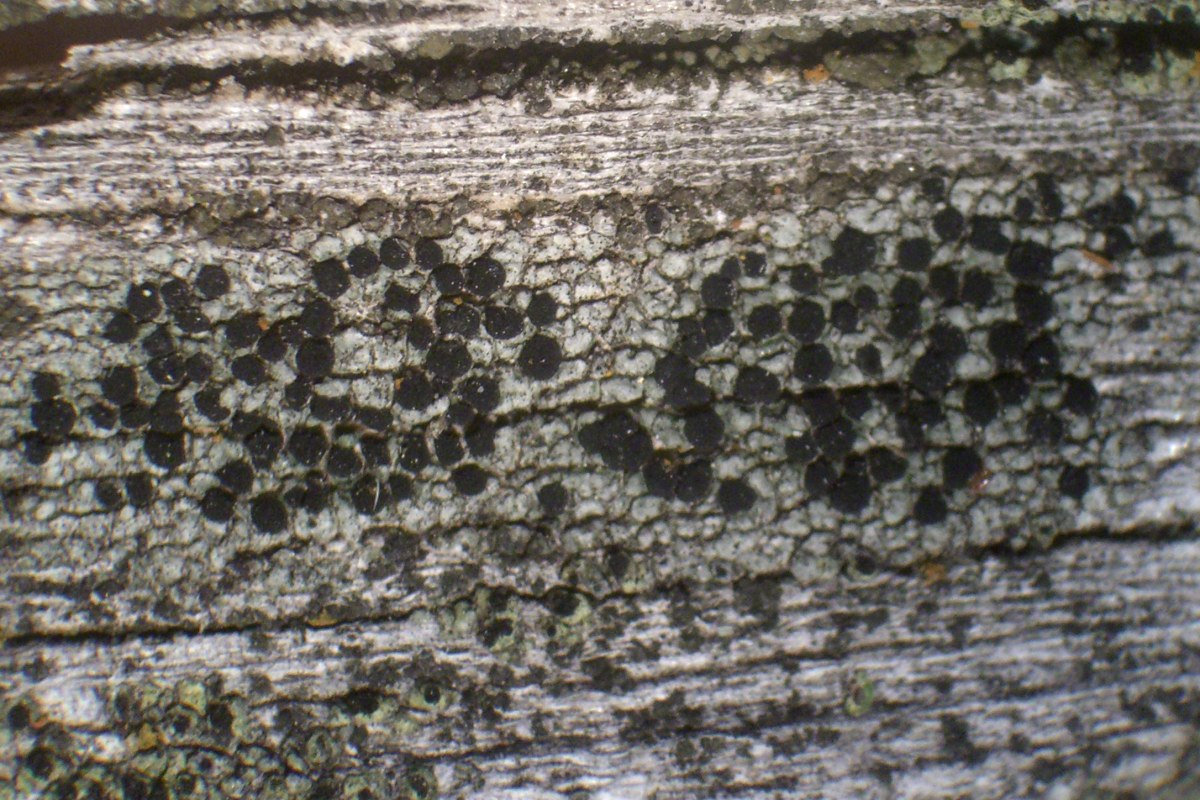
- Buellia chloroleuca

Scientific classification
- Kingdom: Fungi
- Division: Ascomycota
- Class: Lecanoromycetes
- Order: Caliciales
- Family: Caliciaceae
- Genus: Buellia; De Not. (1846)

Type species
- Buellia disciformis (Fr.) Mudd (1861)

Species
- about 240

Synonyms
- List: Anapyrenium Müll.Arg. (1880); Aplotomma A.Massal. ex Beltr. (1858); Buelliopsis A.Schneid. (1897); Chrismofulvea Marbach (2000); Kemmleria Körb. (1861); Lepropinacia Vent. (1799); Mattickiolichen Tomas. & Cif. (1952); Melanaspicilia Vain. (1909); Samboa Tomas. & Cif. (1952); Samboamyces Cif. & Tomas. (1953); Sambomyces Cif. & Tomas. (1953)

= Buellia =

Genus of lichens

Buellia is a genus of mostly lichen-forming fungi in the family Caliciaceae. The fungi are usually part of a crustose lichen. In this case, the lichen species is given the same name as the fungus. But members may also grow as parasites on lichens (lichenicolous). The algae in the lichen (the photobiont partner) is always a member of the genus Trebouxia.

Lichens in the genus are commonly called disc lichens, or button lichens. The genus has a widespread distribution and contains about 240 species.

Genetic studies indicate that the genus Amandinea and Buellia may be the same, although this is not widely accepted.

The genus Buellia was described by Italian botanist Giuseppe De Notaris in 1846 and named after his friend, Esperanzo Buelli.

== Description ==
Genus Buellia consists of lichens that are either lichenised or occasionally lichenicolous. This means they typically form a symbiotic relationship with a photosynthetic partner, or in some cases, parasitise other lichens. Most Buellia species are independent, forming their own visible thallus (lichen body), but some start as parasites and eventually develop independent thalli.

The thallus of Buellia species is crustose, meaning it forms a crust-like layer. Its appearance can range from continuous to patchy, and it may be cracked or broken into small, tile-like segments (areolate). In some cases, the thallus may develop into small scales or lobes. Often, there is a prothallus, which is a preliminary growth stage that typically appears dark and may form a thin outline or a more extensive network between the areoles. The surface of the thallus can be colourless or various shades of brown, yellow, or green, and it may be smooth, rough, or covered in a fine powder (pruinose). The margins of the thallus can be clearly defined or blend seamlessly into the substrate.

The primary photobiont (symbiotic partner conducting photosynthesis) in Buellia is usually a species of Trebouxia. The medulla, or inner tissue, is typically white but may contain yellow or orange pigments. Calcium oxalate crystals, which are colourless and needle-shaped, are often present in the medulla.

Apothecia, the reproductive structures where spores are formed, are common in Buellia. They can be flat, slightly concave, or convex, and are usually black or dark brown. The margin of the apothecium can vary in appearance, sometimes containing remnants of the thallus or being edged with thallus material. The hymenium (spore-producing layer) is clear but may contain oil droplets, and the paraphyses (filamentous structures) often have a distinct pigment cap, contributing to the colouration of the epihymenium (top layer of the hymenium).

The spores of Buellia are initially clear, turning olive gray and eventually dark brown, although in some species, they remain clear. They can have one or several partitions (septa) and come in various shapes, often being straight but sometimes curved. The development of the spores involves forming the septum before or after the development of pigmentation and wall differentiation. The spore wall is multilayered, sometimes with distinct thickening at the sides or septa.

In addition to apothecia, Buellia may also reproduce asexually through structures called pycnidia, which produce simple, bacilliform (rod-shaped), or filiform (thread-like) conidia (asexual spores). The conidiophores (structures that bear the conidia) within these pycnidia can vary in length and branching.

== Selected species ==
There are about 240 species accepted in the genus Buellia, including:

- Buellia abstracta
- Buellia asterella
- Buellia badia
- Buellia concinna
- Buellia disciformis
- Buellia dispersa
- Buellia spuria

== Gallery ==
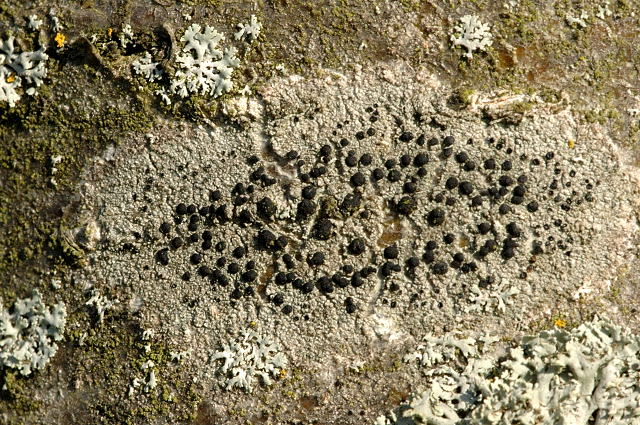
Buellia disciformis

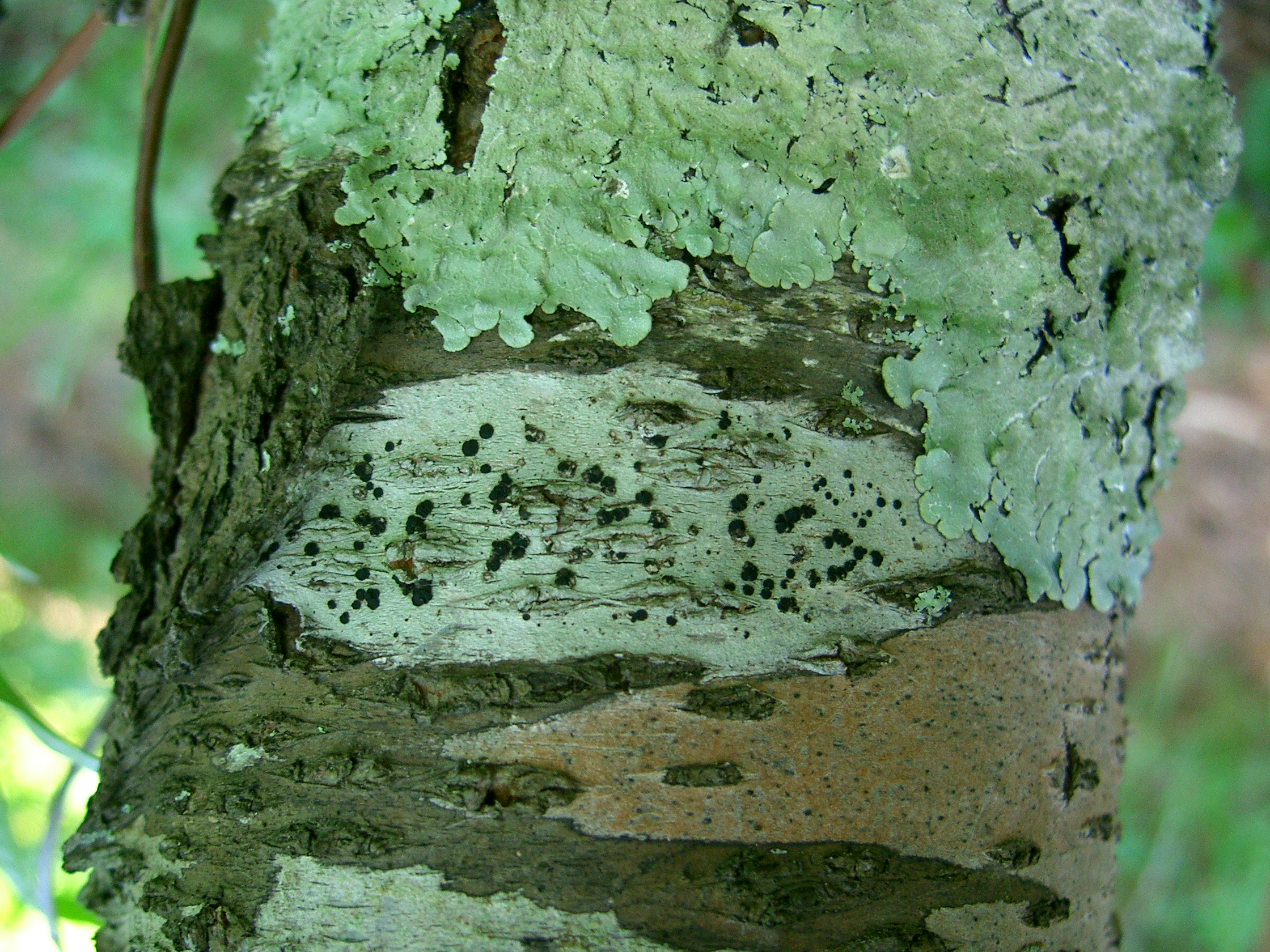
Buellia stillingiana

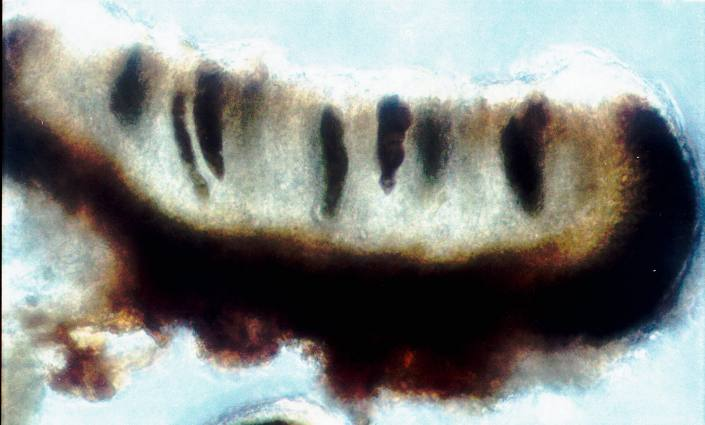
Photograph of a cross section of an apothecium from B. disciformis taken through a compound microscope (x400), showing numerous brown, 1-septate spores per ascus.

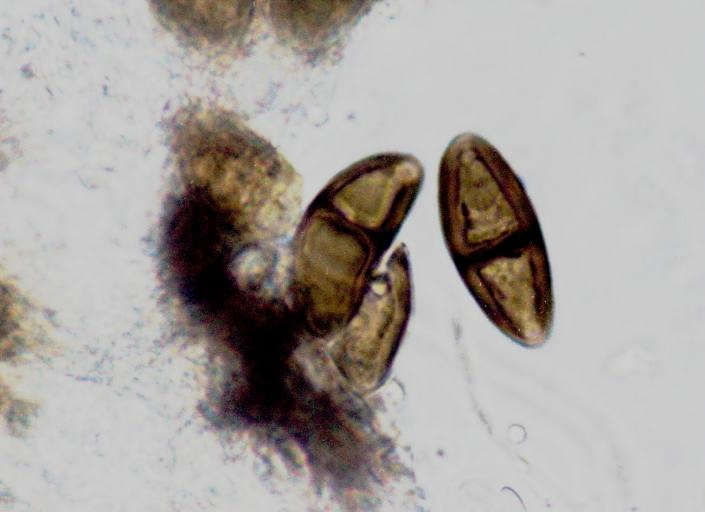
Photograph of brown, 1-septate (2-celled) spores from B. disciformis taken through a compound microscope, x1000. (spores measure 27 x 11 micrometres)
