= Lichen growth forms =

Gross morphological classification

The three main growth forms

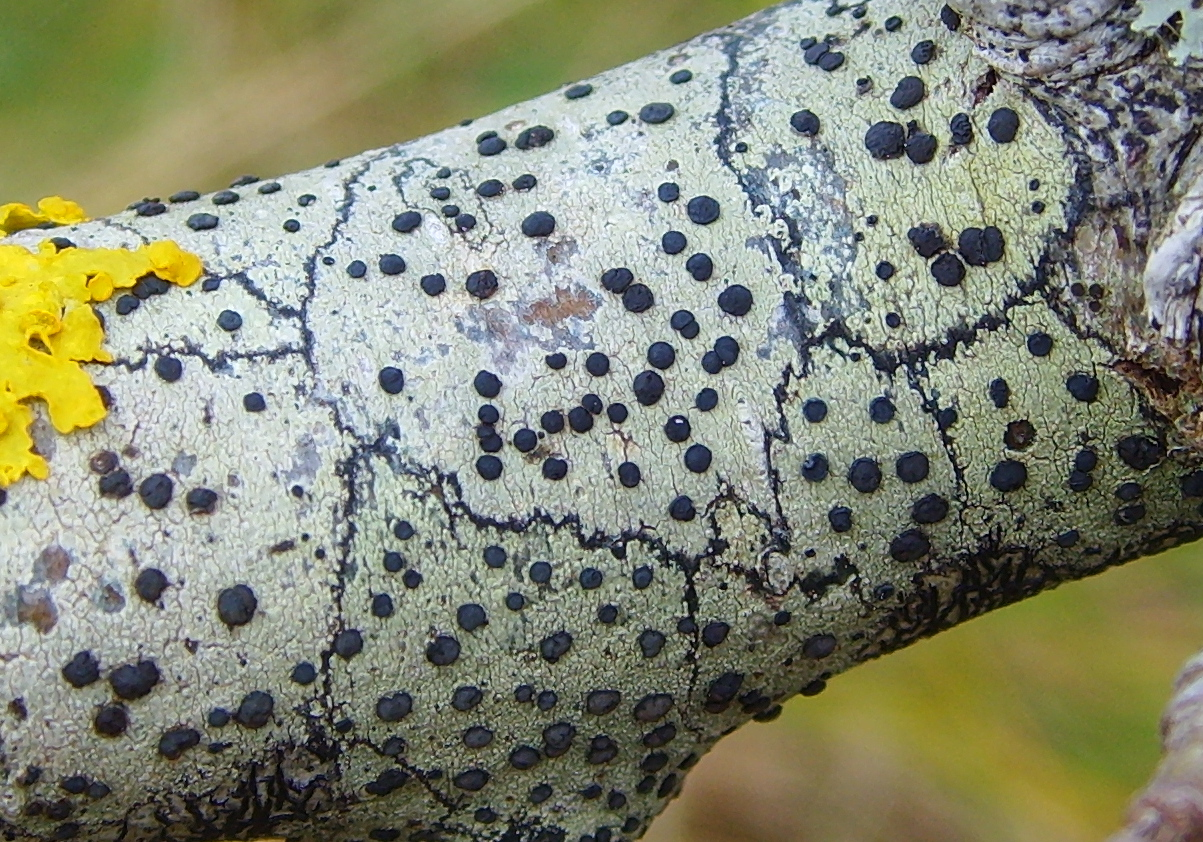
Crustose (Lecidella elaeochroma)

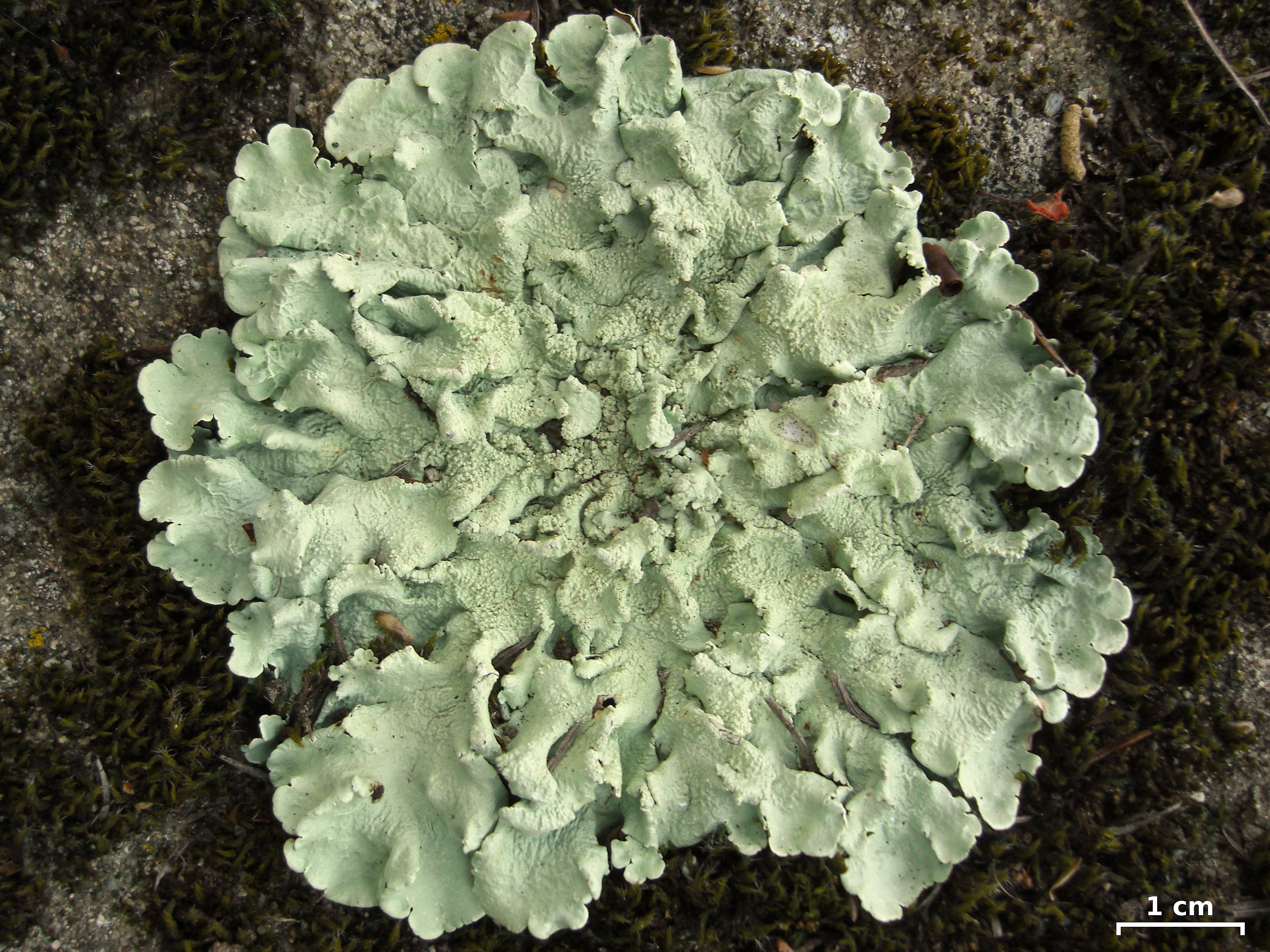
Foliose (Flavoparmelia caperata)

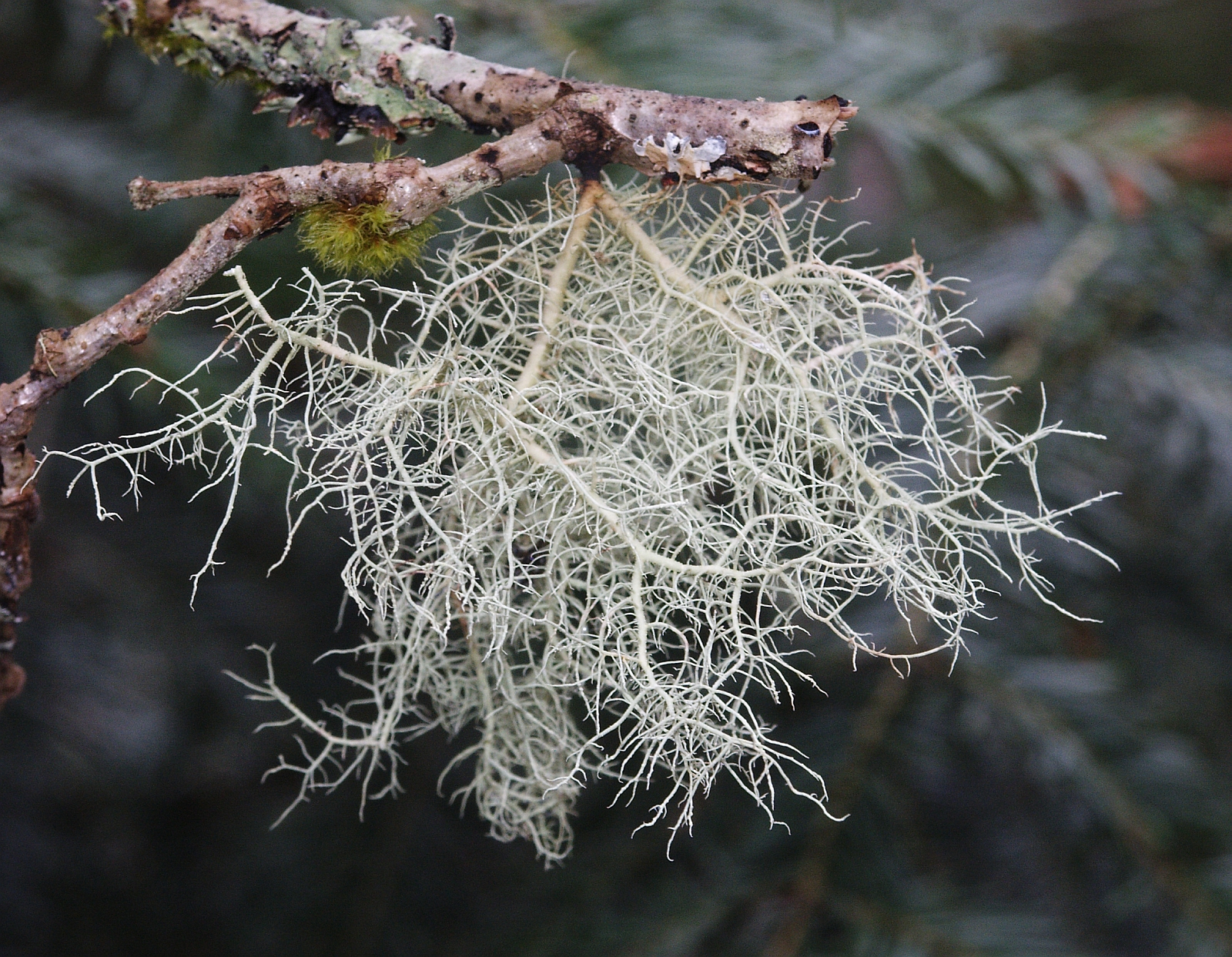
Fruticose (Usnea filipendula)

Lichens are symbiotic colonies composed of multiple species: a fungus, one or more photobionts (an alga and/or a cyanobacteria) and sometimes a yeast. They are regularly grouped by their external appearance – a characteristic known as their growth form. Based on the appearance of vegetative part of the lichen (its thallus), this form varies depending on the species and the environmental conditions it faces.

Those who study lichens (lichenologists) have described a dozen of these forms: areolate, byssoid, calicioid, cladoniform, crustose, filamentous, foliose, fruticose, gelatinous, leprose, placodioid and squamulose. Traditionally, crustose (flat), foliose (leafy) and fruticose (shrubby) are considered to be the three main forms. In addition to these more formalised, traditional growth types, there are a handful of informal types named for their resemblance to the lichens of specific genera. These include alectorioid, catapyrenioid, cetrarioid, hypogymnioid, parmelioid and usneoid.

== Context ==
Lichens are composite organisms made up of multiple species: a fungal partner, one or more photosynthetic partners (also known as photobionts), and sometimes a yeast. It is a symbiotic relationship, to which each partner contributes. In most cases, the fungal partner provides the structure in which the various partners live; this structure helps to protect the photobiont from environmental pressures. The photosynthetic partner(s) provide the nutrients which the various partners need to survive. The yeast (where present) appears to help ward off microbes and potential predators through the production of various chemicals. Thallus types have evolved to provide the lichen's photobiont with optimal levels of light, water, and carbon dioxide, with different environmental conditions favouring different forms.

== Growth forms ==
With the exception of calicioid lichens, lichen growth forms are based on the appearance of the thallus, which is the vegetative (non-reproductive) part of the lichen. In most species, this form is determined by the lichen's fungal partner, though in a small number, it is instead the alga or cyanobacteria (the lichen's photosynthetic partner) that determines the organism's overall shape. Growth form groupings are not always consistent with lichen taxonomy; lichens with similar growth forms are not necessarily related, and some of those which are related do not have similar growth forms. Not every species can be easily categorized. Some show characteristics of two growth forms, and different authors may place such species in different groups. In general, a particular species shows same overall growth form wherever it is found, but this is not always the case. Traditionally, crustose, foliose and fruticose are considered to be the three main forms.

=== Areolate ===
An areolate lichen is the most common form of crustose lichen. As with all crustose lichens, it has a paint-like appearance, and is inseparable from the substrate on which it grows. However, its thallus is broken into regular polygonal sections, which can look a bit like cracked mud, flaking paint or little islands. These sections, known as areolae, are surrounded by a thin layer of fungal hyphae called a hypothallus. This layer, which is usually dark, generally grows faster than the thallus which rides above it. This growth form is an adaptation which allows the lichen to cope with alternating periods of wet and dry. During wet periods, the lichen can absorb water, its tissues can swell, and the cracks close. The term "areolate" is derived from the Latin word areolatus, meaning "with areolae" (the plural of a diminutive form of area, meaning "halo" or "open space") combined with the Latin suffix -atus, meaning "provided with" or "likeness".

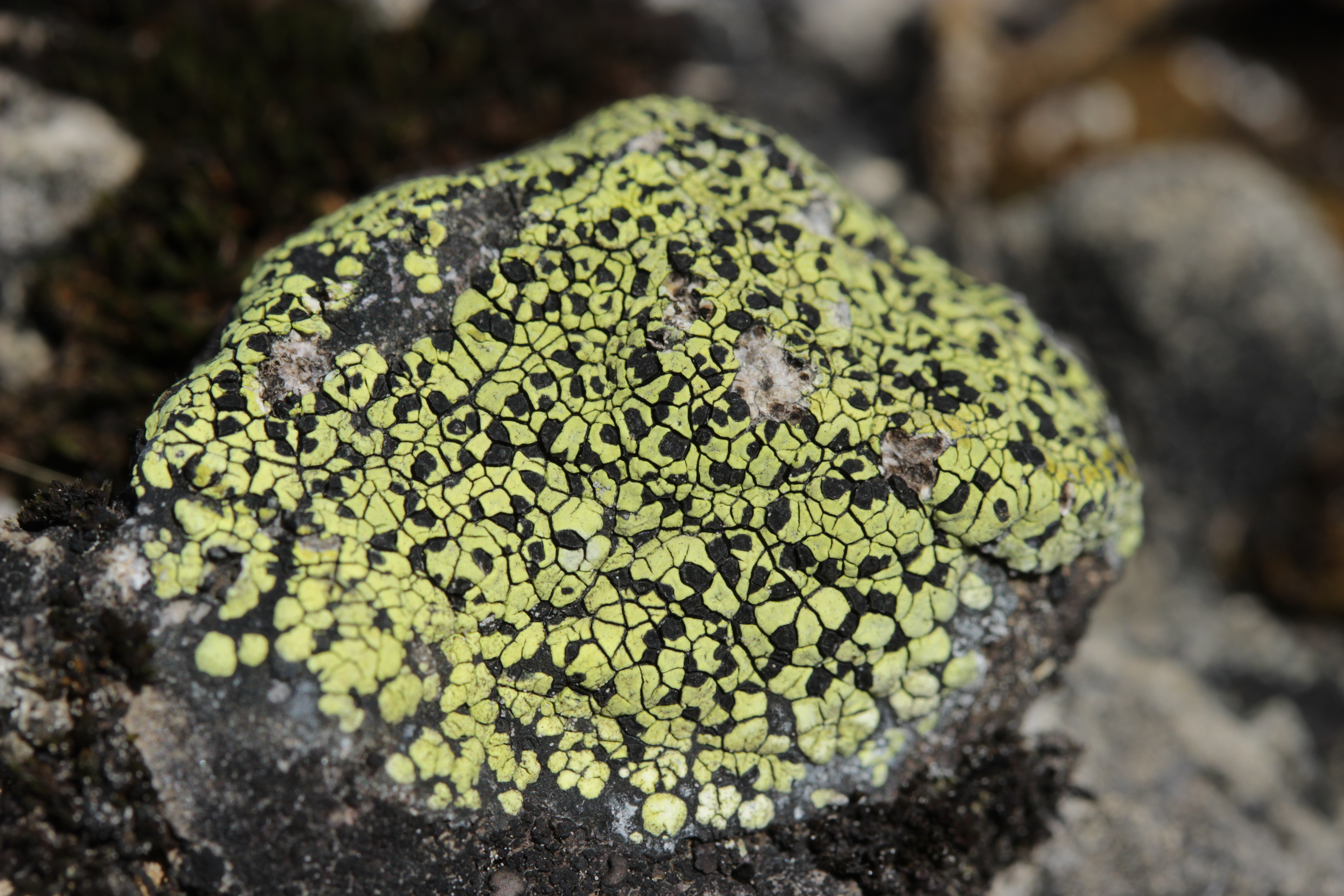
Rhizocarpon species

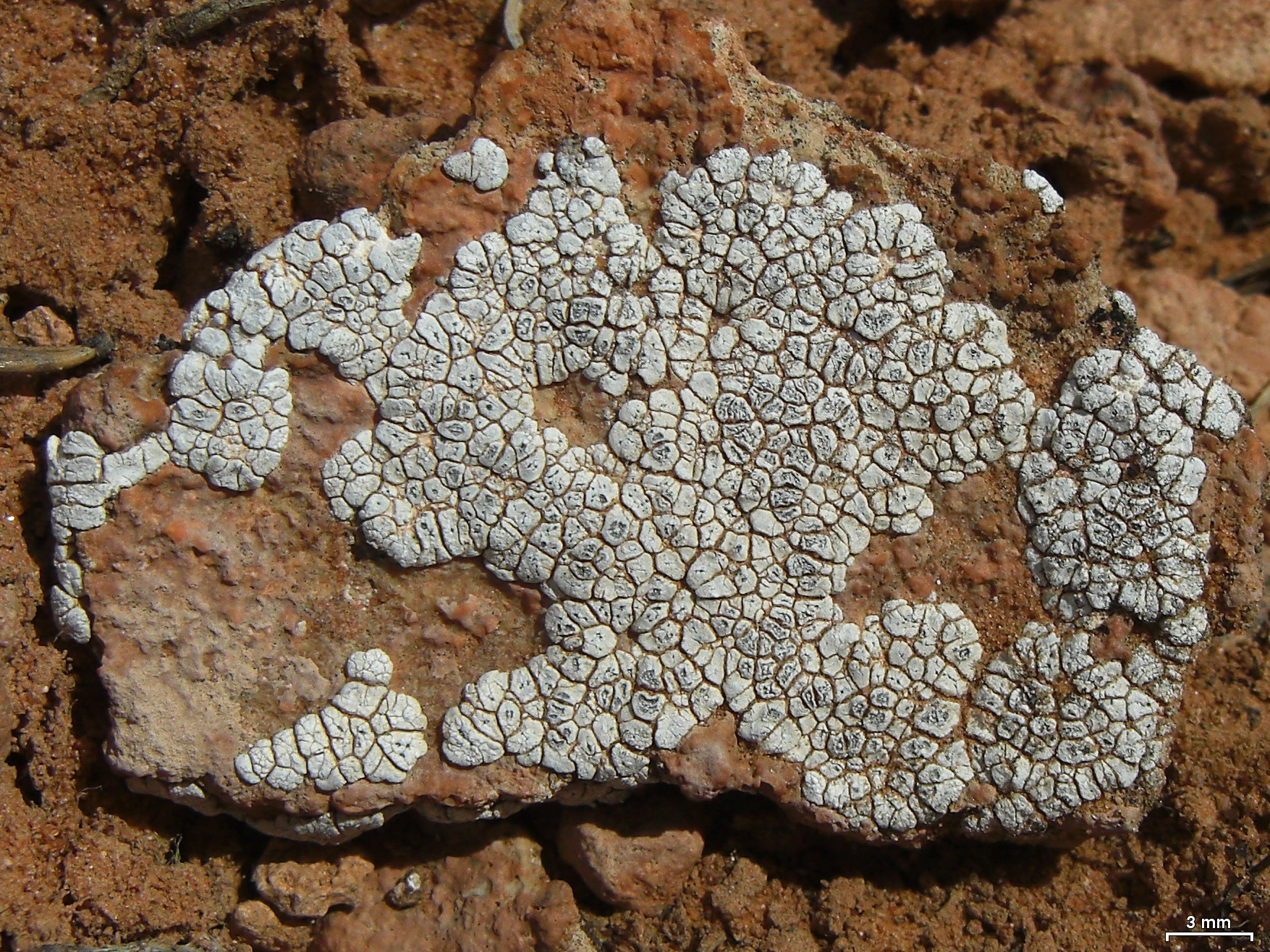
Acarospora strigata

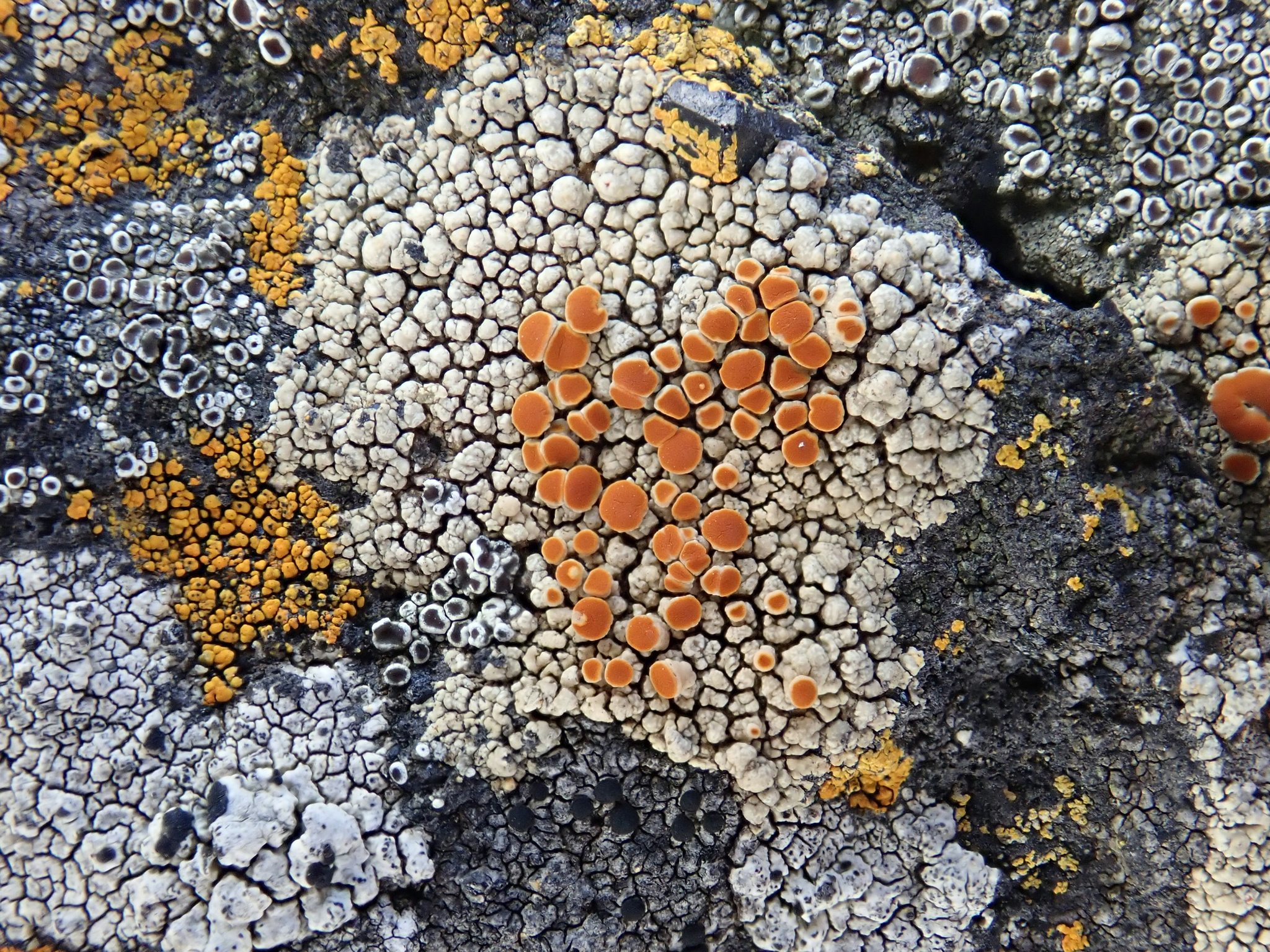
Sirenophila macquariensis

=== Byssoid ===
A byssoid lichen has a wispy, cottony or teased wool appearance due to the loosely woven hyphae in its thallus. It has no outer cortex. Lichens with this growth type can be split into two types. In one type, the thallus is dominated by fungal hyphae, with a photobiont – typically a coccoid green alga – sprinkled throughout. In the other, the thallus is dominated by photobiont filaments which have a thin fungal coating. Byssoid lichens are not particularly common, but they occur across a range of orders and families. Though they are found in a variety of habitats, they appear to be most common in rainforests. Byssoid lichens typically grow in areas of high humidity, on surfaces where they have no direct contact with rainfall or running water – areas such as cactus spines in fog oases or the underside of branches in rainforests. Their loose thallus structure and lack of a cortex may allow them to absorb water vapor directly from the air. Some lichenologists consider byssoid lichens to be a specialised type of fruticose lichen. The term "byssoid" is derived from the Ancient Greek: βύσσος : býssos, a word for "linen cloth of very fine threads" (via the Latin byssus) in combination with the Latin suffix -aceus (via the English -aceous), meaning "of or pertaining to" or "with the nature of".

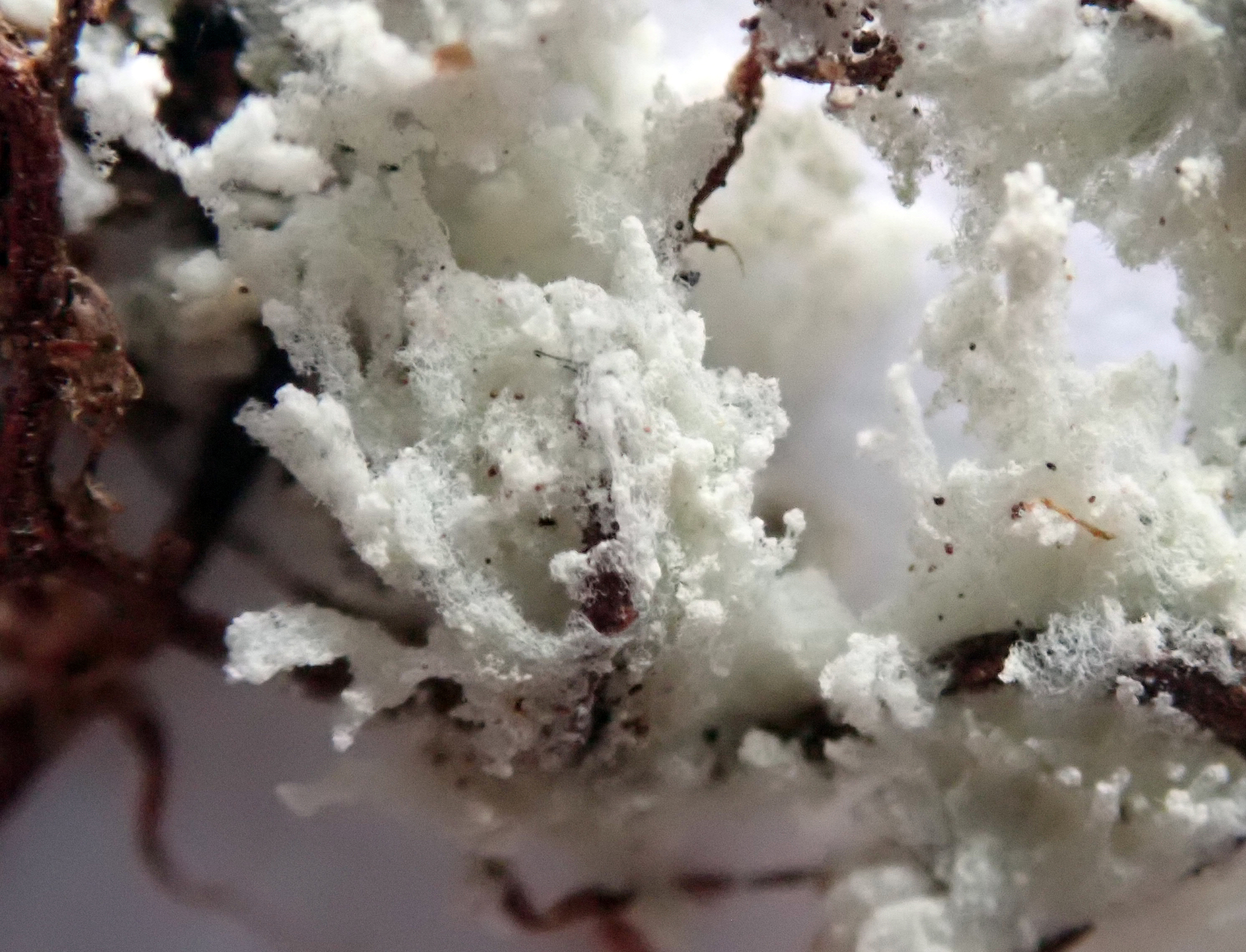
Roccellinastrum neglectum

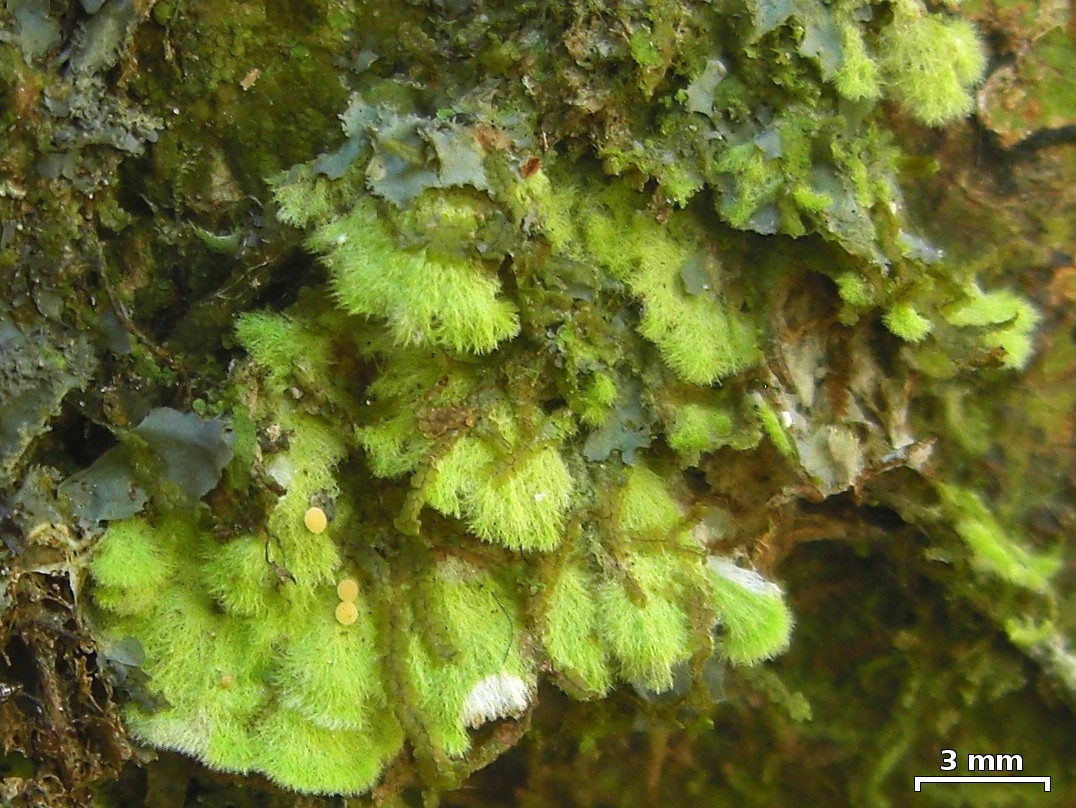
Coenogonium species

=== Calicioid ===
Unlike the other growth forms detailed here, a calicioid lichen is distinguished by its fruiting bodies rather than its thallus. Members of the order Caliciales (which gives the form its name), they are commonly known as "stubble lichens" or "pin lichens". In these lichens, mature spores build up in a thick layer on the surface of the fruiting bodies. This layer, called a mazaedium, is typically brown or black, and spores are dispersed passively from it. Most calicioid lichens are crustose with tiny stalked fruiting bodies. However, because the fundamental characteristic of a calicioid lichen is the presence of a mazaedium rather than a stalked fruiting body, a handful of fruticose lichens also fall into this category. Calicioid lichens are generally restricted to old-growth forest, and can be used as indicators of the age and quality of such ecosystems.

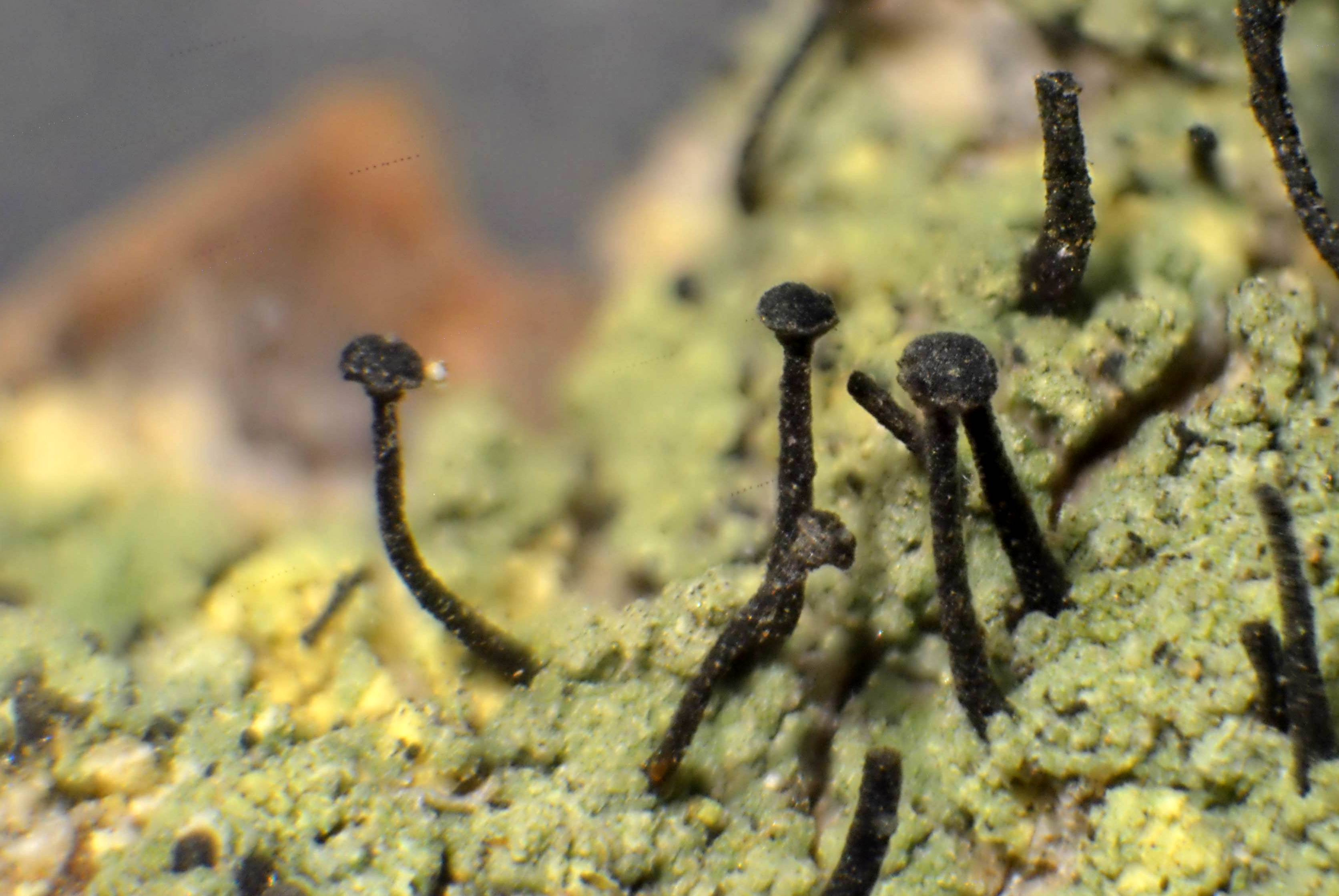
Calicium viride

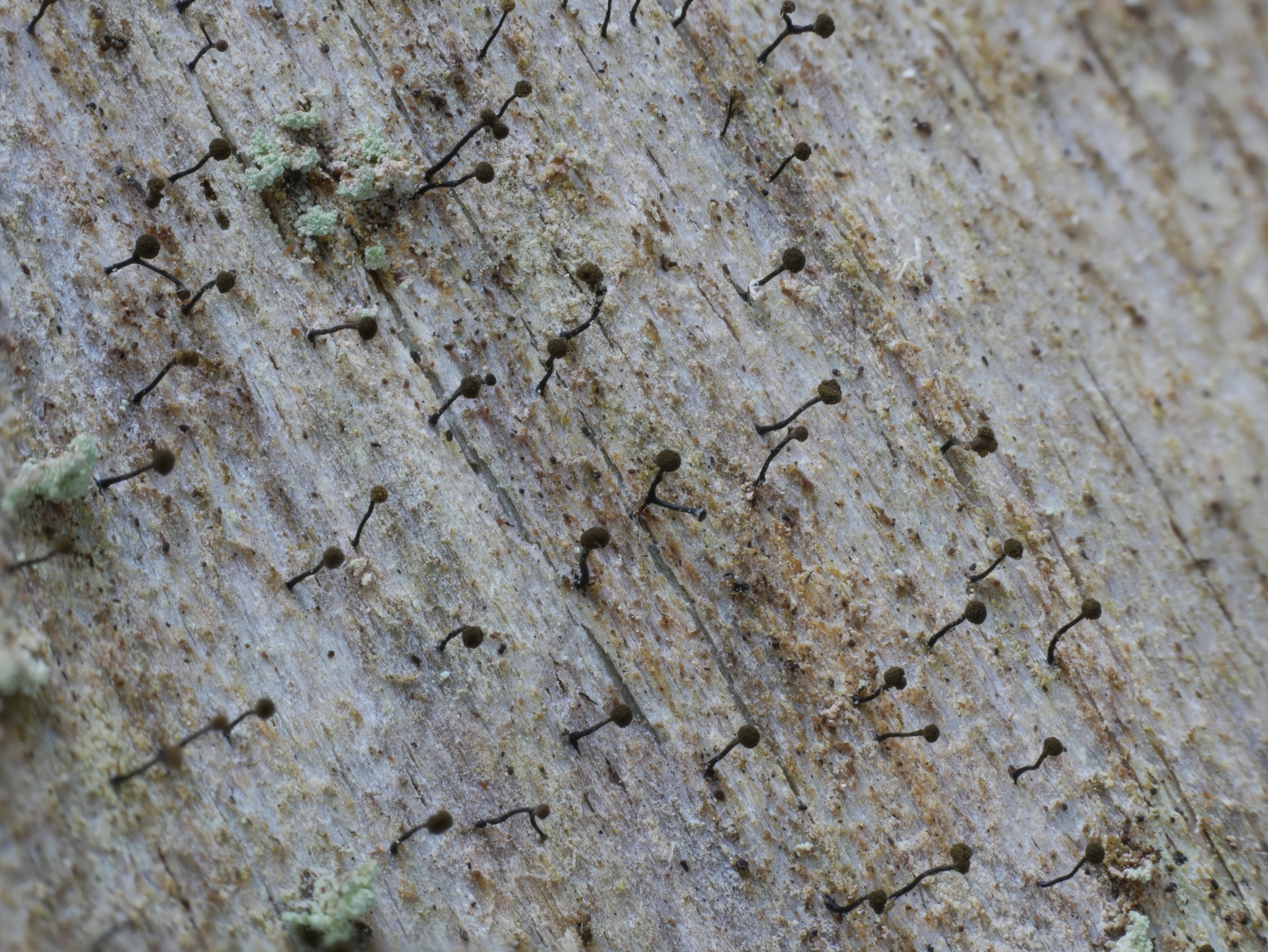
Chaenotheca brunneola

=== Cladoniform ===
A cladoniform lichen is one with a dimorphic thallus. The form is named for the genus Cladonia, as most lichens in this genus show a combination of two growth types: squamulose and fruticose. The primary thallus is composed of small, overlapping scales, while the secondary thallus (which supports the lichen's fruiting structures) is fruticose in appearance. These secondary thalli, which are known as podetia, can be branched, spike-like or cup-shaped. Lichens with this growth form are found in the families Cladoniaceae and Baeomycetaceae.

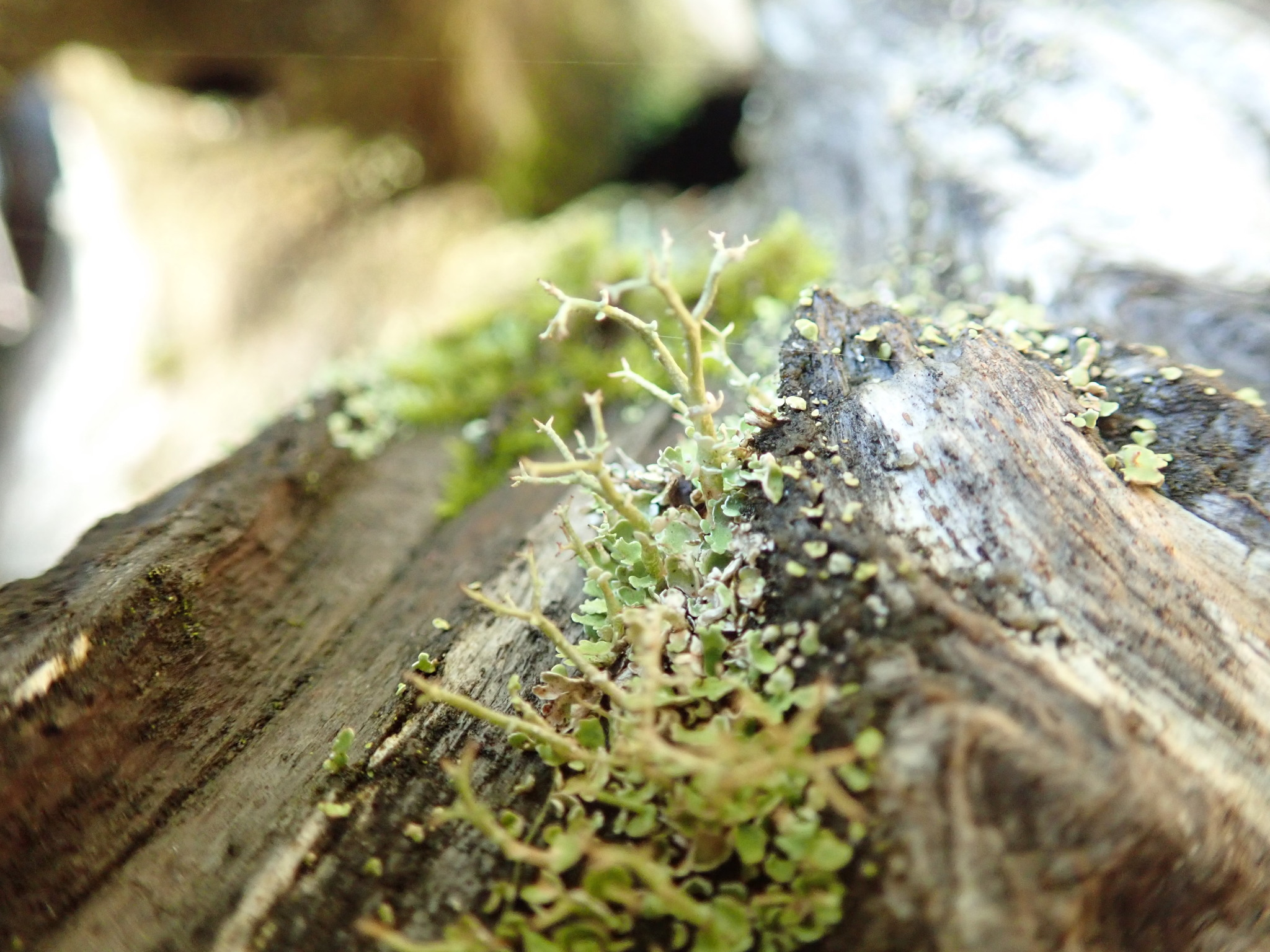
Cladonia furcata, with branched podetia

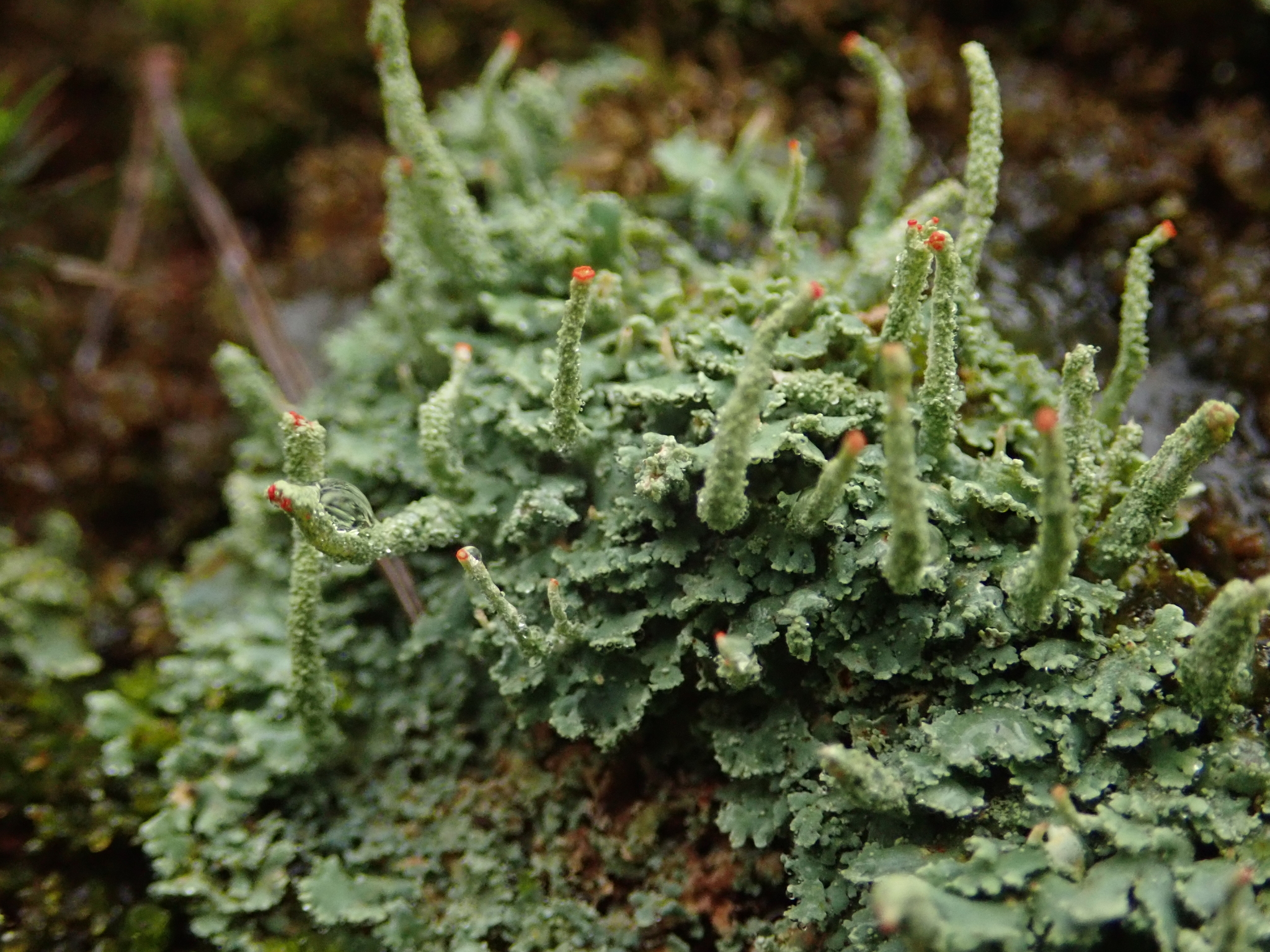
Cladonia macilenta, with spike-like podetia

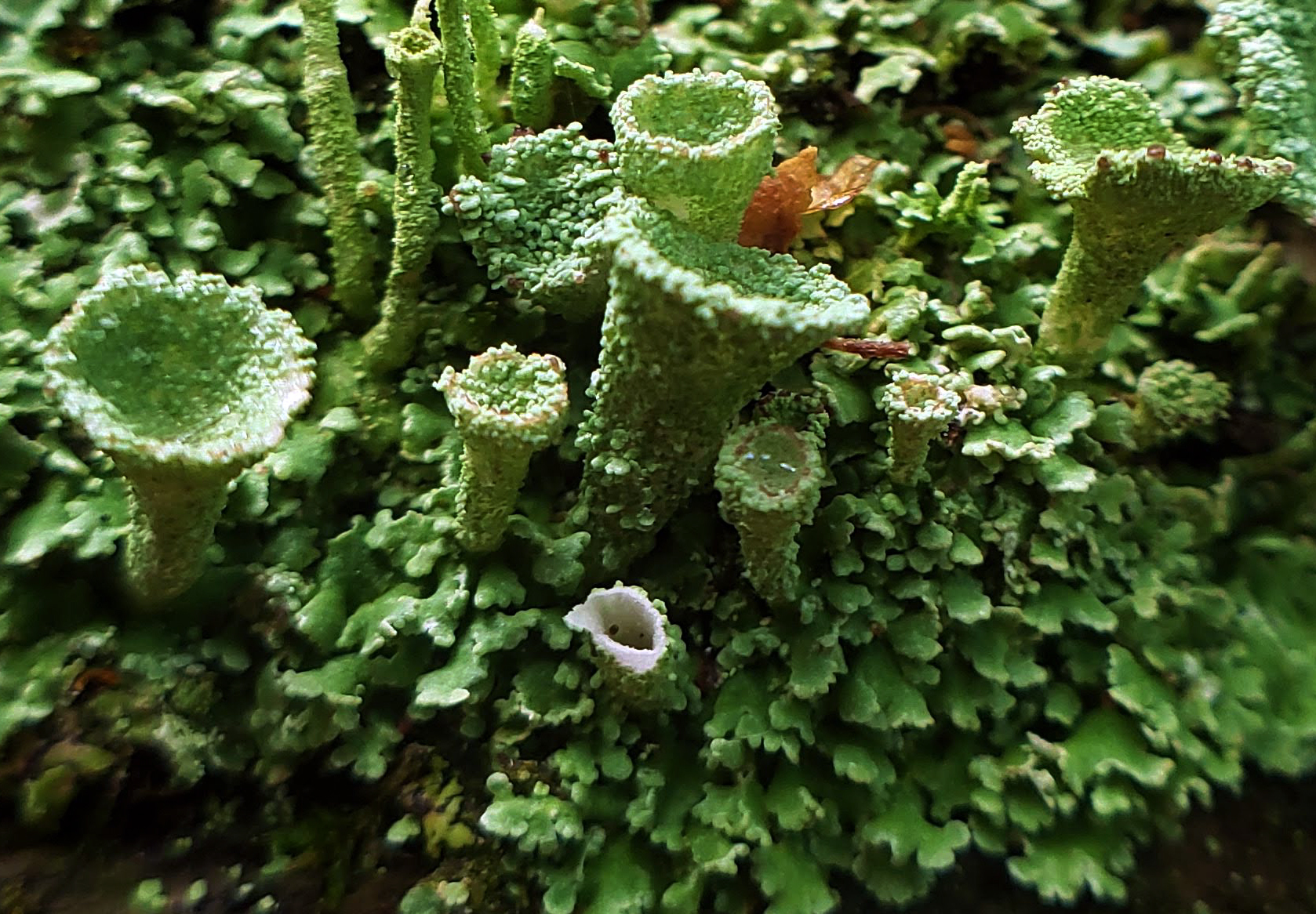
Cladonia pyxidata, with cup-shaped podetia

=== Crustose ===
A crustose lichen, as its name suggests, is crust-like and two-dimensional, closely and completely bound at nearly all points to the substrate on which it grows. It typically cannot be removed from the substrate without at least partial destruction of one or the other. Some crustose lichens are thick and lumpy, others thin and smooth, and some are almost completely submerged into the substrate with only apothecia emerging to the surface. Crustose lichens lack a lower cortex, though most have an upper cortex. The photobiont layer lies just below the upper cortex. Many crustose lichens have a ring of unlichenised fungal hyphae at their edges. This fringe, known as a prothallus, may be black, white or the same colour as the rest of the thallus. The term "crustose" derives from the Latin crustosus, meaning "crusted".

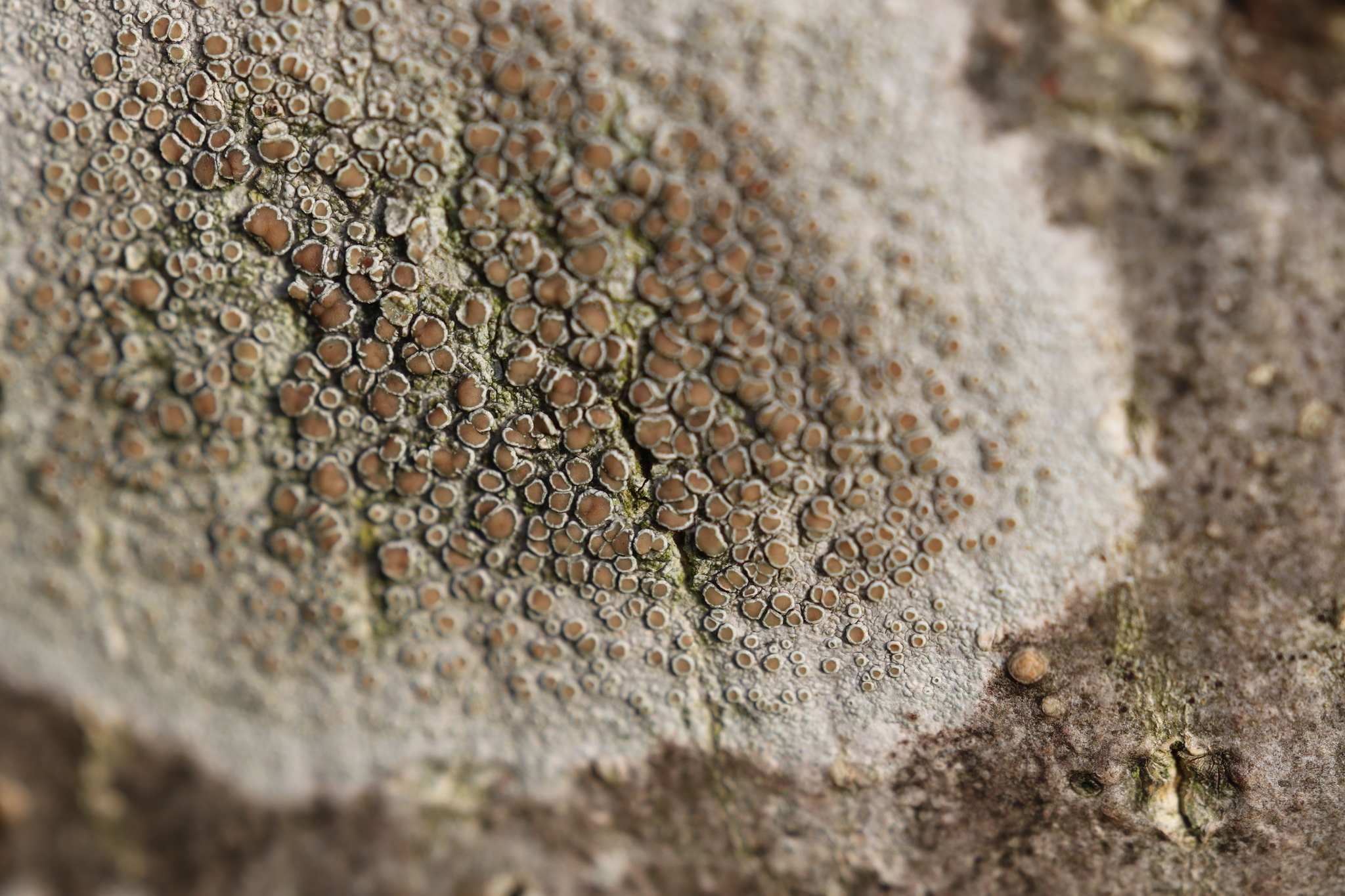
Lecanora chlarotera, which has no prothallus

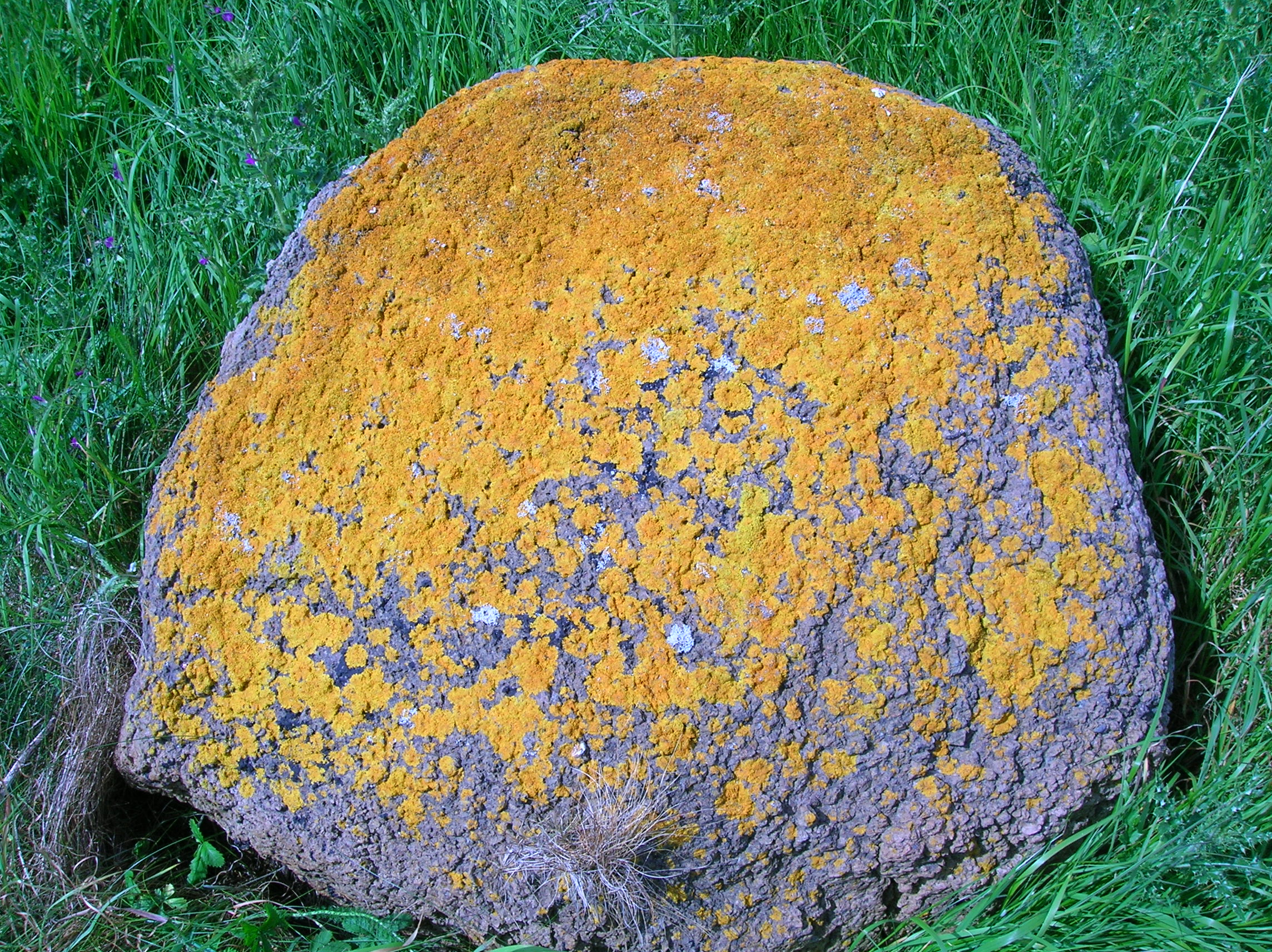
Caloplaca marina

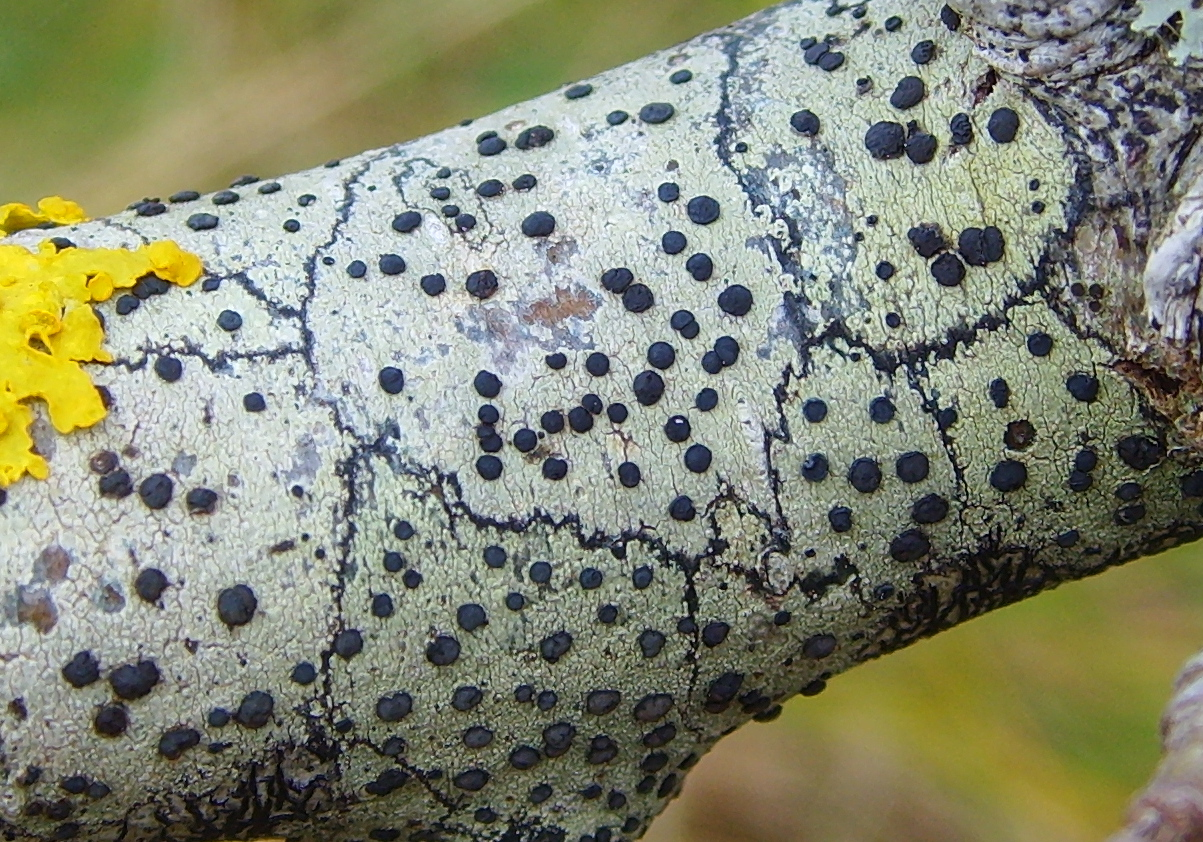
Lecidella elaeochroma, showing a narrow black prothallus at the edges

=== Filamentous ===
Unlike most of the other forms detailed here (the exception being some byssoid lichens), a filamentous lichen's morphology is determined by its algal partner rather than its fungal partner. A thin layer of fungal hyphae surrounds an algal chain, resulting in a thread-like or hair-like structure. Because of their high surface to mass ratio they can quickly absorb moisture, enabling them to take advantage of even short periods of high humidity (such as fog or dew). They are often epiphytic, growing on trees in forested areas, but are also common in some alpine zones. Lichenologists tend to consider filamentous lichens to be a type of fruticose lichen. This is an uncommon growth form, found in only a handful of genera. The term "filamentous" is derived from the Latin filamentum, meaning "filament", itself derived from the Latin filare, meaning "to spin", from filum, meaning "thread".

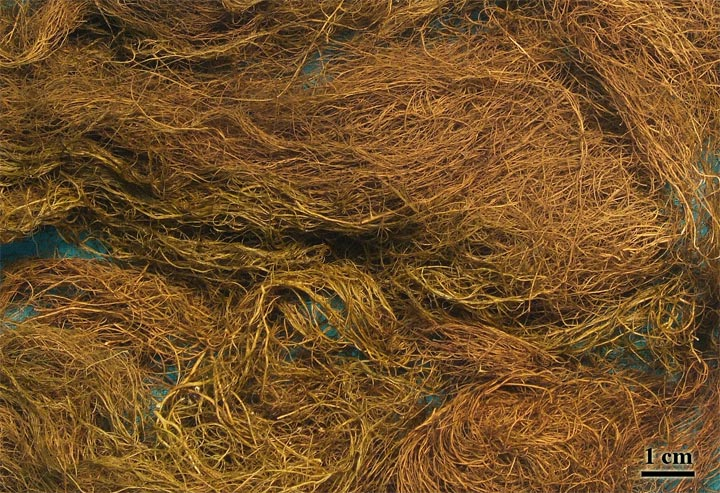
Bryoria fremontii

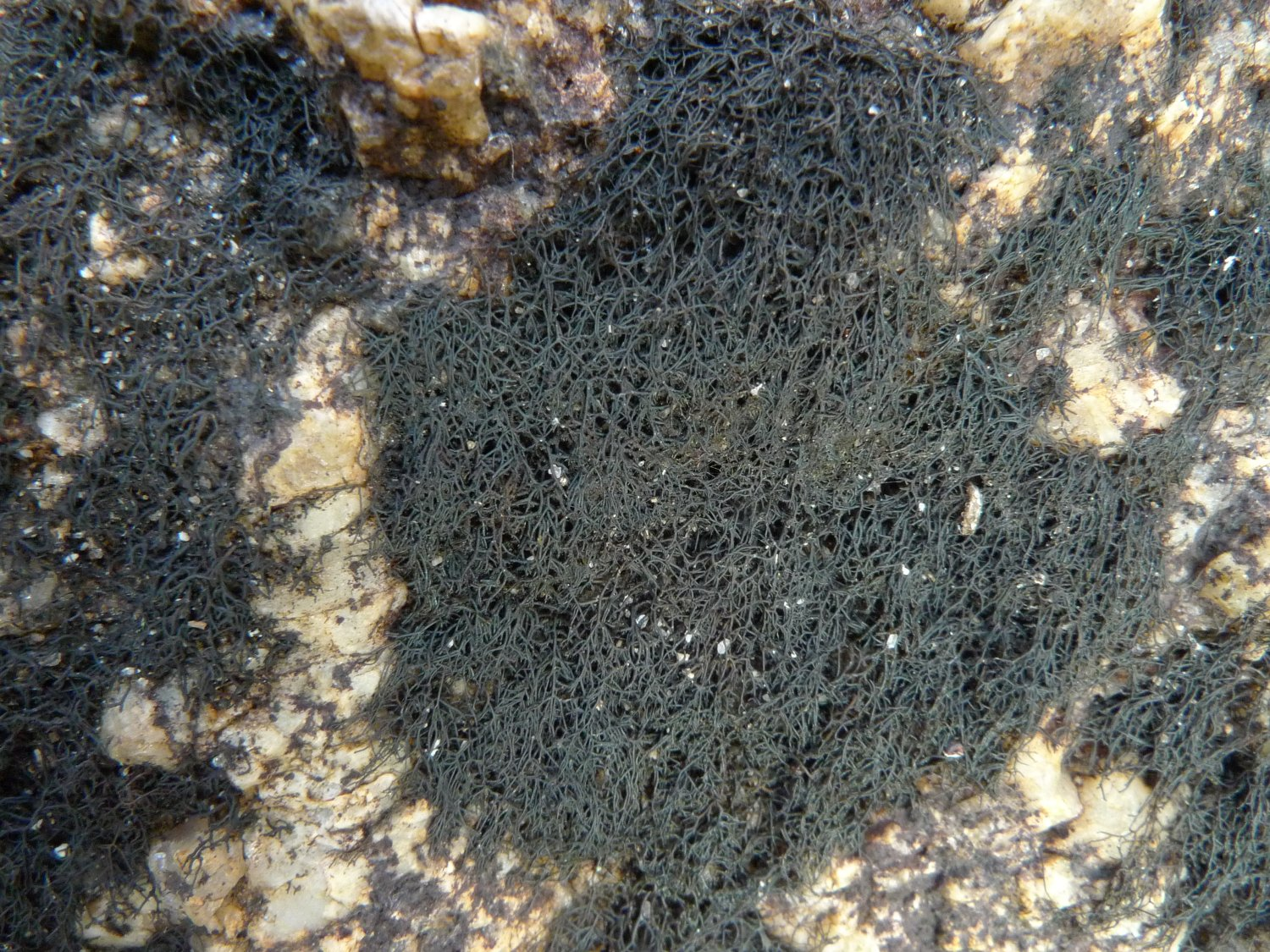
Ephebe lanata

=== Foliose ===
A foliose lichen has flat, leaf-like lobes that are generally not firmly bonded to the substrate on which it grows. It typically has distinct upper and lower surfaces, each of which is typically covered with a cortex; some, however, lack a lower cortex. The photobiont layer lies just below the upper cortex. Where present, the lower cortex is usually dark (sometimes even black), but occasionally white. Foliose lichens are attached to their substrate either by hyphae extending from the cortex or medulla, or by root-like structures called rhizines. The latter, which are found only in foliose lichens, come in a variety of shapes, the specifics of which can aid in species identification. Some foliose lichens attach only at a single stout peg called a holdfast, typically located near the lichen's centre. Lichens with this structure are called "umbilicate". In general, medium to large epiphytic foliose lichens are moderately sensitive to air pollution, while smaller or ground-dwelling foliose lichens are more tolerant. The term "foliose" derives from the Latin word foliosus, meaning "leafy".

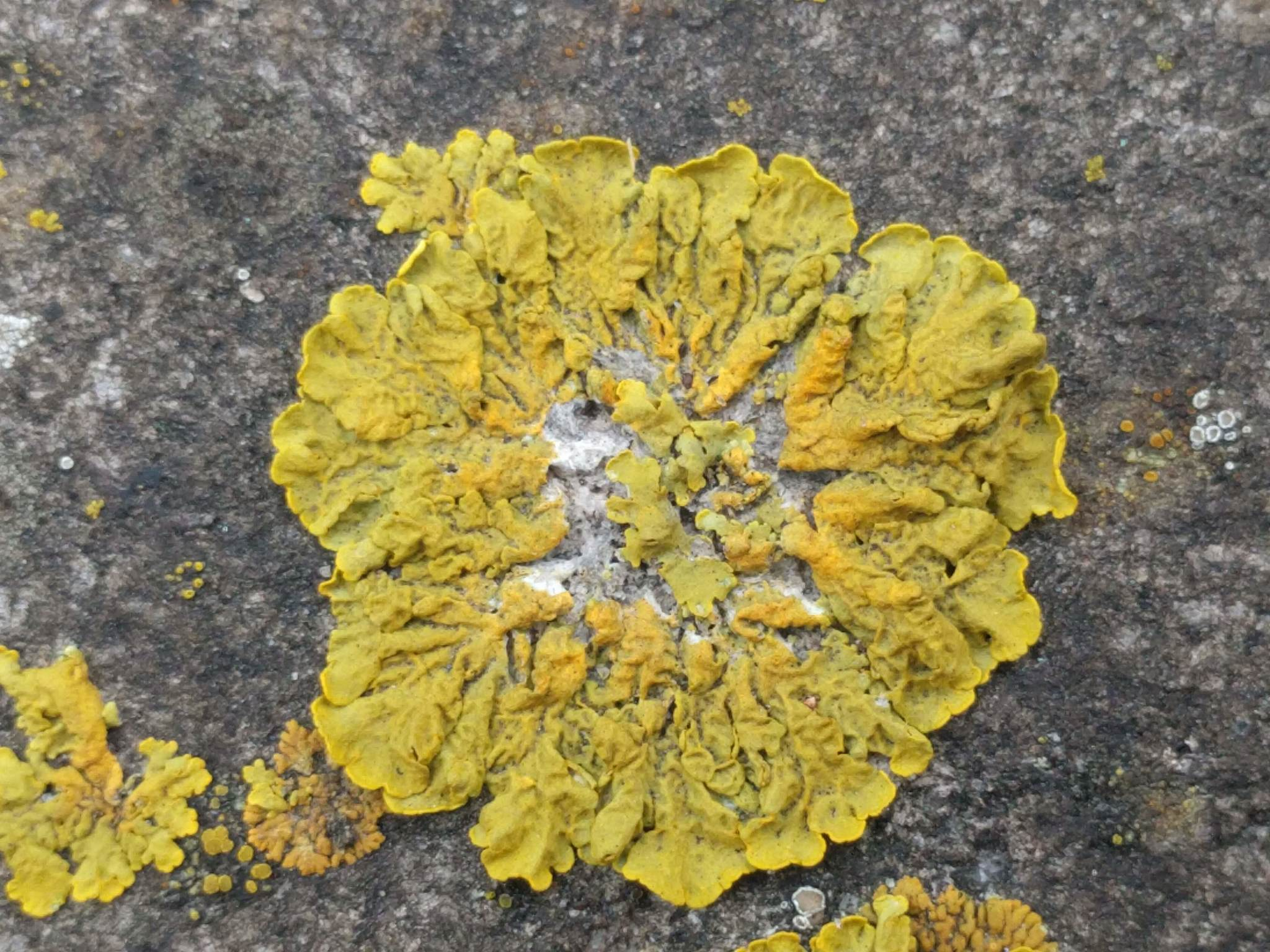
Xanthoria parietina

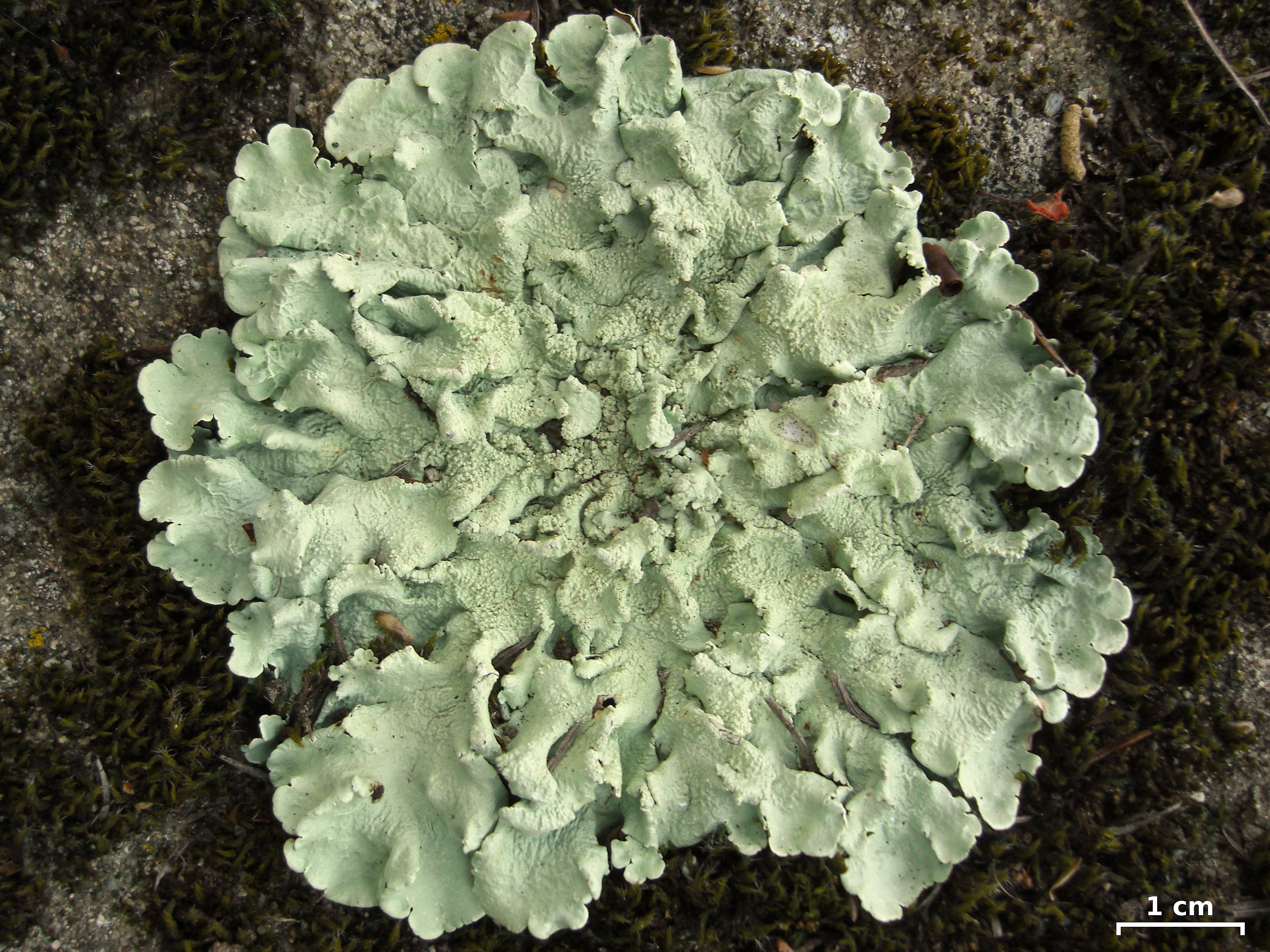
Flavoparmelia caperata

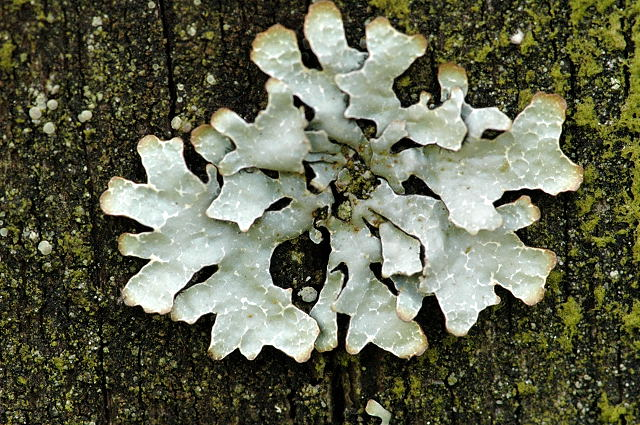
Parmelia sulcata

=== Fruticose ===
A fruticose lichen is typically shrubby or coral-like in appearance, though some are hair-like or strap-like instead. Some grow upright while others hang. They attach to the substrate only at a single point at their base (or at most a very few points), and can be easily removed. Sometimes, as in the case of vagrant lichens, they are completely unattached to a substrate. Unlike a foliose lichen, a fruticose lichen does not have a distinct upper and lower surface. Instead, a cortex covers its entire surface, and the photobiont layer lies just below this, on all sides of the lichen's branches. The centre of a fruticose lichen's branches varies depending on the genus involved. In most, the centre is hollow. However, lichens in the genus Usnea have a fairly elastic cord running through the middle. This is the most three-dimensional of the lichen growth forms, and the most sensitive to air pollution. The term "fruticose" is derived from the Latin word fruticosus, meaning "shrubby" or "similar to a shrub" (from frutex, meaning "shrub").

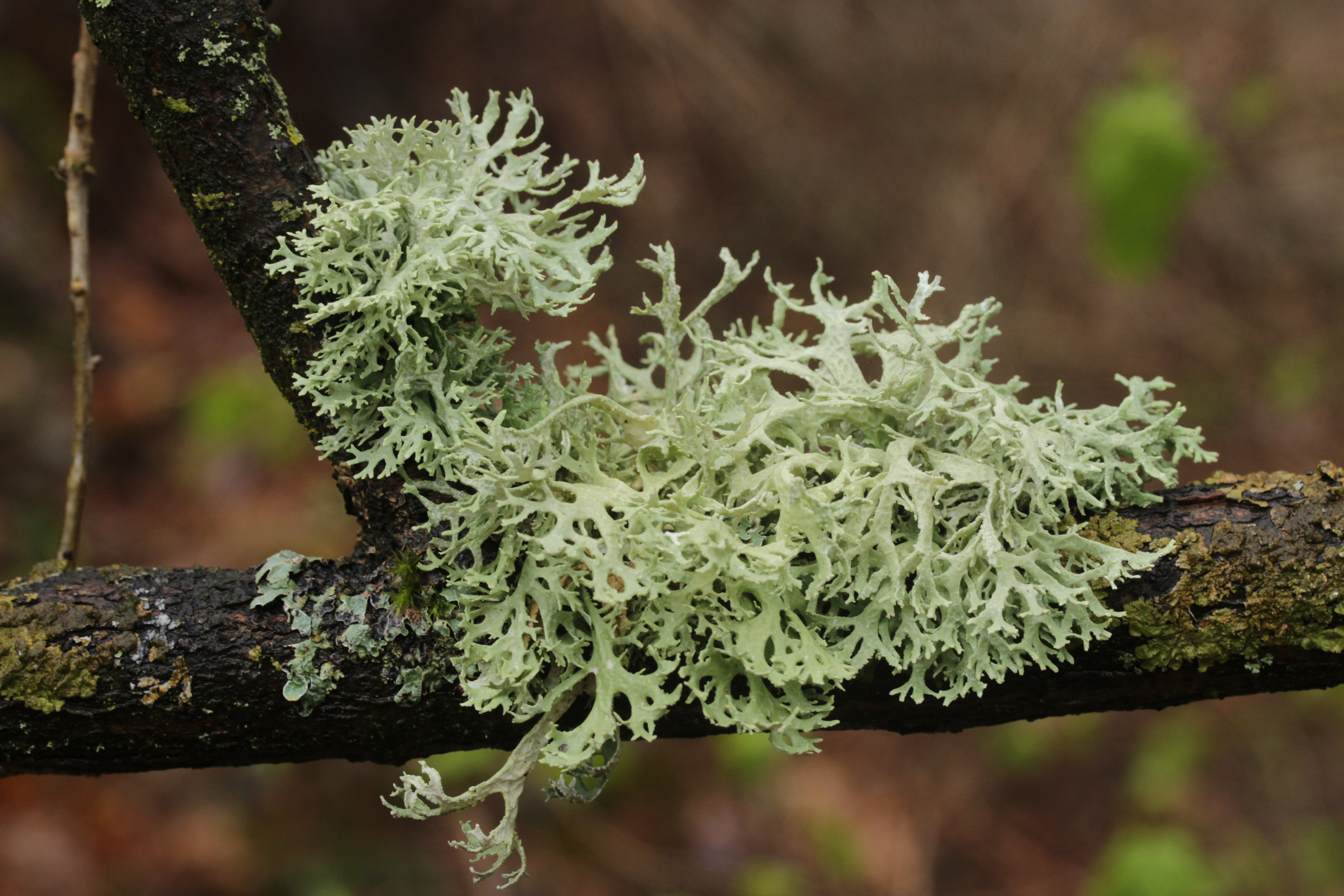
Evernia prunastri

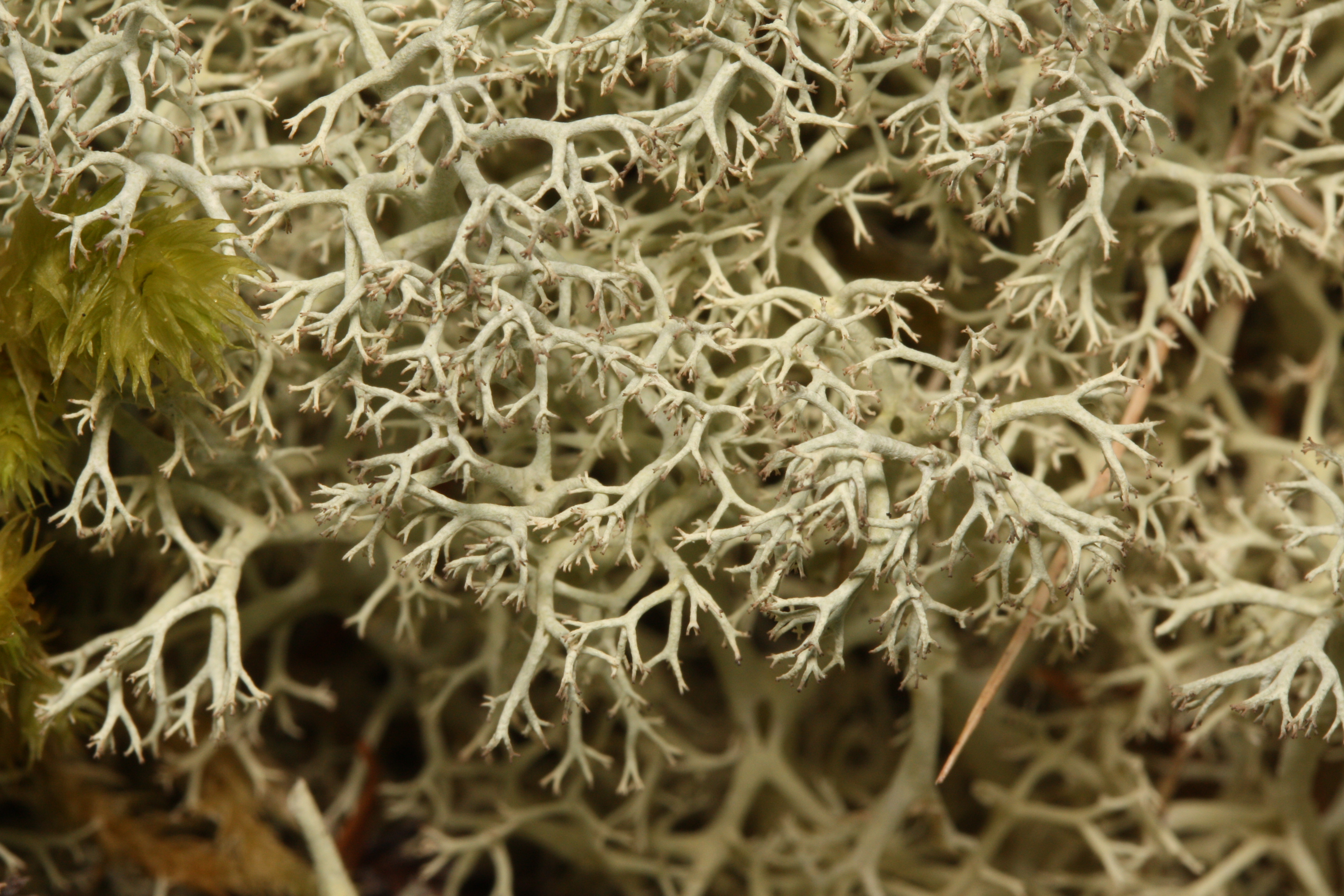
Cladonia portentosa

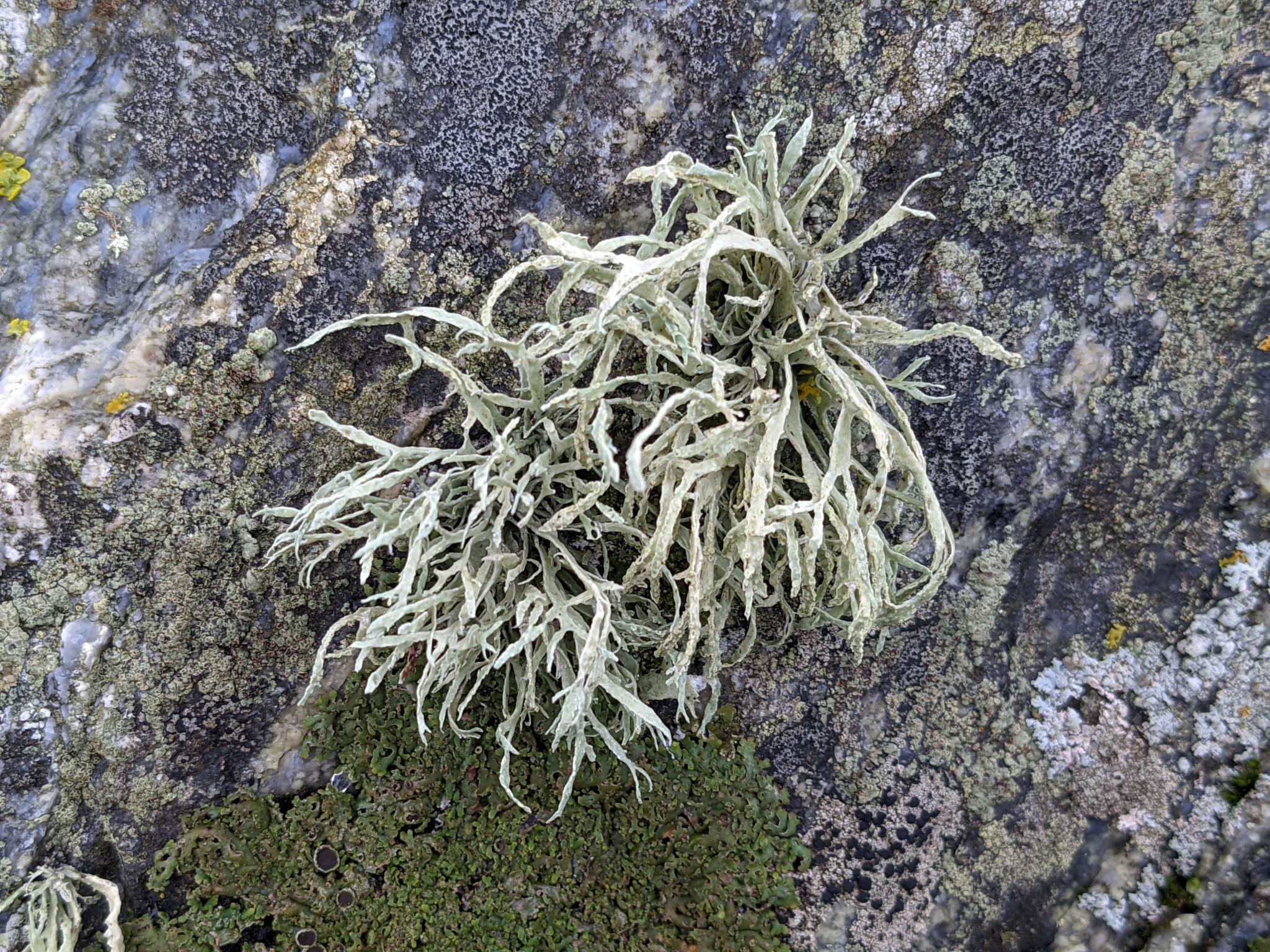
Ramalina farinacea

=== Gelatinous ===
A gelatinous lichen, also widely known as a "jelly lichen", is one with a cyanobacterial species ("blue-green alga") as the principal photobiont. Chains of the photobiont, rather than fungal hyphae, make up the bulk of the thallus, which is unlayered (and undifferentiated) as a result. Such lichens lack a cortex. Despite this lack of internal structure, gelatinous lichens usually have external growth forms that resemble those of fungal-dominated lichens. Gelatinous lichens are particularly common in areas with erratic rainfall or periodic inundation (such as rock pools). The presence of Nostoc cyanobacteria allows the lichen to absorb significant amounts of moisture, swelling in the process. It can then remain sufficiently hydrated to allow photosynthesis long after the wetting event is over. The term "gelatinous" means "resembling gelatin or jelly".

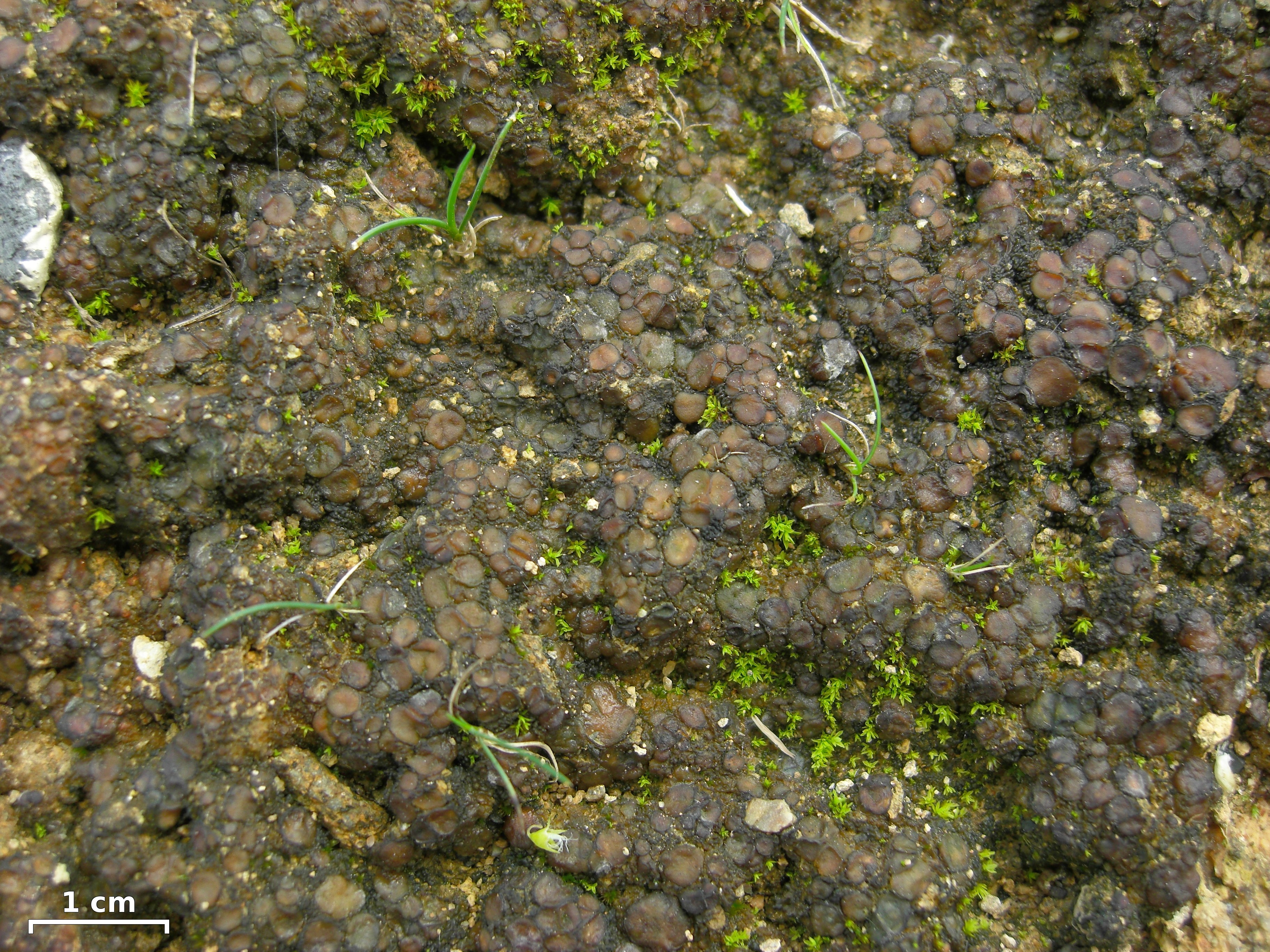
Collema bachmanianum

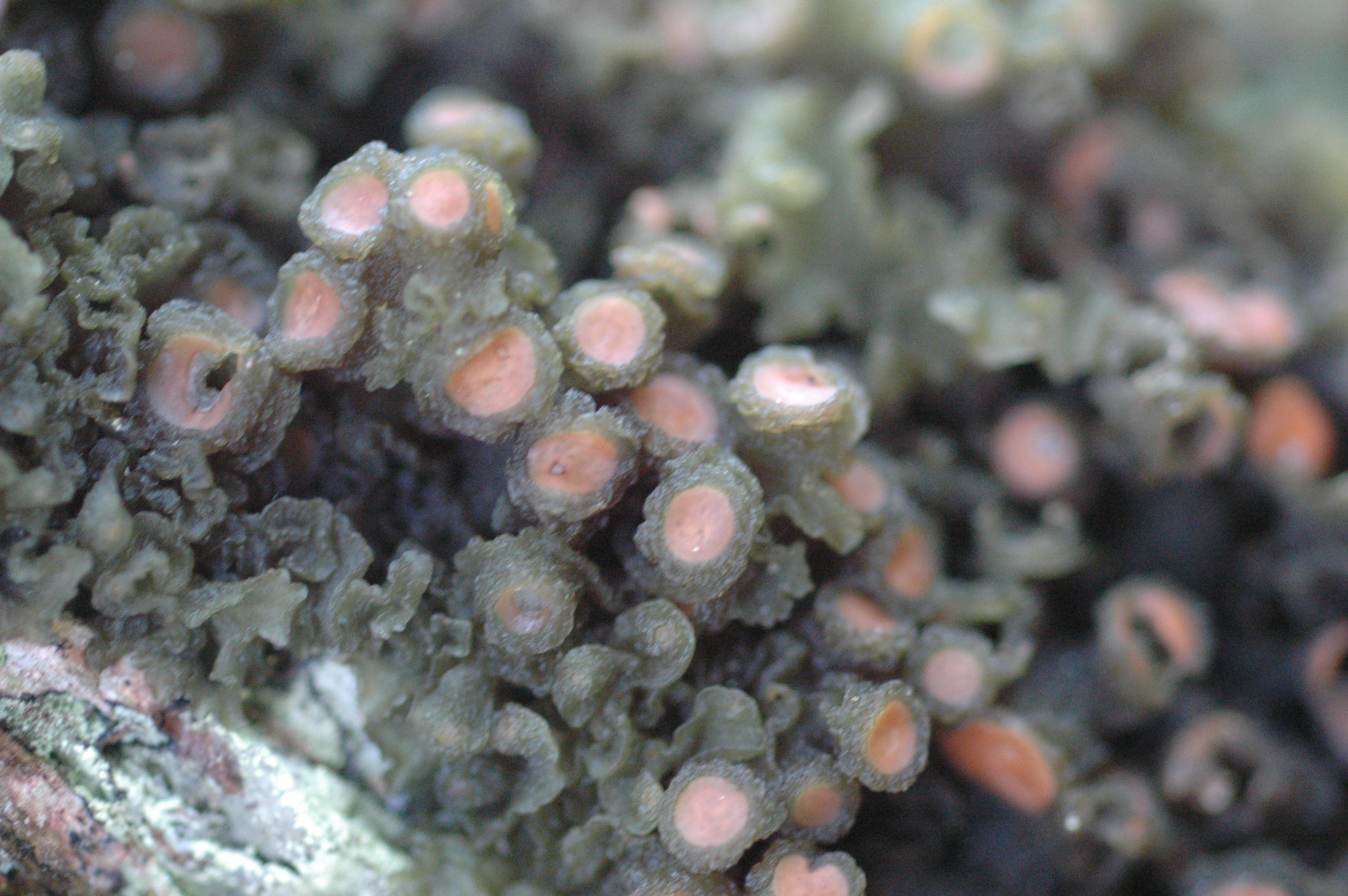
Leptogium phyllocarpum

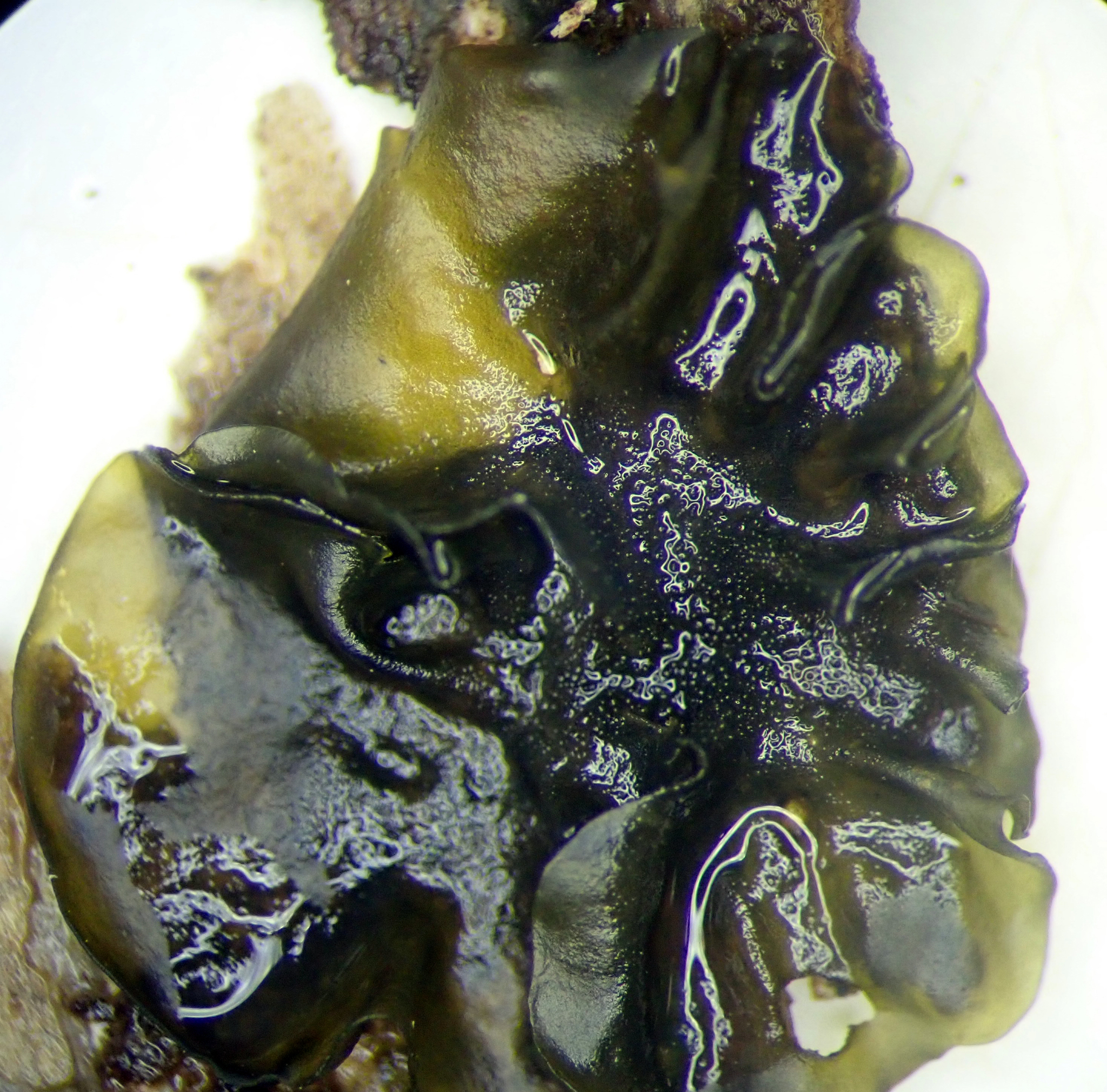
Collema subflaccidum

=== Leprose ===
A leprose lichen, which is typically considered to be a form of crustose lichen, is one with a powdery or dust-like appearance. Its undifferentiated thallus is an irregular mix of fungal hyphae and scattered photobiont cells, lacking a cortex or any definable layers. Morphologically, it is the simplest growth form. The cell walls of leprose lichens contain chemical compounds which make them hydrophobic, and thus largely water repellent. However, the lack of a cortex allows them to absorb water directly from humid air. Leprose lichens often grow in damp, shaded places generally untouched by rain. They can be completely covered in soredia – small aggregates of fungal hyphae and photobiont cells which can break off to form new lichen colonies. They have never been found with fruiting bodies. The term "leprose" derives from the Latin leprosus, meaning "scurfy" or "scaly" (from the Greek lepras, meaning "leprosy").

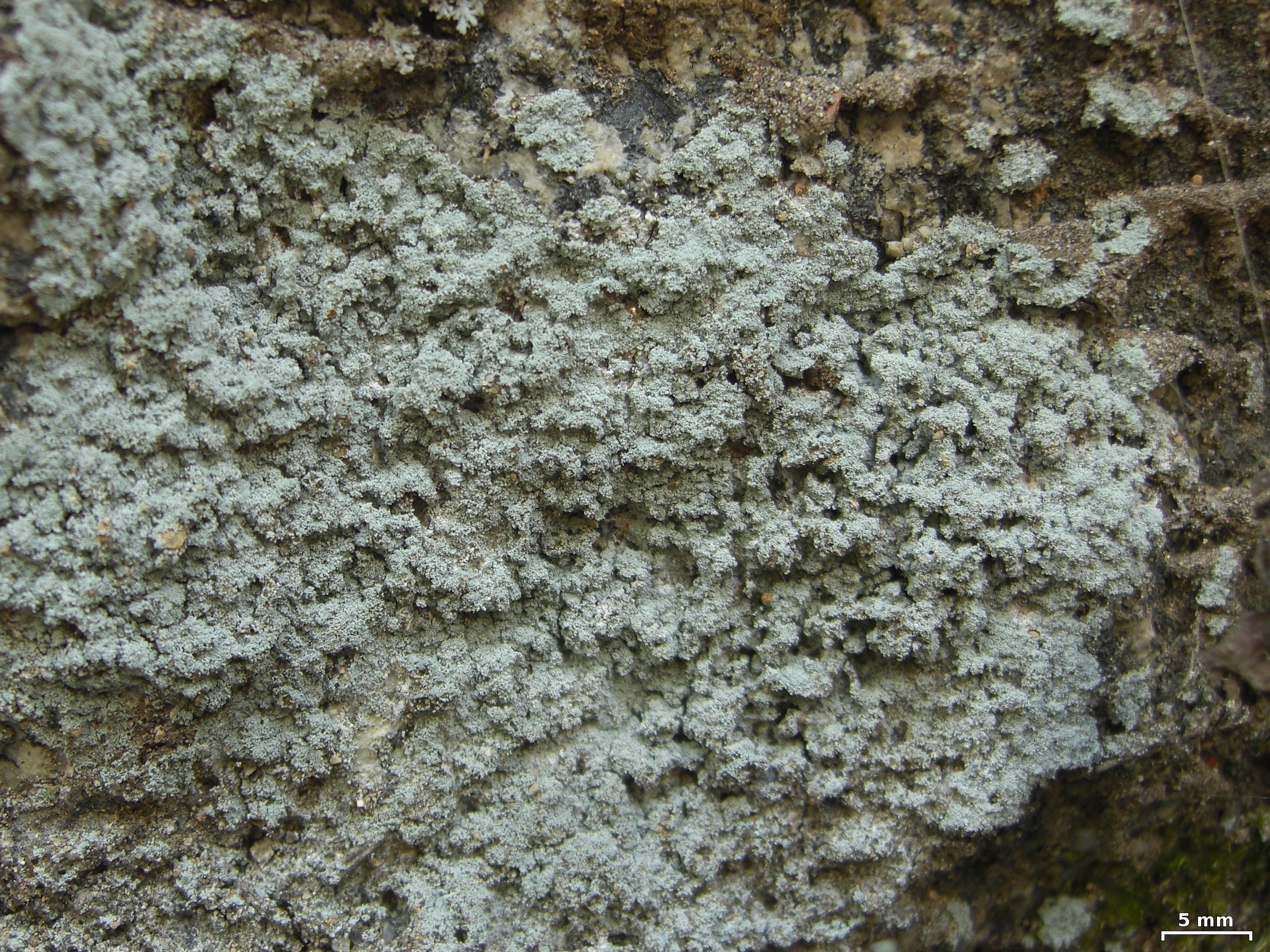
Lepraria neglecta

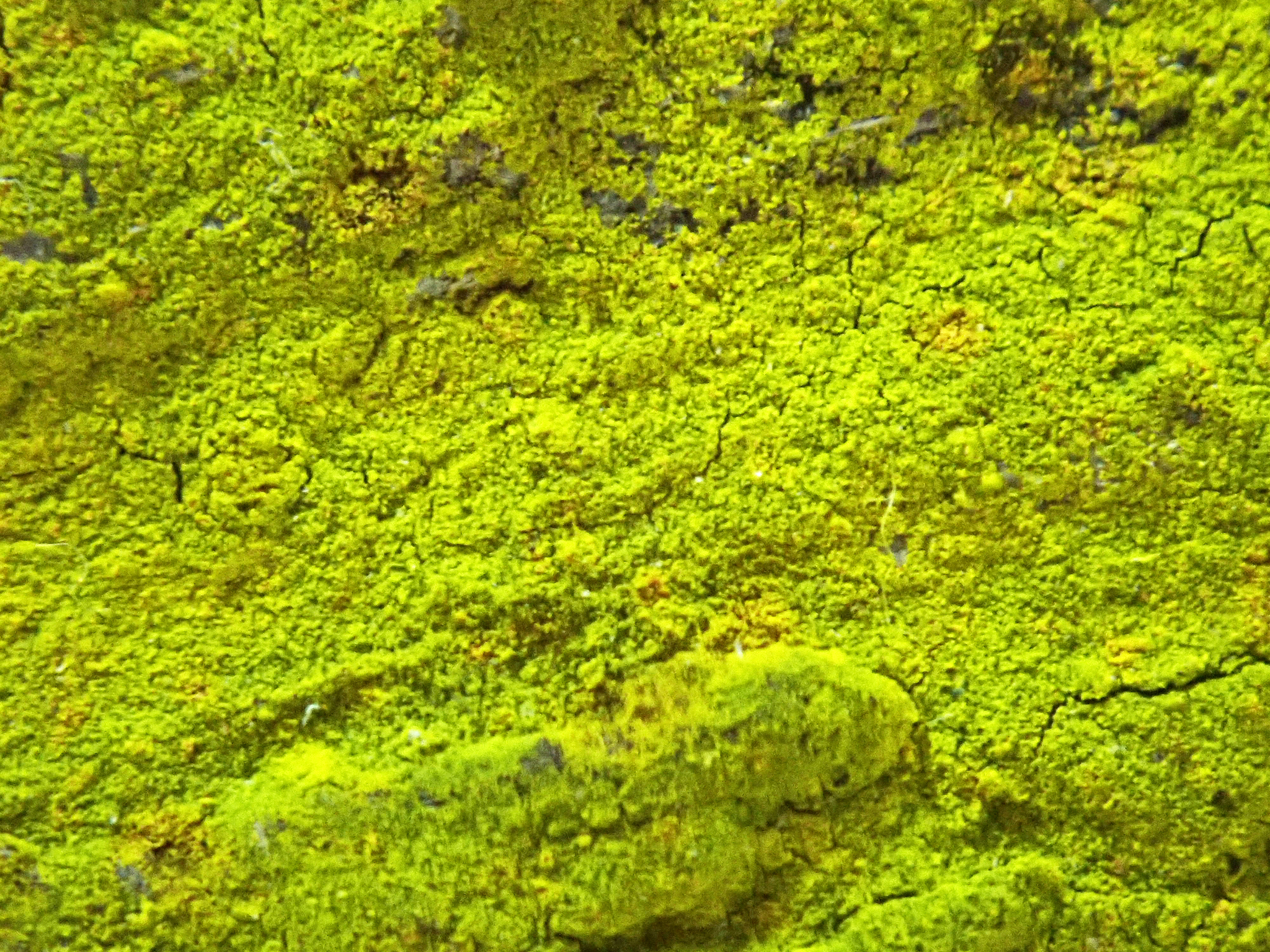
Chrysothrix xanthina

=== Placodioid ===
A placodioid lichen is a form of crustose lichen with lobed margins. These lobed edges, which radiate from the central part of the lichen, are its only growing sections; the central part of the lichen typically contains reproductive structures and does not expand. The growth rates of these lobes can vary – sometimes significantly – which can lead to some lobes being overgrown by others. When this happens, the overgrown lobes stop growing and are ultimately swallowed up by the expanding lichen. As with other crustose lichens, placodioid lichens have a cortex on their upper surface, but not their lower one. This allows them to be distinguished from foliose lichens, which can be similar in appearance but have both an upper and a lower cortex. Crustose lichens may be both placodioid and areolate, as in, for example, Variospora flavescens. The term "placodioid" derives from the Greek plakós, meaning "plaque" or "tablet", and the Latin suffix -oides – a contraction of the Greek oeides, which denotes similarity.

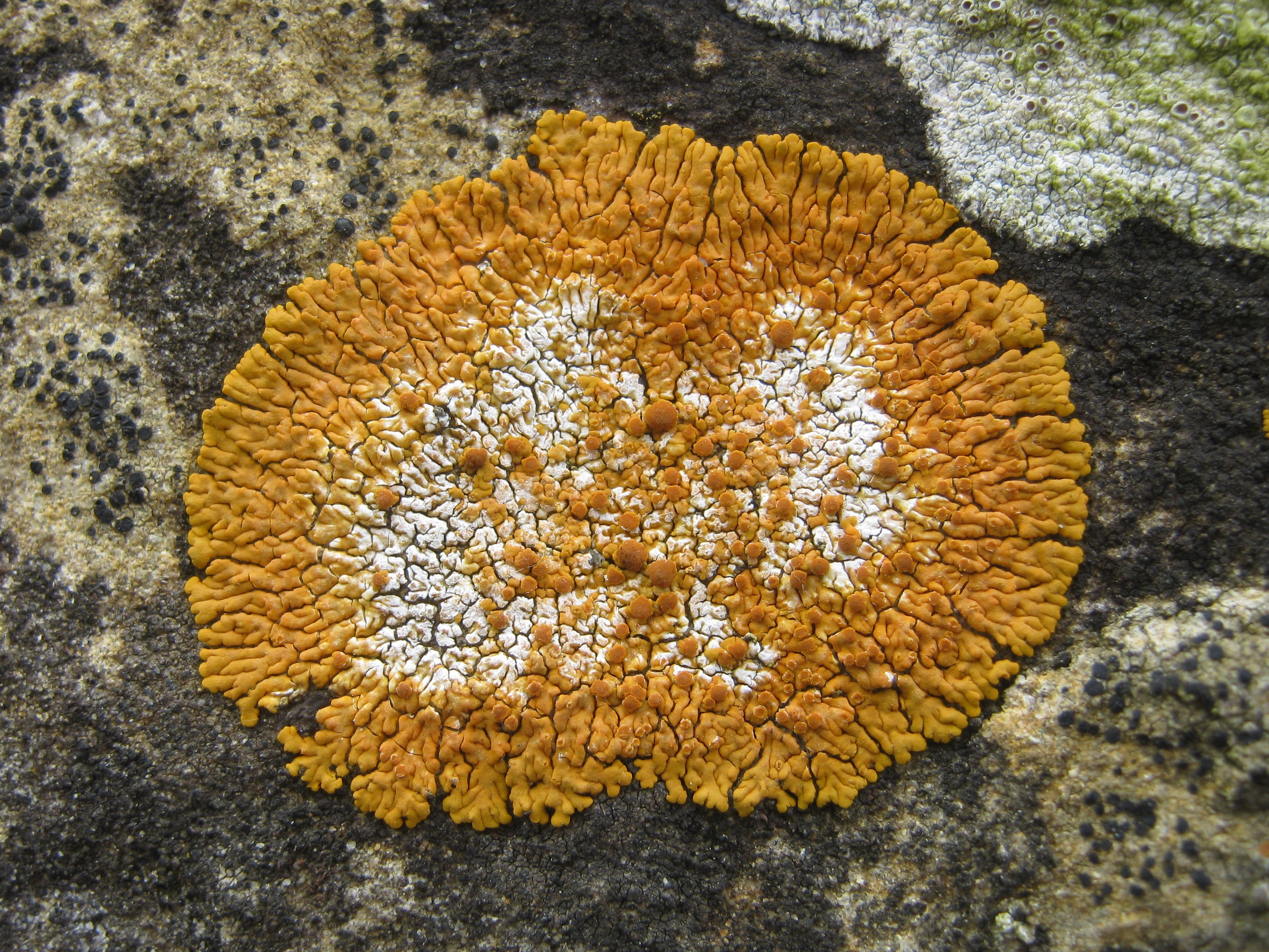
Variospora flavescens

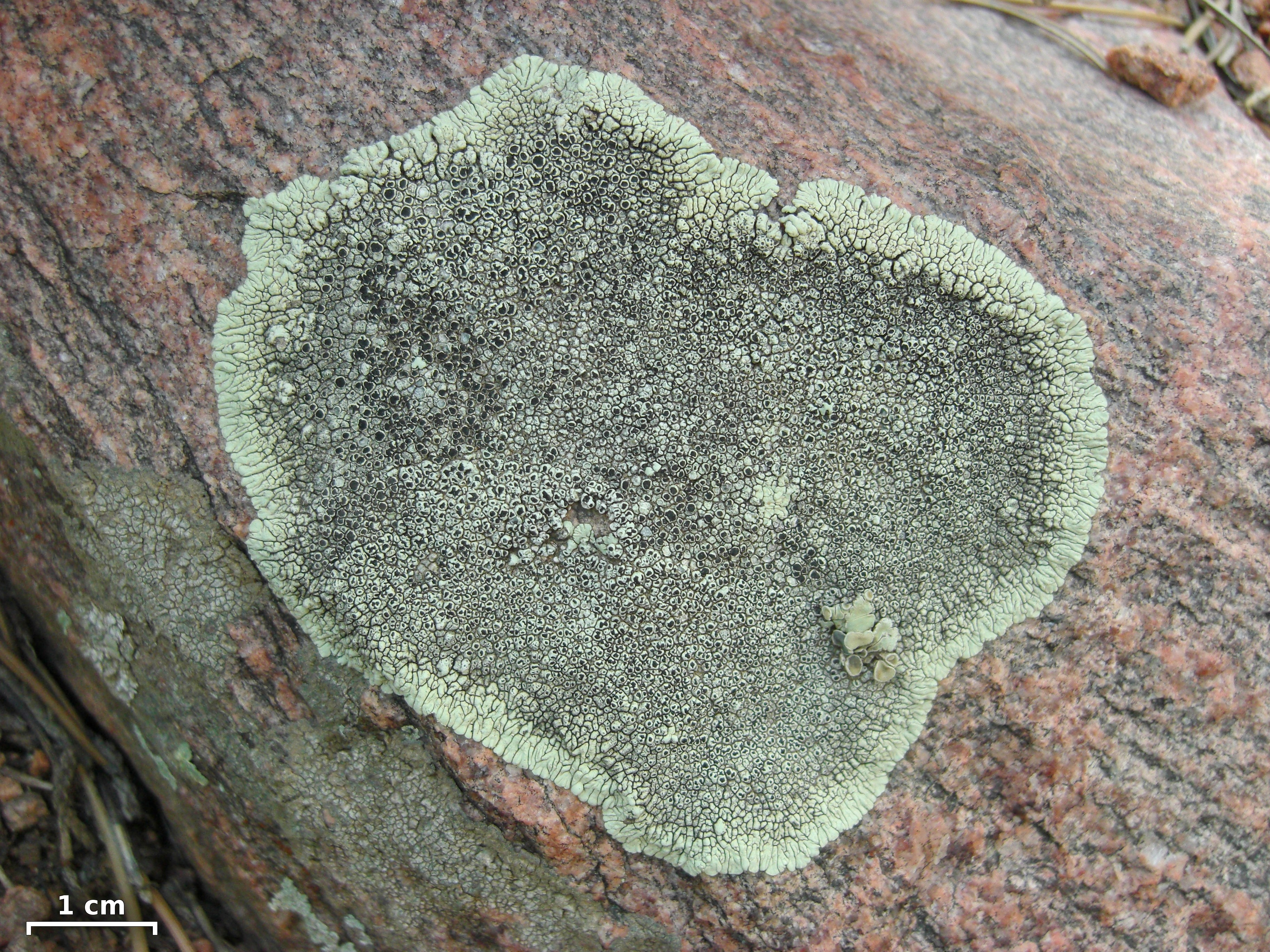
Dimelaena oreina

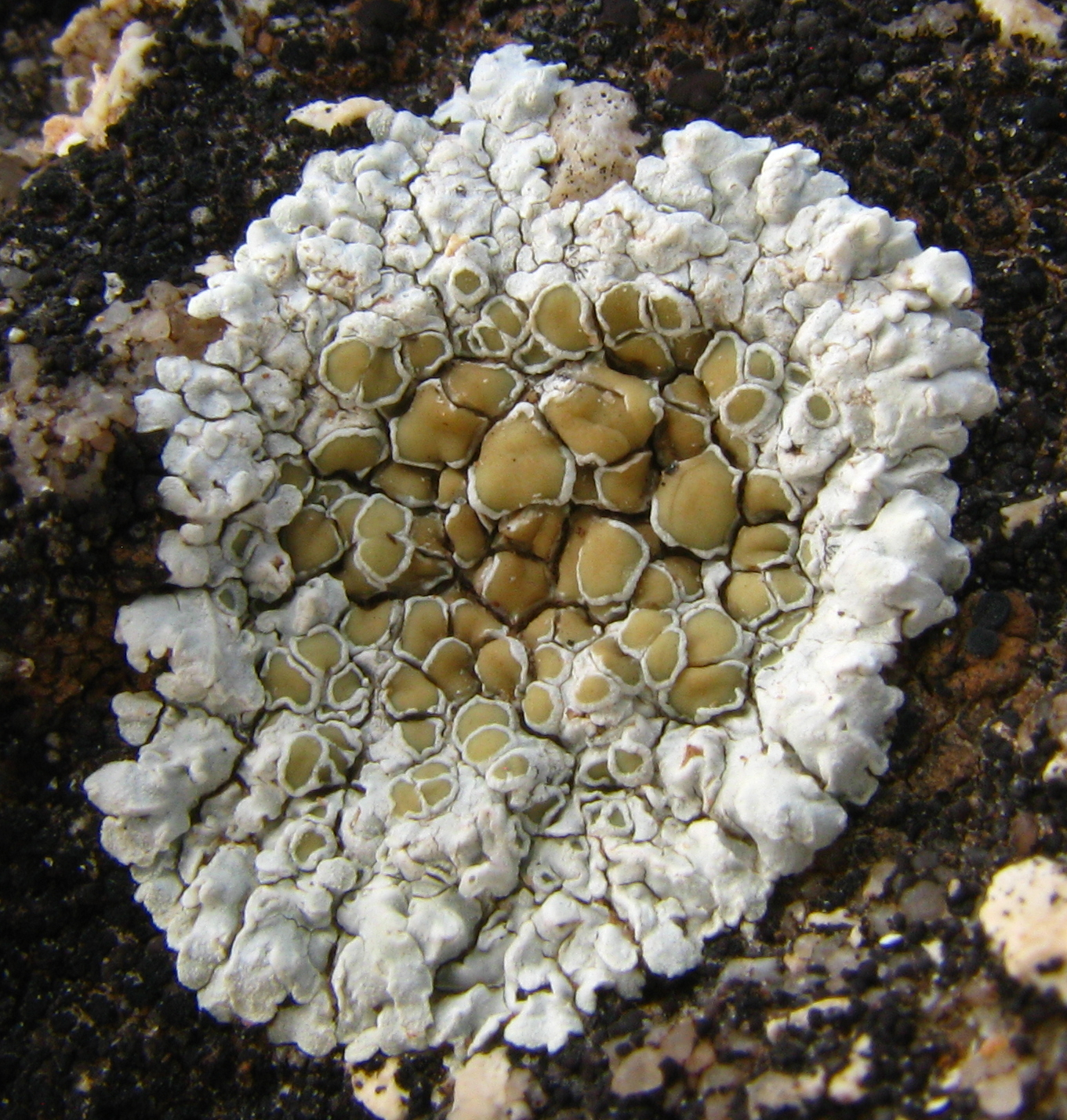
Lecanora valesiaca

=== Squamulose ===
A squamulous lichen has a thallus composed of small, scale-like plates – known as squamules – measuring 1–15 mm in diameter. These plates may be attached to the substrate across their entire lower surface, or they may be attached only along one edge, so that they overlap neighbouring plates like shingles on a roof. A squamulose lichen typically has no cortex on its lower surface, though a few species do. Some lichenologists consider squamulose lichens to be crustose lichens which peel up at their outer edges. Others consider them to be intermediate between crustose and foliose lichens. Squamulose lichens are particularly common in biological soil crust communities. In the Intermountain West of the United States, for example, almost 60% of all soil lichens are squamulose. The term "squamulose" is derived from the Latin squamulosus, meaning "provided with small scales" (from squamula, the diminutive of squama, which means "scale").

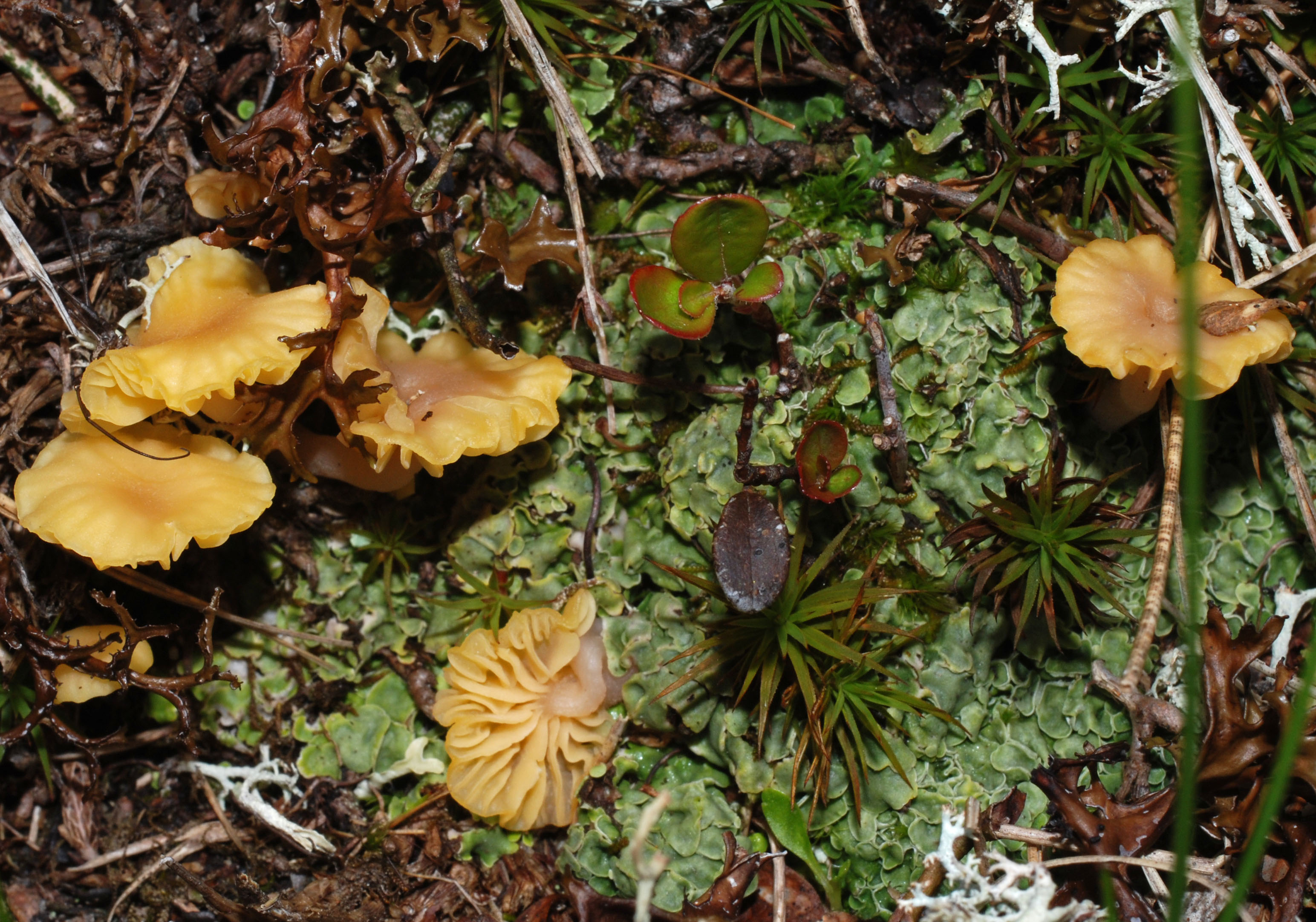
Lichenomphalia hudsoniana

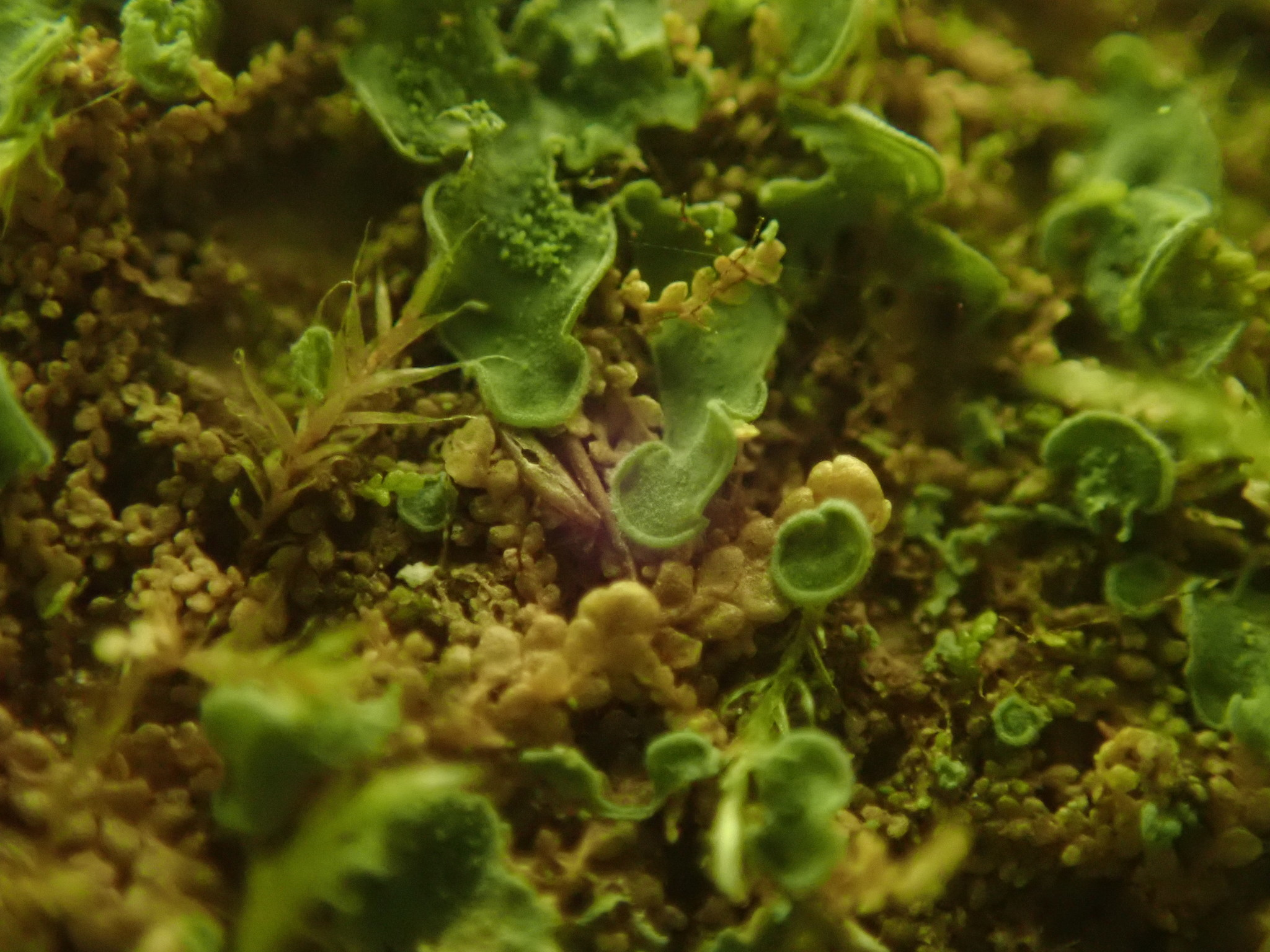
Normandina pulchella

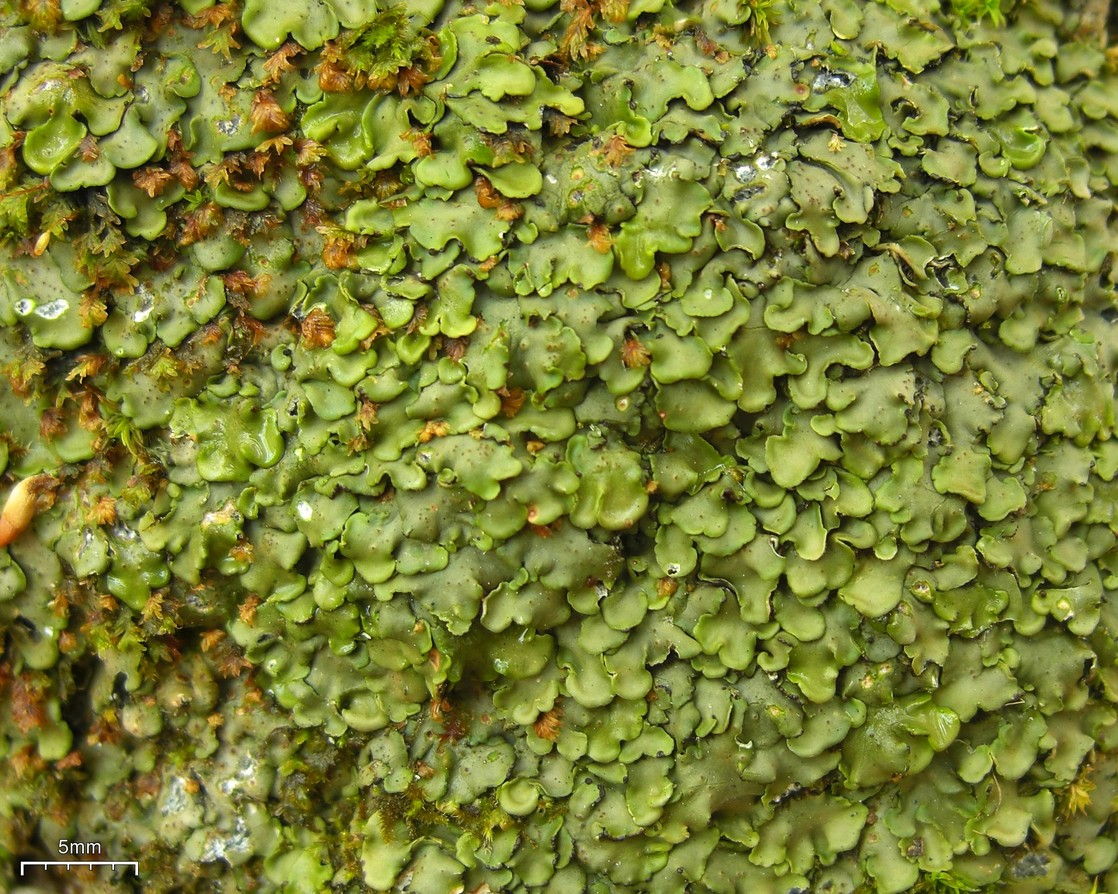
Placidium arboreum

== The "look-alikes" ==
In addition to the above forms, lichenologists have named a handful of informal growth forms for their resemblance to members of particular genera. Each of these is a subset of one of the growth forms described above. For an indication of what they look like, see the gallery below.

=== Alectorioid ===
Alectorioid lichens are either members of, or resemble members of, the genus Alectoria. They are fruticose, typically with a beard-like thallus that is dangling or clustered; members of the genera Bryoria, Oropogon, Pseudephebe, and Sulcaria also have this growth type.

=== Catapyrenioid ===
Catapyrenioid lichens were historically members of the genus Catapyrenium; many have now been moved to other genera within the family Verrucariaceae. They are squamulose and lack algae in their hymenium – the part of the fruiting structure where spores are formed.

=== Cetrarioid ===
Cetrarioid lichens were historically classified in the genus Cetraria; many have now been moved to other genera within the family Parmeliaceae. They are foliose or subfruticose with erect lobes, and their apothecia and pycnidia are located on the lobe margins.

=== Hypogymnioid ===
Hypogymnioid lichens are either members of, or resemble members of, the genus Hypogymnia (which are also known as "tube lichens", "bone lichens", or "pillow lichens"). They are foliose with lobes that are swollen and inflated, and without rhizines on their undersides. Members of the genus Menegazzia also have this growth type.

=== Parmelioid ===
Parmelioid lichens were historically classified in the genus Parmelia; many have now been moved to other genera within the family Parmeliaceae. They are primarily foliose, often closely attached to the substrate upon which they grow, and have apothecia and pycnidia over their entire surface (laminal), rather than only at the margins.

=== Usneoid ===
Usneoid lichens are either members of, or resemble members of, the genus Usnea (which are known as "beard lichens"). They are fruticose with an elastic central axis in the medulla; members of the genus Dolichousnea also have this growth type.

Informal growth forms
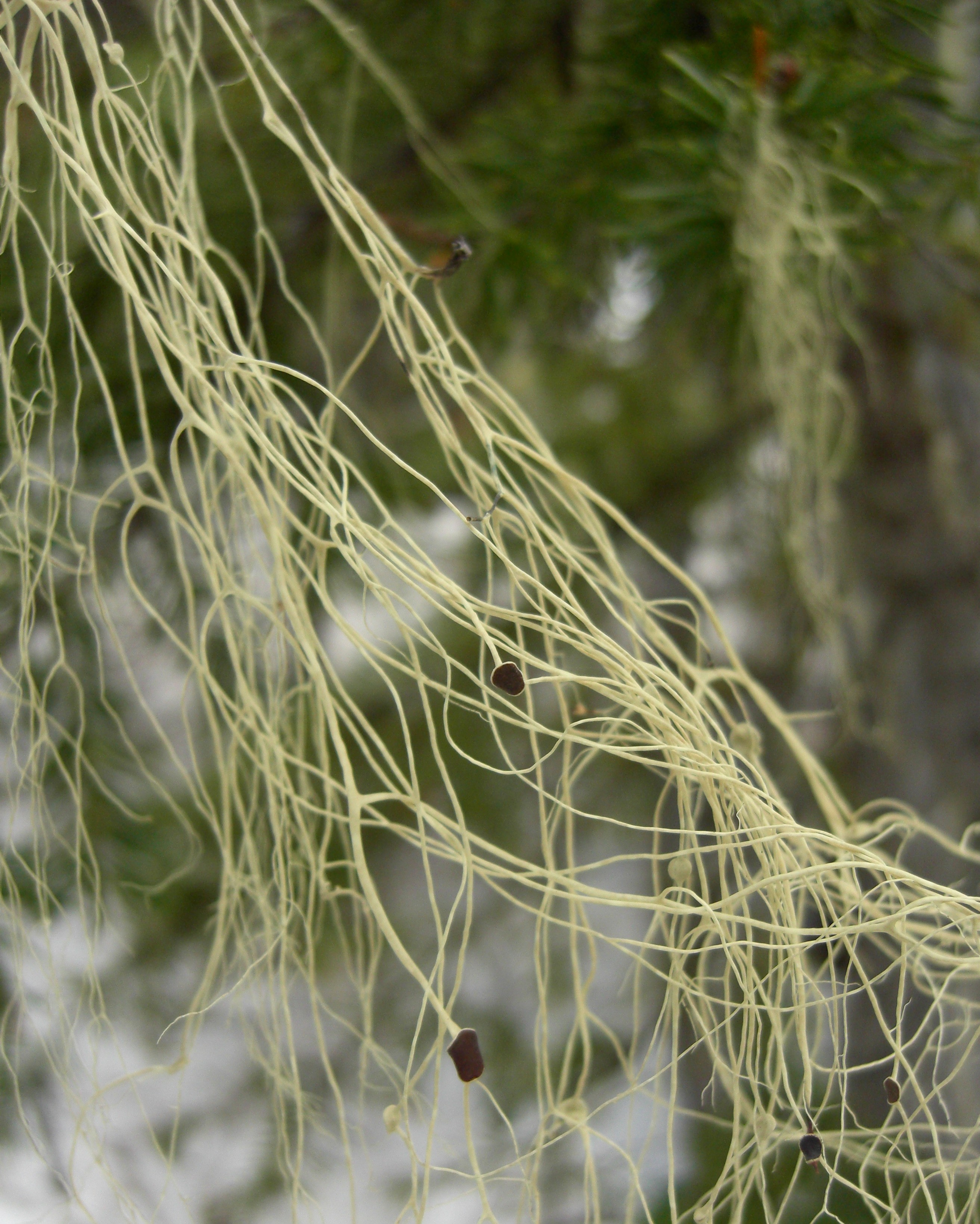
Alectorioid (Alectoria sarmentosa)

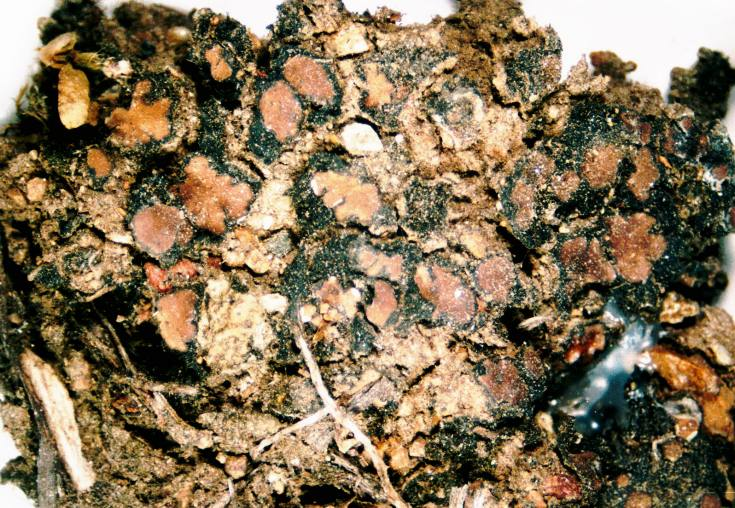
Catapyrenioid (Catapyrenium cinereum)

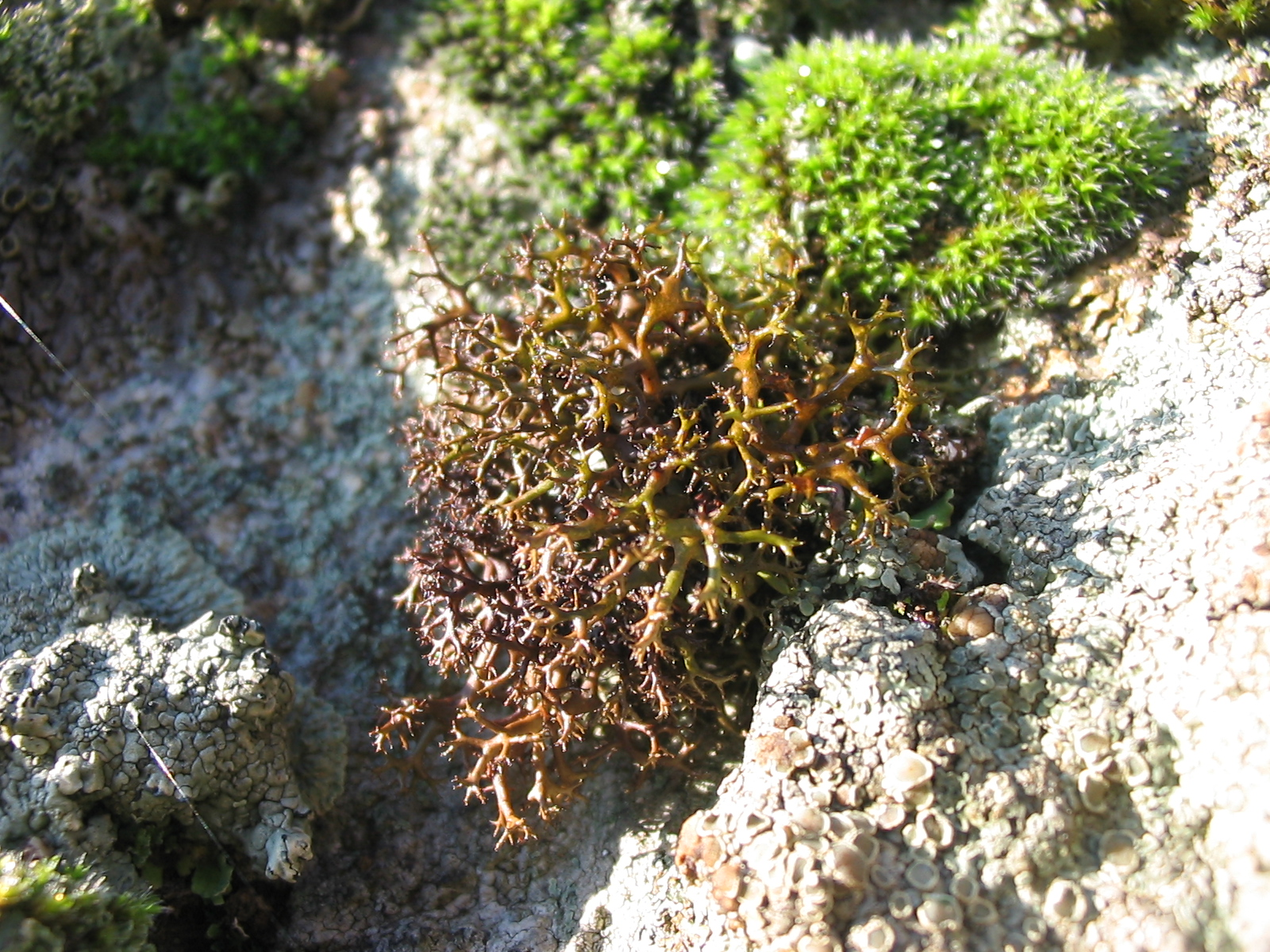
Cetrarioid (Cetraria aculeata)
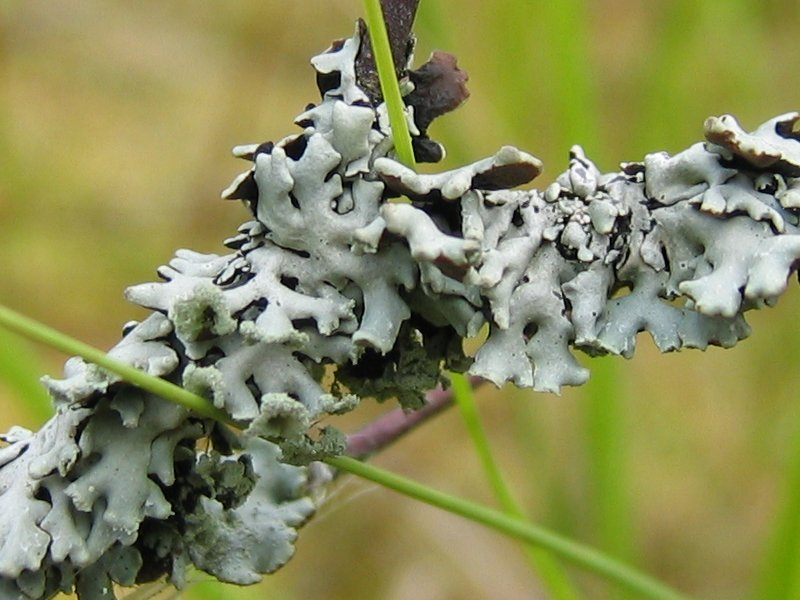
Hypogymnioid (Hypogymnia physodes)

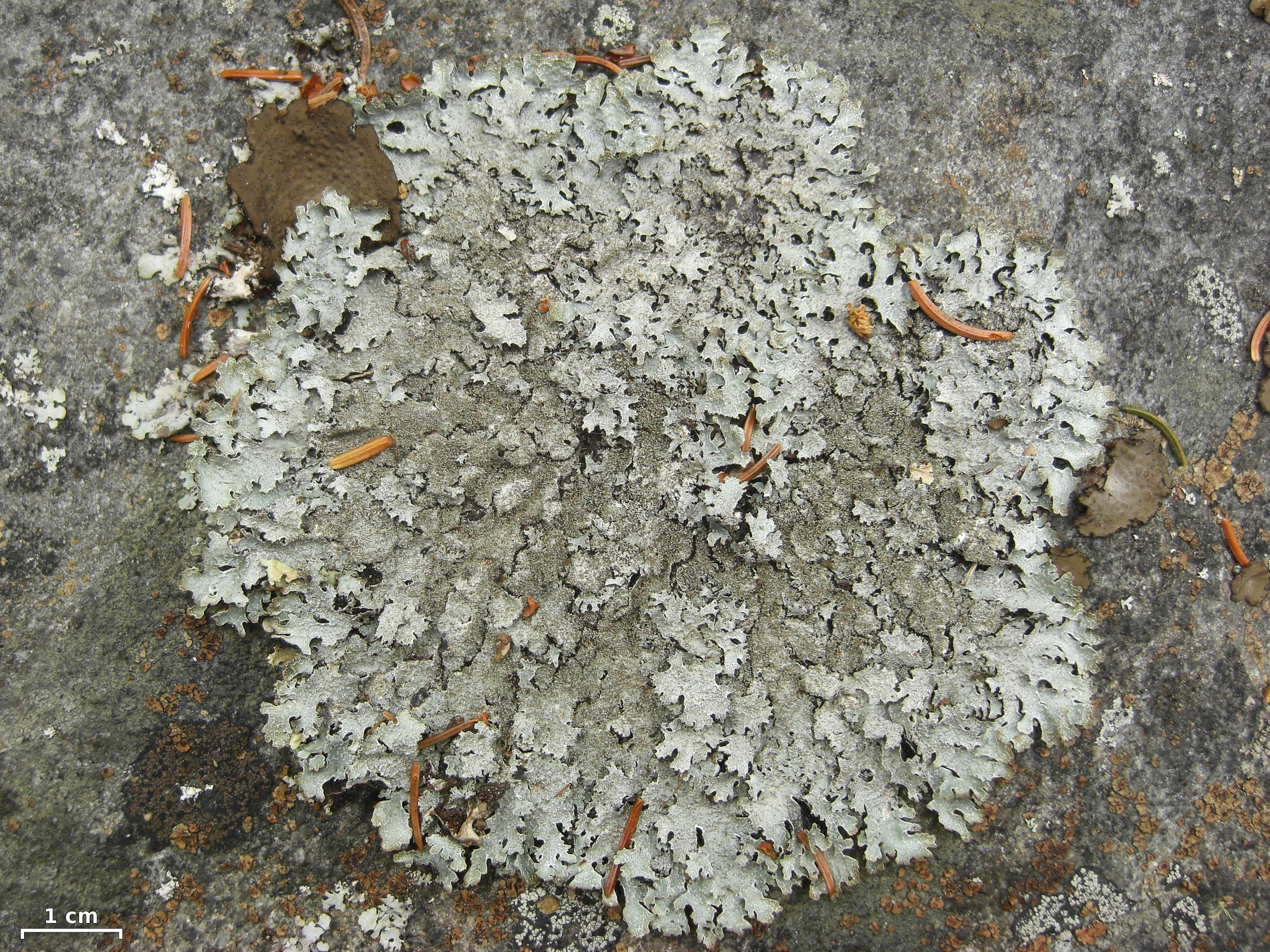
Parmelioid (Parmelia saxatilis)

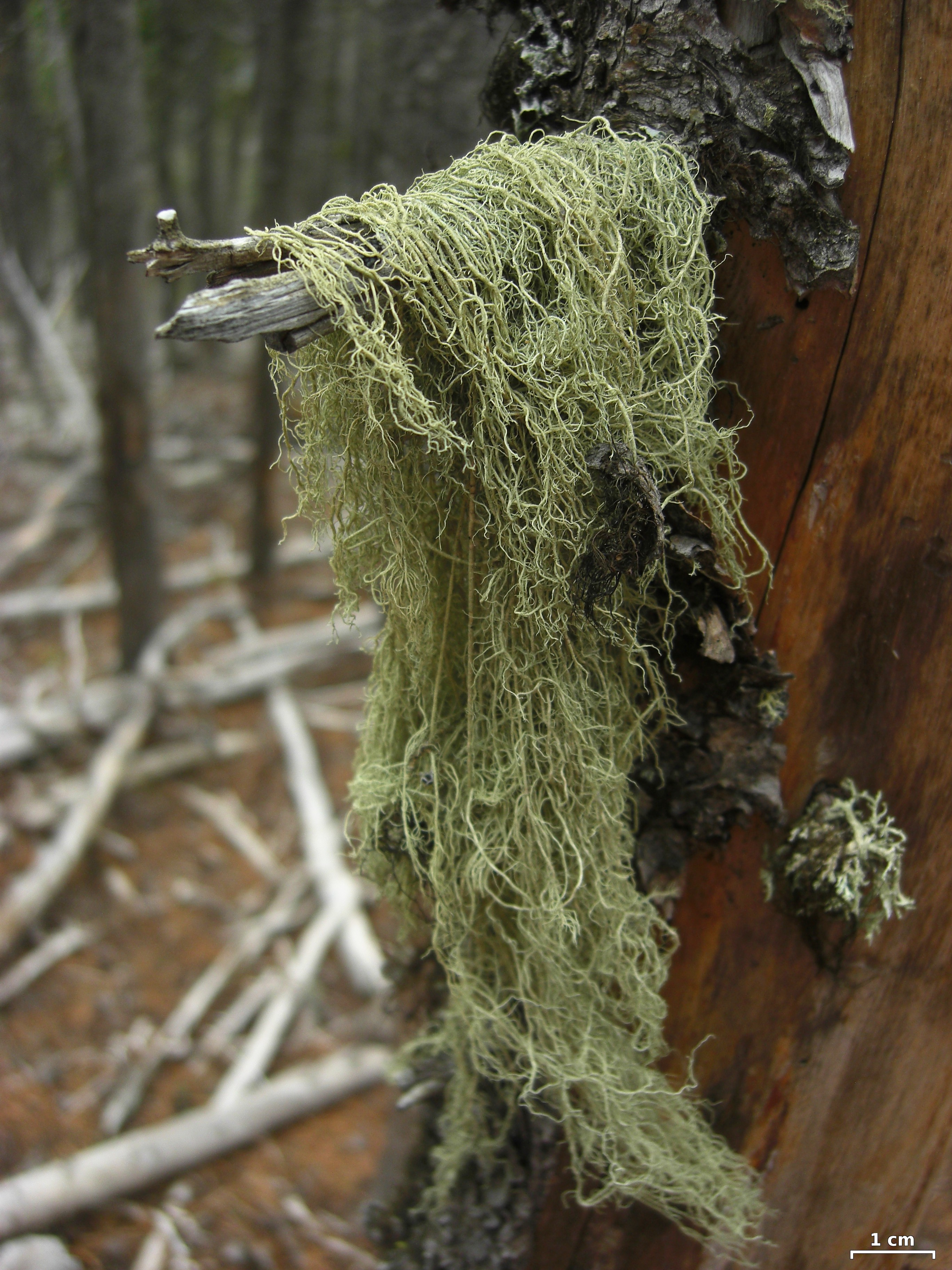
Usneoid (Usnea scabrata)

== See also ==
- Lichen morphology
- Symbiosis in lichens
