= List of lichens of Western Australia =

This is a list of lichens of Western Australia:

- Acarospora cervina
- Acarospora citrina
- Acarospora nodulosa
- Acarospora novae-hollandiae
- Acarospora sinopica
- Amandinea punctata
- Anisomeridium americanum
- Arthopyrenia analepta
- Arthothelium interveniens
- Aspicilia calcarea
- Aspicilia calcarea
- Australiaena streimannii
- Bacidia microphyllina
- Biatoropsis usnearum
- Buellia cretacea
- Buellia desertorum
- Buellia dijiana
- Buellia disciformis
- Buellia dissa
- Buellia epigaea
- Buellia farinulenta
- Buellia georgei
- Buellia glomerulans
- Buellia inturgescens
- Buellia lobata
- Buellia marginulata
- Buellia spuria
- Buellia stellulata
- Buellia stigmaea
- Buellia subalbula
- Buellia subcoronata
- Buellia subdisciformis
- Calicium abietinum
- Calicium glaucellum
- Calicium robustellum
- Calicium salicinum
- Calicium subquercinum
- Calicium tricolor
- Calicium victorianum
- Calicium victorianum
- Caloplaca cirrubescens
- Caloplaca cupulifera
- Caloplaca ferruginea
- Caloplaca flavorubescens
- Caloplaca granularis
- Caloplaca lactea
- Caloplaca lateritia
- Caloplaca leptozona
- Caloplaca luteoalba
- Caloplaca marina
- Caloplaca murorum
- Caloplaca murorum
- Candelaria concolor
- Candelariella vitellina
- Candelariella xanthostigma
- Candelariella xanthostigmoides
- Canomaculina subcaperata
- Canomaculina subsumpta
- Canoparmelia macrospora
- Canoparmelia owariensis
- Canoparmelia pruinata
- Canoparmelia subarida
- Catillaria chalybeia
- Catillaria lenticularis
- Catinaria atropurpurea
- Chaenotheca brunneola
- Chaenotheca carthusiae
- Chaenotheca chlorella
- Chaenotheca ferruginea
- Chaenothecopsis debilis
- Chaenothecopsis pusilla
- Chondropsis semiviridis
- Chrysothrix candelaris
- Cladia aggregata
- Cladia corallaizon
- Cladia ferdinandii
- Cladia inflata
- Cladia schizopora
- Cladia sullivanii
- Cladonia angustata
- Cladonia calyciformis
- Cladonia capitellata
- Cladonia capitellata
- Cladonia capitellata
- Cladonia cervicornis
- Cladonia chlorophaea
- Cladonia crispata
- Cladonia fimbriata
- Cladonia humilis
- Cladonia krempelhuberi
- Cladonia macilenta
- Cladonia merochlorophaea
- Cladonia pleurota
- Cladonia praetermissa
- Cladonia rigida
- Cladonia scabriuscula
- Cladonia southlandica
- Cladonia sulcata
- Cladonia sulcata
- Cladonia tessellata
- Clauzadeana macula
- Coccocarpia erythroxili
- Coccocarpia pellita
- Coelocaulon aculeatum
- Collema coccophorum
- Collema implicatum
- Collema leucocarpum
- Collema subconveniens
- Cyphelium trachylioides
- Degelia flabellata
- Dimelaena australiensis
- Dimelaena elevata
- Diploschistes almbornii
- Diploschistes euganeus
- Diploschistes gypsaceus
- Diploschistes hensseniae
- Diploschistes ocellatus
- Diploschistes scruposus
- Diploschistes sticticus
- Diploschistes thunbergianus
- Dirinaria aegialita
- Dirinaria applanata
- Dirinaria batavica
- Dirinaria confluens
- Dirinaria picta
- Endocarpon aridum
- Endocarpon helmsianum
- Endocarpon macrosporum
- Endocarpon pallidum
- Endocarpon pusillum
- Endocarpon robustum
- Endocarpon simplicatum
- Endocarpon simplicatum
- Ephebe lanata
- Flavoparmelia diffractaica
- Flavoparmelia ferax
- Flavoparmelia haysomii
- Flavoparmelia proeuplecta
- Flavoparmelia rutidota
- Flavoparmelia scabrosina
- Flavoparmelia secalonica
- Flavoparmelia soredians
- Flavoparmelia springtonensis
- Fuscidea cyathoides
- Gloeoheppia turgida
- Graphis afzelii
- Graphis scripta
- Haematomma eremaeum
- Haematomma similis
- Hafellia disciformis
- Hafellia dissa
- Hafellia reagens
- Heppia despreauxii
- Hertelidea pseudobotryosa
- Heterodea beaugleholei
- Heterodea muelleri
- Heterodermia dendritica
- Heterodermia japonica
- Heterodermia obscurata
- Heterodermia speciosa
- Hypocenomyce australis
- Hypocenomyce scalaris
- Hypogymnia lugubris
- Hypogymnia pulchrilobata
- Hypogymnia pulverata
- Hypogymnia subphysodes
- Imshaugia aleurites
- Lauderlindsaya borreri
- Lecanora arafurensis
- Lecanora arnhemica
- Lecanora austrointumescens
- Lecanora austrosorediosa
- Lecanora caesiorubella
- Lecanora elapheia
- Lecanora expallens
- Lecanora farinacea
- Lecanora flavidomarginata
- Lecanora flavopallida
- Lecanora helva
- Lecanora leprosa
- Lecanora lividocinerea
- Lecanora mayrhoferi
- Lecanora mobergiana
- Lecanora pallida
- Lecanora plumosa
- Lecanora pseudistera
- Lecanora rupicola
- Lecanora sphaerospora
- Lecanora tropica
- Lecidea capensis
- Lecidea contigua
- Lecidea fuscoatrula
- Lecidea hypnorum
- Lecidea multiflora
- Lecidea ochroleuca
- Lecidea sarcogynoides
- Lecidea tragorum
- Lecidea varians
- Lecidella stigmatea
- Lecidella sublapidica
- Leptogium corniculatum
- Leptogium phyllocarpum
- Letrouitia domingensis
- Lichina minutissima
- Megalospora occidentalis
- Menegazzia caesiopruinosa
- Menegazzia fertilis
- Menegazzia platytrema
- Microcalicium conversum
- Mycocalicium albonigricum
- Mycocalicium subtile
- Mycocalicium victoriae
- Mycoporum quercus
- Neofuscelia archeri
- Neofuscelia atrobarbatica
- Neofuscelia brattii
- Neofuscelia chudalupensis
- Neofuscelia convexa
- Neofuscelia glabrans
- Neofuscelia imitatrix
- Neofuscelia incantata
- Neofuscelia kondininensis
- Neofuscelia loxodella
- Neofuscelia luteonotata
- Neofuscelia pulla
- Neofuscelia remnantia
- Neofuscelia scabrosina
- Neofuscelia subbarbatica
- Neofuscelia subimitatrix
- Neofuscelia subprolixa
- Neofuscelia verrucella
- Normandina pulchella
- Ochrolechia pallescens
- Ochrolechia parella
- Ochrolechia subathallina
- Ochrolechia subpallescens
- Ochrolechia subrhodotropa
- Omphalina chromacea
- Omphalina umbellifera
- Pannaria obscura
- Pannoparmelia wilsonii
- Paraparmelia arida
- Paraparmelia atrocapnodes
- Paraparmelia bourgeanica
- Paraparmelia bourgeanica
- Paraparmelia conranensis
- Paraparmelia inconspicua
- Paraparmelia inselbergia
- Paraparmelia lumbschii
- Paraparmelia mongaensis
- Paraparmelia neoquintaria
- Paraparmelia saginata
- Paraparmelia sammyii
- Paraparmelia sargentii
- Paraparmelia subalpina
- Paraporpidia glauca
- Paraporpidia leptocarpa
- Parmelia erumpens
- Parmelina conlabrosa
- Parmelina endoleuca
- Parmelina labrosa
- Parmelina pseudorelicina
- Parmelina quercina
- Parmentaria microspora
- Parmotrema chinense
- Parmotrema cooperi
- Parmotrema praesorediosum
- Parmotrema pseudonilgherrense
- Parmotrema tinctorum
- Peltigera didactyla
- Peltigera dolichorrhiza
- Peltigera polydactyla
- Peltula bolanderi
- Peltula cylindrica
- Peltula euploca
- Peltula impressa
- Peltula langei
- Peltula obscurans
- Peltula omphaliza
- Peltula patellata
- Peltula placodizans
- Peltula radicata
- Peltula rodriguesii
- Peltula subglebosa
- Peltula zahlbruckneri
- Pertusaria gibberosa
- Pertusaria leioplacella
- Pertusaria remota
- Pertusaria scaberula
- Pertusaria thiophaninica
- Pertusaria thiospoda
- Pertusaria trachyspora
- Pertusaria trimera
- Phacopsis oxyspora
- Phaeophyscia endococcinodes
- Phaeophyscia orbicularis
- Phloeopeccania australiensis
- Physcia aipolia
- Physcia alba
- Physcia alboplumbea
- Physcia caesia
- Physcia stellaris
- Physcia tribacia
- Physcia virella
- Physconia distorta
- Placidium squamulosum
- Placopsis perrugosa
- Polysporina simplex
- Porina guentheri
- Porina hyperleptalea
- Porina kantvilasii
- Porocyphus lichinelloides
- Porpidia macrocarpa
- Pseudocyphellaria aurata
- Pseudocyphellaria billardierei
- Pseudocyphellaria crocata
- Pseudocyphellaria neglecta
- Psora crystallifera
- Psora decipiens
- Punctelia subalbicans
- Punctelia subflava
- Punctelia subrudecta
- Pyrrhospora laeta
- Pyxine australiensis
- Pyxine coccifera
- Pyxine cocoes
- Pyxine convexior
- Pyxine petricola
- Pyxine plumea
- Pyxine subcinerea
- Ramalea cochleata
- Ramalina australiensis
- Ramalina canariensis
- Ramalina celastri
- Ramalina fissa
- Ramalina glaucescens
- Ramalina ootropica
- Ramalina subfraxinea
- Ramalina subfraxinea
- Ramboldia petraeoides
- Ramboldia stuartii
- Relicinopsis rahengensis
- Rhizocarpon geographicum
- Rhizocarpon polycarpum
- Rhizocarpon tinei
- Rimelia reticulata
- Rinodina bischoffii
- Rinodina conradii
- Rinodina gennarii
- Rinodina thiomela
- Rinodina xanthomelana
- Rinodinella halophila
- Roccella montagnei
- Sarcogyne clavus
- Sarcogyne privigna
- Siphula coriacea
- Solenopsora vulturiensis
- Sphinctrina leucopoda
- Spilonema paradoxum
- Stereocaulon corticatulum
- Teloschistes chrysophthalmus
- Teloschistes sieberianus
- Tephromela arafurensis
- Tephromela atra
- Thelotrema lepadinum
- Thysanothecium hccii
- Thysanothecium scutellatum
- Toninia australiensis
- Toninia caeruleonigricans
- Toninia cumulata
- Trapelia coarctata
- Trapelia mooreana
- Trypethelium eluteriae
- Umbilicaria polyphylla
- Usnea confusa
- Usnea inermis
- Usnea maculata
- Usnea pulvinata
- Usnea scabrida
- Usnea subeciliata
- Usnea undulata
- Verrucaria baldensis
- Verrucaria calciseda
- Verrucaria compacta
- Verrucaria maura
- Verrucaria microsporoides
- Verrucaria subdiscreta
- Xanthoparmelia alternata
- Xanthoparmelia antleriformis
- Xanthoparmelia arapilensis
- Xanthoparmelia australasica
- Xanthoparmelia bungendorensis
- Xanthoparmelia burmeisteri
- Xanthoparmelia centralis
- Xanthoparmelia cheelii
- Xanthoparmelia concomitans
- Xanthoparmelia congensis
- Xanthoparmelia congesta
- Xanthoparmelia constipata
- Xanthoparmelia convolutella
- Xanthoparmelia cravenii
- Xanthoparmelia darlingensis
- Xanthoparmelia dayiana
- Xanthoparmelia dichotoma
- Xanthoparmelia digitiformis
- Xanthoparmelia dissitifolia
- Xanthoparmelia donneri
- Xanthoparmelia eilifii
- Xanthoparmelia elixii
- Xanthoparmelia everardensis
- Xanthoparmelia exillima
- Xanthoparmelia filsonii
- Xanthoparmelia flindersiana
- Xanthoparmelia fumigata
- Xanthoparmelia furcata
- Xanthoparmelia gerhardii
- Xanthoparmelia glareosa
- Xanthoparmelia globulifera
- Xanthoparmelia gongylodes
- Xanthoparmelia hybridiza
- Xanthoparmelia hypoleia
- Xanthoparmelia hypoleiella
- Xanthoparmelia incerta
- Xanthoparmelia incrustata
- Xanthoparmelia isidiosa
- Xanthoparmelia kalbarriensis
- Xanthoparmelia kosciuszkoensis
- Xanthoparmelia lineola
- Xanthoparmelia louisii
- Xanthoparmelia louisii
- Xanthoparmelia metaclystoides
- Xanthoparmelia mexicana
- Xanthoparmelia microcephala
- Xanthoparmelia molliuscula
- Xanthoparmelia mougeotina
- Xanthoparmelia nana
- Xanthoparmelia nashii
- Xanthoparmelia neotinctina
- Xanthoparmelia norpraegnans
- Xanthoparmelia norpumila
- Xanthoparmelia norstrigosa
- Xanthoparmelia notata
- Xanthoparmelia oleosa
- Xanthoparmelia parvoclystoides
- Xanthoparmelia parvoincerta
- Xanthoparmelia pertinax
- Xanthoparmelia praegnans
- Xanthoparmelia prodomokosii
- Xanthoparmelia pumila
- Xanthoparmelia pustuliza
- Xanthoparmelia remanens
- Xanthoparmelia reptans
- Xanthoparmelia rupestris
- Xanthoparmelia subcrustacea
- Xanthoparmelia subdistorta
- Xanthoparmelia subnuda
- Xanthoparmelia substrigosa
- Xanthoparmelia succedans
- Xanthoparmelia taractica
- Xanthoparmelia tasmanica
- Xanthoparmelia tegeta
- Xanthoparmelia terrestris
- Xanthoparmelia versicolor
- Xanthoparmelia weberi
- Xanthoparmelia weberiella
- Xanthoparmelia willisii
- Xanthoparmelia xanthofarinosa
- Xanthoparmelia xanthomelaena
- Xanthoparmelia xanthomelanoides
- Xanthoparmelia yowaensis
- Xanthoria ligulata
- Xanthoria parietina
