= Chaenothecopsis vainioana =

Scientific classification
- Domain: Eukaryota
- Kingdom: Fungi
- Division: Ascomycota
- Class: Eurotiomycetes
- Order: Mycocaliciales
- Family: Mycocaliciaceae
- Genus: Chaenothecopsis
- Species: C. vainioana

Binomial name
- Chaenothecopsis vainioana (Nádv.) Tibell (1979)

Synonyms
- Calicium vainioanum Nádv. (1940)

Species of lichenicolous fungus

Chaenothecopsis vainioana is a species of tiny, pin-like fungus that lives on lichens and algal colonies, belonging to the family Caliciaceae. The species is named in honour of the Finnish lichenologist Edvard August Vainio. These fungi produce distinctive black, stalked structures resembling miniature matchsticks that measure less than a millimetre in height, with oval-shaped heads containing spores. They typically grow on the surfaces of lichens containing specific types of green algae, particularly favouring old oak trees in partially open woodland areas across several European countries. Despite its widespread distribution across hemiboreal Europe, including Finland, Sweden, Denmark, Greece, Estonia, and parts of Russia, C. vainioana has historically been underreported due to its minute size and specialised habitat requirements, making it appear rarer than records indicate.

== Taxonomy ==
The species was originally classified as Calicium vainioanum by Josef Nádvorník in 1940. The type specimen was collected in Uppland, Sweden. The specific epithet honours Finnish lichenologist Edvard August Vainio. It was later transferred to the genus Chaenothecopsis by Leif Tibell in 1979, based on its anatomical characteristics. The species belongs to the order Caliciales, which includes many small pin-like fungi that often grow on lichens or algae.

== Description ==
Chaenothecopsis vainioana is characterized by its small, stalked fruit bodies (apothecia) that resemble tiny pins or matchsticks. The apothecia measure between 0.41 and 0.58 mm in height. They have black, broadly obovate (egg-shaped) heads called capitula that measure 0.18 to 0.26 mm in diameter, and slender stalks that are 0.04 to 0.07 mm thick. The stalks are often tinged dark brown.

The stalk structure consists of irregularly interwoven, pale hyphae (fungal filaments) in the central part, with a dark reddish-brown outer layer where the hyphae are largely arranged parallel to the length of the stalk. The head of the apothecium contains a cone-shaped, dark blue-green spore-producing region (hypothecium).

When tested with chemical spot tests, all parts of the apothecia turn yellowish-brown with potassium hydroxide solution (K+). The outer layer of the stalk, the protective covering (excipulum), and the upper layer of the spore-producing region turn more intensively red with nitric acid (HNO_{3}+).

The spores are ellipsoid (oval-shaped), divided by a single septum (internal partition), and measure 7.3 to 9.3 by 2.6 to 3.3 micrometres. The spore at the bottom of each spore sac (ascus) is often longer and narrower than the others.

Chaenothecopsis vainioana is similar to C. epithallina, but can be distinguished by its larger apothecia and smaller spores. C. epithallina appears to be restricted to growing on the lichen Chaenotheca trichialis, which contains a different type of algal partner (Stichococcus).

== Habitat, distribution, and ecology ==
Chaenothecopsis vainioana is parasitic or parasymbiotic, meaning it lives on or with other organisms without necessarily harming them. It typically grows on algal colonies or lichen bodies (thalli) that contain the green algae Trentepohlia or Trebouxia, and is sometimes found on thalli of Calicium salicinum.

In the hemiboreal zone of Europe (the transition between temperate and boreal forests), C. vainioana strongly prefers the trunks of old oak trees in relatively open areas. It has occasionally been collected on trunks of alder (Alnus glutinosa) and spruce (Picea abies), as well as on exposed wood. The species is often found in association with other Caliciales fungi such as Calicium salicinum, C. adspersum, C. viride, Coniocybe coniophaea, Chaenotheca trichialis, and Microcalicium subpedicellatum.

As of 1981, the species was considered overlooked and was known from only a few localities in Czechoslovakia and Finland, with new records from Denmark, Greece, and Sweden. Tibell suggested that the species was likely more widespread than previously thought, but had been underreported due to its small size and specialized habitat. It was later recorded in Estonia, in the Republic of Karelia (North-Western European Russia), and in the Leningrad Region of Russia.
