= Calicium sequoiae =

Conservation status
- Endangered (IUCN 3.1)

Scientific classification
- Kingdom: Fungi
- Division: Ascomycota
- Class: Lecanoromycetes
- Order: Caliciales
- Family: Caliciaceae
- Genus: Calicium
- Species: C. sequoiae

Binomial name
- Calicium sequoiae C.B.Williams & Tibell (2008)

Species of lichen

Calicium sequoiae is a crustose lichen that has only been found growing on old-growth redwood trees in California. It is a species of pin lichen (genus Calicium) in the family Caliciaceae. Apothecia are white-powder coated (pruinose). The unusual ascospores have spiral ridges.

== Taxonomy ==
Calicium sequoiae was formally described in 2008 by Cameron Williams and Leif Tibell after canopy work in old-growth redwood stands of northwestern California. The holotype was taken 30 m (98 ft) above the ground on the fibrous bark of a large Sequoia sempervirens in Prairie Creek Redwoods State Park. Williams and Tibell coined the epithet to emphasise the close ecological tie to redwood trees. Morphologically the species is distinguished within Calicium by the combination of stalks that turn I+ blue, a dense white pruina on the apothecial rim, and ascospores ornamented with prominent spiral ridges; chemically it is the only member of the genus in which thamnolic acid is the dominant secondary metabolite.

Phylogenetic analyses of internal transcribed spacer rDNA sequences placed C. sequoiae in "Clade II" of the calicioid Physciaceae, clustering with C. adspersum, C. chlorosporum, C. lenticulare, and two species of Cyphelium, while remaining clearly separate from the type species of the genus, C. viride. Within this clade no single morphological or chemical synapomorphy unites all members.

== Description ==
The lichen forms a crustose, granular thallus that sits on (or occasionally just under) the bark surface. Granules coalesce into a tessellated yellow-to-green mosaic and house green algal partners from the genus Trebouxia. Standard spot tests give K+ (bright yellow) and Pd+ (orange) reactions, reflecting the presence of thamnolic acid; C and KC are negative, and the thallus shows no fluorescence under long-wave ultraviolet light.

Black, pin-like apothecia rise 0.5–0.9 mm high on stiff stalks 70–140 micrometres (μm) thick. A heavy white pruina dusts the lower surface and rim of the excipulum, often coating the mazaedium (the loose spore mass released after the asci disintegrate). The capitulum is broadly lens-shaped to nearly spherical (0.23–0.42 mm across). The excipulum and hypothecium are dark brown, the latter domed over the stalk apex. Asci are evanescent (short-lasting), broadly club shaped (roughly 20 × 6 μm) and contain eight bi- to triseriately arranged spores. Mature ascospores are 8.5–11 × 3.4–4.4 μm, two-celled, medium grey in color, and encircled by a coarse network of left-handed spiral ridges that meet at the poles; with age the ridges can fracture irregularly. The stalk tissue contains starch and therefore stains I+ blue, a feature visible even to the naked eye when a whole apothecium is mounted successively in K and iodine.

== Habitat and distribution ==
Calicium sequoiae is known only from low-elevation, old-growth redwood forests in Humboldt and Del Norte counties, California, between 40.3° N and 41.5° N and within 37 km (23 mi) of the Pacific coast. Verified populations occur in Humboldt Redwoods State Park, Prairie Creek Redwoods State Park, Redwood National Park and Six Rivers National Forest. All collections were taken 20–80 m (66–262 ft) above ground on the thick, fibrous bark of veteran Sequoia sempervirens trunks growing on moist alluvial plains. The shaded but well-ventilated inner crown provides a relatively dry, stable microhabitat that appears essential for the species; it has never been recorded on younger redwoods or on other tree taxa sampled in the same forests.

In 2021, Calicium sequoiae was assessed for the global IUCN Red List. Because of ongoing declines in the extent and quality of habitat and inferred ongoing declines in the extent of occurrence, it has been assessed as an endangered species.
