= Calicium brachysporum =

Scientific classification
- Domain: Eukaryota
- Kingdom: Fungi
- Division: Ascomycota
- Class: Lecanoromycetes
- Order: Caliciales
- Family: Caliciaceae
- Genus: Calicium
- Species: C. brachysporum

Binomial name
- Calicium brachysporum (Nádv.) K.Knudsen, Kocourk. & Lendemer (2020)

Synonyms
- Cyphelium brachysporum Nádv. (1942)

Species of lichen

Calicium brachysporum is a species of leprose lichen in the family Caliciaceae.

== Taxonomy ==
The first specimen of Calicium brachysporum (originally identified as Cyphelium tigillare) was collected in 1903 in the Temecula Valley near Murrieta Hot Springs by Hermann Edward Hasse. The specimen was collected from the dead branches of an Adenostoma fasciculatum (greasewood) plant. After the collection of the specimen in 1903 of the currently labeled Cyphelium tigillare, the sample eventually made its way to Europe where in 1942, the specimen was later discovered by lichenologist Josef Nádvorník who identified the species as Cyphelium brachysporum.

In 2003, Leif Tibell, a Swedish lichenologist, combined the species Cyphelium brachysporum with C. notarisii because he thought that Cyphelium brachysporum was an immature C. notarisii. From 2003 to 2005, the species was then renamed once again as Cyphelium brachysporum after further examination comparing Hasse's collections to a modern collection.

The species Cyphelium brachysporum was changed one final time after a molecular study of Cyphelium. The study resulted in Cyphelium tigillare and Cyphelium notarisii both being transferred over to the genus Calicium. Due to the morphological similarities between these species and Cyphelium brachysporum in addition to species from the Cyphelium genus no longer being found in North America anymore, Cyphelium brachysporum was transferred to the Calicium genus.

== Description ==
Calicium brachysporum appears as yellow apothecia. This species is typically confused with C. tigillare or C. notarisii due to their similar apothecia. C. brachysporum has 1-septate (internally partitioned) ascospores that are 10–15 by 10–12 μm with a bumpy surface.

== Habitat and distribution ==
The species Calicium brachysporum is endemic to south-central California. The species is typically found within unburned oak savannas of a Mediterranean climate.
