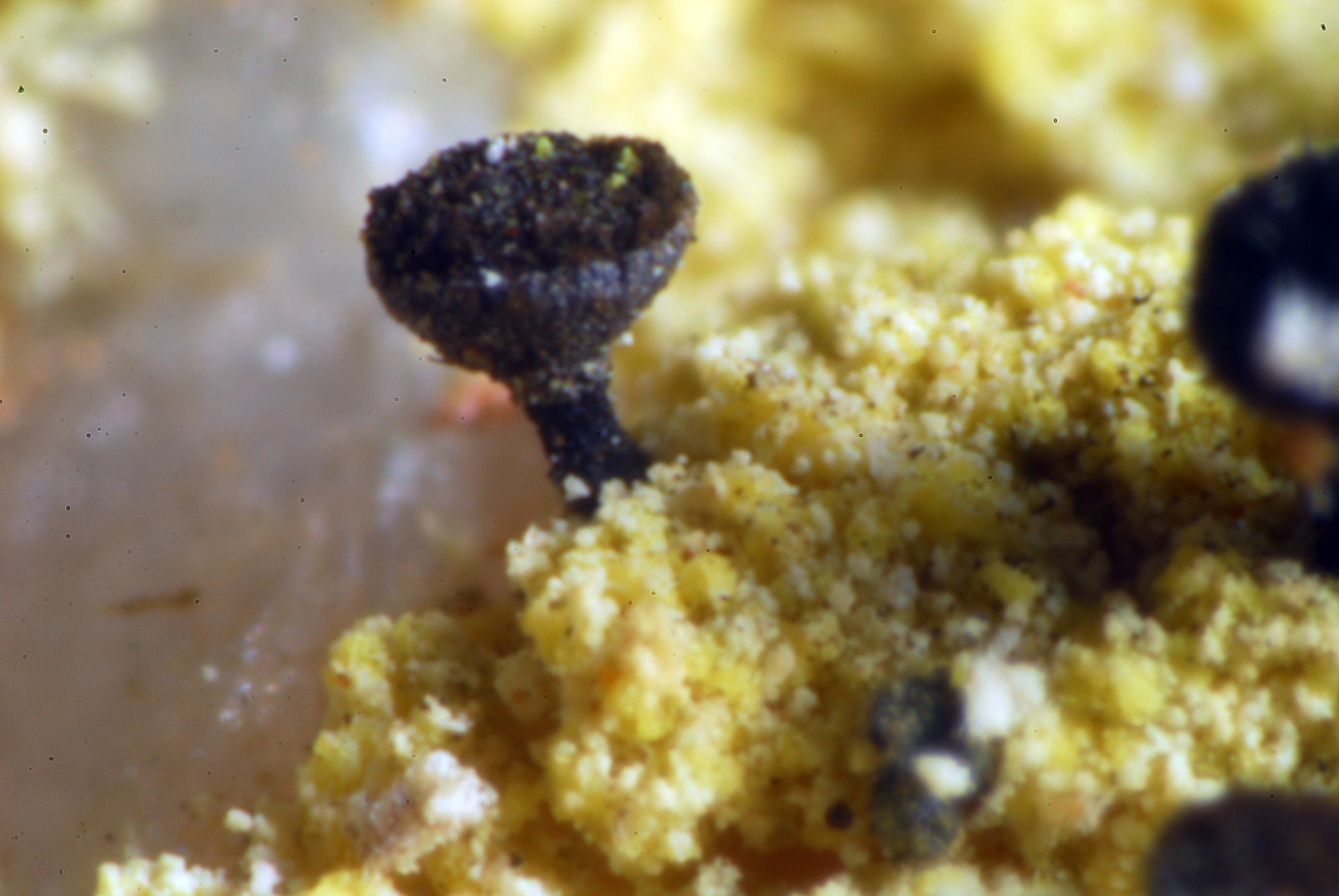

Conservation status
- Secure (NatureServe)

Scientific classification
- Domain: Eukaryota
- Kingdom: Fungi
- Division: Ascomycota
- Class: Lecanoromycetes
- Order: Caliciales
- Family: Caliciaceae
- Genus: Calicium
- Species: C. corynellum

Binomial name
- Calicium corynellum (Ach.) Ach. (1803)

Synonyms
- Lichen corynellus Ach. (1799); Caliciella corynella (Ach.) Vain. (1927); Caliciella corynella var. subsessile Vain. (1927); Calicium corynellum var. subsessile (Vain.) Zahlbr. (1931)

= Calicium corynellum =

Species of lichen

Calicium corynellum is a species of pin lichen in the family Caliciaceae. It is found scattered across parts of Europe, North America, and Asia, where it grows on rock surfaces in shaded and humid locations.

== Taxonomy ==
The species was first formally described by Swedish lichenologist Erik Acharius as Lichen corynellus. He transferred it to the genus Calicium in 1803. Edvard August Vainio proposed a new genus for it, Caliciella, in 1927. Leif Tibell documented Acharius' type specimens and designated a lectotype from this material in 1987. Historically, there were uncertainties as to whether the species was a lichen, or a lichenicolous (lichen-dwelling) fungus.

The classification of Calicium corynellum as a distinct species was confirmed in 2020. Researchers conducted a study to investigate its taxonomic status, given previous uncertainties surrounding its identity. A molecular phylogenetics analysis based on nuclear rDNA sequences from a broader sample size underscored the genetic difference between C. corynellum and C. viride. The study thus consolidated C. corynellum as a distinct species in the Caliciaceae, in spite of its resemblance to C. viride.

== Description ==
Calicium corynellum has specific morphological characteristics that set it apart from Calicium viride. The ascomata (fruiting bodies) of C. corynellum, are greyish white and has shorter stalks. It has narrow spores, a feature distinct from C. viride, which are broader. The thallus (the vegetative tissue of lichens) of C. corynellum is of a leprose type, contrasting the granular to verrucose thallus of C. viride.

In terms of chemical components, C. corynellum contains rhizocarpic and usnic acids. Although C. viride also contains rhizocarpic acid, it features epanorin instead of usnic acid. However, the concentration of these acids varies significantly in both species, making this factor less reliable for distinguishing between them.

== Habitat, distribution, and ecology ==
Found scattered across parts of Europe, North America, and Asia, Calicium corynellum prefers specific environmental conditions. Unlike most calicioid lichens, C. corynellum favours rock surfaces, primarily siliceous rocks, found in shaded and humid locations. This preference for rocky habitats differentiates it from many others in the same genus that grow on trees or soil, but also highlights its vulnerability to changes in its microenvironment, such as alterations in humidity and shading due to ecological changes or human activities. Ongoing evaluations for inclusion in the red list of lichens in Spain and Portugal emphasise the need for careful monitoring and conservation measures.

Much like other lichen species, Calicium corynellum is integral to the ecosystems it inhabits. As a primary coloniser, it plays a role in soil formation by breaking down rock surfaces and incorporating organic matter into the mineral substrate. Its ability to fix atmospheric nitrogen also enriches the nutrient content of the surrounding environment.

Lichens such as C. corynellum can indicate environmental health and air quality, as they are highly sensitive to air pollutants. By monitoring its presence or absence of these sensitive species, scientists can gauge the level of pollutants and inform environmental policies.
