= Calicium victorianum =

Scientific classification
- Domain: Eukaryota
- Kingdom: Fungi
- Division: Ascomycota
- Class: Lecanoromycetes
- Order: Caliciales
- Family: Caliciaceae
- Genus: Calicium
- Species: C. victorianum

Binomial name
- Calicium victorianum (F.Wilson) Tibell (1987)

Synonyms
- Trachylia victoriana F.Wilson (1889); Cyphelium victorianum (F.Wilson) Zahlbr. (1922); Calicium piperatum F.Wilson (1891); Calicium obconicum Müll.Arg. (1896); Calicium victorianum var. desidiosum Tibell (1987)

Species of lichen

Calicium victorianum is a lichen-forming fungus in the family Caliciaceae. This tiny lichen is almost invisible to the naked eye, living inside weathered wood and producing minute, bell-shaped fruiting bodies that look like dark specks on the surface. Originally discovered in Australia in 1889 growing on Eucalyptus fence posts, it specialises in colonising hard, sun-exposed wood that has been naturally weathered. The species has an unusual distribution, being found in Australia, New Zealand, and also at a single site in southern England, making it one of the few lichens with such a widely scattered range between the Southern and Northern Hemispheres.

== Taxonomy ==
Calicium victorianum was first introduced by the Victorian botanist Frederick Wilson in 1889 under the name Trachylia victoriana, based on specimens growing on weather-beaten Eucalyptus palings in south-eastern Australia. Two years later Wilson described Calicium piperatum from the same district; modern study of the type material shows the two names apply to a single species. Subsequent combinations in Cyphelium and Calicium were proposed, but it was Leif Tibell's 1987 monograph that settled the current placement and listed an additional synonym, Calicium obconicum. The species belongs to the pin-lichen family Caliciaceae within the order Lecanorales. Tibell recognised two subspecies: subsp. victorianum, with slightly stalked ascomata and smaller spores, and subsp. desidiosum, in which the fruiting bodies are almost sessile and the spores larger and more finely ornamented.

Molecular work on nuclear internal transcribed spacer rDNA sequences places C. victorianum in the "Clade I" assemblage of Calicium, adjoining C. tricolor and the Himalayan C. pyriforme. Although support values are weak, the clade is distinguished chemically: unlike many in the genus it lacks xanthones and instead accumulates the depsidone compound physodalic acid, a compound otherwise rare in the Caliciaceae.

== Description ==
The lichen itself is almost invisible: its main body (thallus) lives inside weathered wood (endoxylic), forming a film barely 0.2 mm thick. Within this layer the fungal filaments partner minute green algae (a chlorococcoid photobiont), the two together eking out an existence on the nutrient-poor surface of old posts and trunks.

Reproduction takes place in minute, bell-shaped fruiting bodies (ascomata) that sit almost directly on the wood. Each structure measures roughly 0.2–0.4 mm across and no more than 0.1 mm tall, so a hand lens is needed to see them clearly. The wall (exciple) is dark brown to black and carbonised, while the interior is filled with a loose, powdery mass of mature spores (mazaedium) that looks sooty brown in reflected light. Slender, cylindrical spore sacs (asci) soon disintegrate, releasing eight spores each. When fresh the spores are pale and single-celled; at maturity they darken, develop a single cross-wall and acquire a coat of tiny warts, ending up 11–13 μm long by 4–6 μm wide.

Chemical analysis of individual ascomata shows a single dominant substance—physodalic acid—whereas the xanthones common in many pin lichens are absent. The compound is not detectable with simple spot tests, making thin-layer or HPLC analysis necessary for confirmation.

== Habitat and distribution ==
Calicium victorianum is a specialist of hard, exposed wood. In its native Australasian range it grows on old Eucalyptus fence posts and stumps and, in New Zealand, on the durable heartwood of Nothofagus. The British population discovered in 1999 occupies the north-facing sides of weathered oak posts in an ancient woodland clearing in West Sussex, sharing the habitat with other sunlit pin lichens such as Chaenotheca ferruginea. The species favours positions fully open to sun and rain, where competing mosses and algae are kept at bay by desiccation.

Long thought to be confined to Australia and New Zealand, the find in southern England represents its first record in Europe and establishes a disjunct distribution between temperate Australasia and a single lowland site in the Northern Hemisphere. Whether the British population is a recent import on sawn timber or a relict overlooked by earlier lichenologists remains uncertain, but its occurrence shows that suitable microhabitats for this tiny wood-dweller can arise far from its putative centre of origin.
