= Calicium laevigatum =

Scientific classification
- Domain: Eukaryota
- Kingdom: Fungi
- Division: Ascomycota
- Class: Lecanoromycetes
- Order: Caliciales
- Family: Caliciaceae
- Genus: Calicium
- Species: C. laevigatum

Binomial name
- Calicium laevigatum Tibell (2006)

Species of pin-lichen

Calicium laevigatum is a corticolous (bark-dwelling) pin lichen in the family Caliciaceae, recognised by its greenish-grey, warted thallus, slender black stalks that carry brown-pruinose heads, and ascospores ornamented with a striking spiral ridge when young. It produces alectorialic acid as its principal secondary metabolite, a chemistry otherwise unknown in the genus, and molecular data place it as an early-diverging member of the Calicium viride clade.

The species shows a pronounced bi-hemispheric disjunction: in the central Himalayas it inhabits cool, moist mixed oak–conifer forests between about 2,950 and 3,250 m elevation, whereas in south-western Western Australia it grows at 115–285 m on the lower trunks of eucalypts and dead banksias in seasonally wet jarrah–karri woodlands.

== Taxonomy ==
The Swedish lichenologist Leif Tibell described the species in 2007 from material collected near the treeline in Uttarakhand, India. The type specimen was taken at an elevation of 3,000 m (9,800 ft) on the north-western flank of Kukin Khal, where the trunks of Quercus semecarpifolia and associated conifers support a rich corticolous lichen funga.

DNA sequence data from the internal transcribed spacer region place C. laevigatum in the Calicium viride clade, but on a comparatively long branch, indicating an early divergence within the group. Chemically, the fungus produces alectorialic acid as its principal secondary metabolite, accompanied by minor amounts of barbatolic, hypoalectorialic and norstictic acids—an otherwise unique combination in the genus. The species epithet laevigatum ('smoothed') alludes to the thin gelatinous coat that gives the stipe a polished appearance.

== Description ==
The vegetative body (thallus) forms a thin, greenish-grey crust in which the photobiont alga is immersed. Its surface is broken into densely packed warts (verrucae) 0.2–0.4 mm across that merge into irregular lumps. Chemical spot tests turn the thallus bright yellow then red with potassium hydroxide solution (K+ yellow → red) and orange with para-phenylenediamine (Pd+ orange), reactions that reflect the presence of alectorialic acid derivatives.

The reproductive structures are typical "pins": a narrow black stalk (stipe) 1.5–1.8 mm high and 0.12–0.16 mm thick that supports a rounded spore mass (capitulum) 0.34–0.52 mm in diameter. Unlike many others in the genus, the stipe lacks a pale, powdery bloom, whereas the underside of the capitulum is dusted with a distinct brown pruina that turns crimson and crystallises when touched with alkali. A microscopic collar is sometimes visible where stalk and head meet.

Inside each fruit body the asci are cylindrical (36–39 × 3–4 μm) and line up their eight ascospores in a single row. Fresh spores are broadly ellipsoid, 10–12 × 5.0–5.5 μm, and carry a pronounced spiral ridge; in maturity the ridges flatten into an irregular network separated by narrow cracks. The excipulum—the wall surrounding the spore mass—is 35–55 μm thick and built of heavily darkened, thick-walled cells, while the supporting tissue (hypothecium) is chestnut brown and gently domed.

== Habitat and distribution ==
Calicium laevigatum was first reported from the central Himalayas, where it inhabits cool, moist old-growth forests between about 2950 and 3250 m elevation. It grows on the bark of living Himalayan oak (Quercus semecarpifolia) and at the bases of Abies pindrow trunks; one Bhutanese collection shows that it can also colonise the durable bark of Tsuga. These sites are characteristically mixed oak–conifer stands with a rhododendron understorey, where frequent cloud immersion and monsoonal moisture supply the humidity favoured by many pin lichens.

In 2006 fieldwork revealed that the species also occurs in south-western Western Australia, more than 9000 km from its Himalayan range. The Australian populations grow much lower—between 115 and 285 m elevation—on the lower trunks of Eucalyptus in open eucalypt woodland and on dead Banksia in seasonally swampy areas along the Donnelly and Warren rivers.
