= Calicium episcalare =

Scientific classification
- Kingdom: Fungi
- Division: Ascomycota
- Class: Lecanoromycetes
- Order: Caliciales
- Family: Caliciaceae
- Genus: Calicium
- Species: C. episcalare

Binomial name
- Calicium episcalare Tibell & T.Knutsson (2016)

Species of lichen

Calicium episcalare is a rare species of pin lichen that is known from only a single locality in Sweden. It is in the family Caliciaceae. It one of the few Calicium species that is parasitic on another lichen. The type was found growing on the north-facing wall of an old wooden barn in Dalsland. The barn, which dates to the 17th century, was made from old pine wood and had likely never been painted. The specific epithet episcalare refers to the name of the host, Hypocenomyce scalaris, a common and widespread lichen. Calicium episcalare was described as a new species in 2016 by Swedish lichenologists Leif Tibell and Tommy Knutsson.

== Description ==
Calicium episcalaris has a distinct black colouration devoid of pruina (a white, waxy coating), making the lichen's surface appear smooth and unblemished. The fruiting bodies, which carry the spore-producing parts, are relatively small, ranging from 0.26 to 0.37 mm in height. The cap of the fruiting body, or capitulum, has a shape varying from lenticular (lens-like) to broadly conical, measuring between 0.22 and 0.26 mm in diameter. The edge of the capitulum's outer layer, known as the excipulum, often becomes thinner and paler towards the edges, creating the illusion of a narrow, frosty covering.

The supporting stalk of the lichen is narrow, typically between 0.10 and 0.15 mm wide. The asci (spore-producing structures) are cylindrical, measuring 42 to 46 micrometres (μm) in length and 5.5 to 6.5 μm in width, containing spores arranged in a single row. The spores themselves are broadly ellipsoid in shape, ranging from 10 to 14 μm in length and 6 to 8 μm in width. They are distinguished by a minutely verrucose, or warty, surface and have a few irregular cracks.
