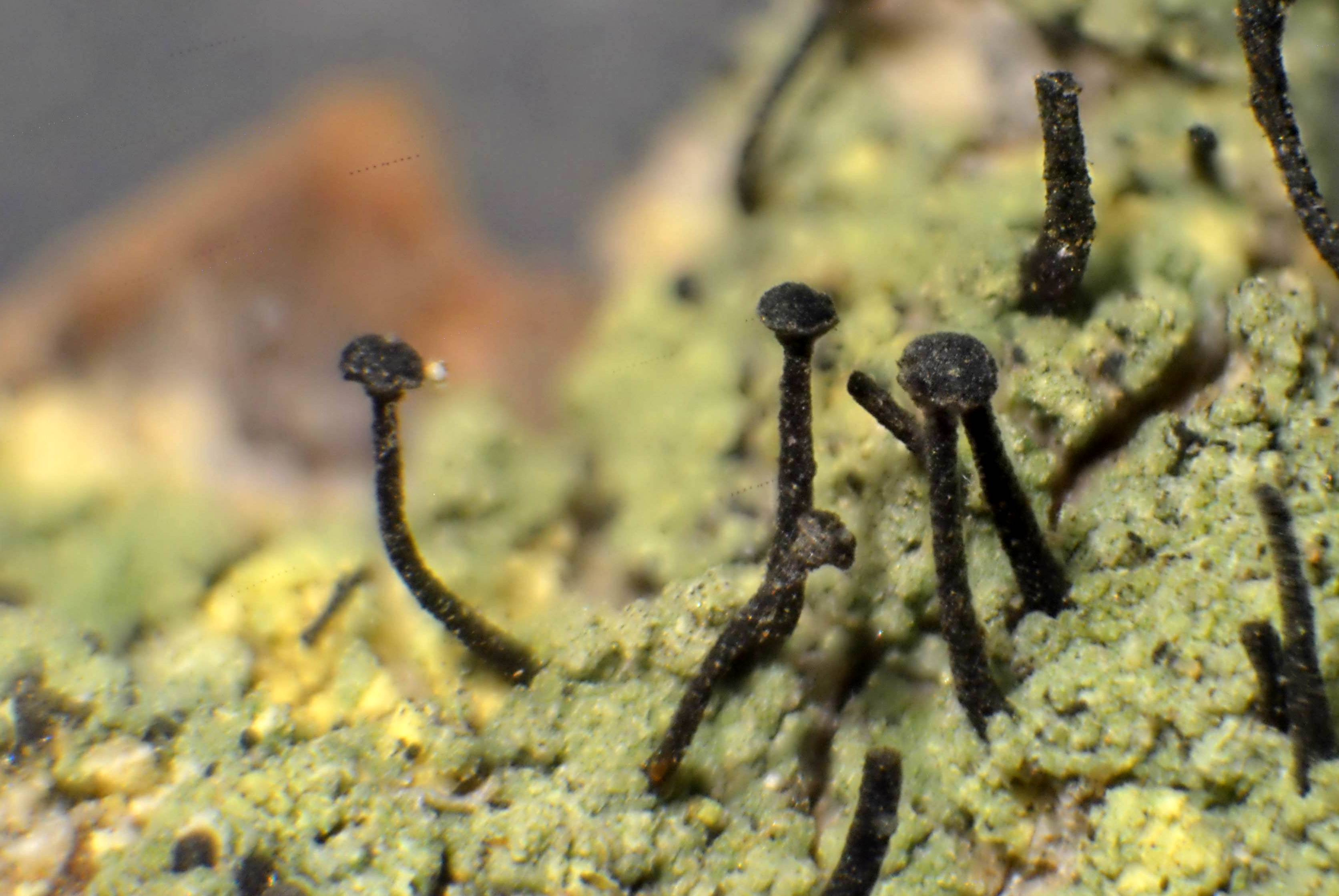

Conservation status
- Apparently Secure (NatureServe)

Scientific classification
- Kingdom: Fungi
- Division: Ascomycota
- Class: Lecanoromycetes
- Order: Caliciales
- Family: Caliciaceae
- Genus: Calicium
- Species: C. viride

Binomial name
- Calicium viride Pers. (1794)

Synonyms
- List: Lichen lygodes Ach. (1799); Coniocybe stemonea b viride (Pers.) Rabenh. (1870); Calicium hyperellum f. viride (Pers.) Cromb. (1894); Chaenotheca stemonea f. viridis (Pers.) Zahlbr. (1922); Lichen hyperellus Ach. (1799); Calicium hyperellum (Ach.) Ach. (1803); Phacotrum hyperellum (Ach.) Gray (1821); Calicium viride f. hyperellum (Ach.) Vain. (1927); Calicium lygodes (Ach.) Ach. (1803); Calicium hyperellum var. lygodes (Ach.) Ach. (1808); Calicium hyperellum f. lygodes (Ach.) Branth (1868); Calicium baliolum Ach. (1803); Calicium hyperellum var. baliolum (Ach.) Wahlenb. (1812); Calicium hyperellum f. baliolum (Ach.) Ach. (1814); Calicium viride var. baliolum (Ach.) Oxner (1956); Calicium viride f. leprosa Nádv. (1940)

= Calicium viride =

Species of pin lichen

Calicium viride, commonly known as the green stubble lichen, is a species of pin lichen in the family Caliciaceae, and the type species of the genus Calicium. It is a common and widely distributed species in temperate areas of the Northern Hemisphere and southern South America. The thallus of the lichen consists of a basal crust, and apothecia (fruiting bodies) on a stalk. Diagnostic characteristics of Calicium viride are its brown excipulum (the ring of tissue around its apothecia), and its green, granular crust.

== Taxonomy ==
It was described as a new species by Christiaan Hendrik Persoon in 1794. Calcium viride is the type species of the genus Calicium. A common name for the lichen in North America is "green stubble lichen". Another name that has been used is "frog stubble".

The Calicium viride group is the name of a clade of closely related species that all have ascomata supported on relatively large and sturdy stalks, and spores with a distinctive spiral ornamentation. This group also includes C. corynellum, C. salicinum, and C. quercinum, as well as Cyphelium lecideinum, which lacks a stalk but also has spiral-striated spores.

Historically, Calicium viride was often confused with Calicium corynellum due to their superficial morphological similarities. The taxonomic relationship between the two species has been clarified through molecular phylogenetics analyses using nuclear ITS DNA sequences, which confirmed that these two taxa are distinct. This distinction was supported by their formation of separate monophyletic groups in the analyses. Morphological differences are significant, with C. corynellum characterised by short-stalked, greyish-white pruinose ascomata and narrower spores, in contrast to the long stalks and brown pruina of C. viride. This clear differentiation supports the treatment of C. corynellum and C. viride as separate species in taxonomic and conservation contexts.

== Description ==
Calicium viride has a greenish-yellow thallus with a granular texture that grows as a crust on the surface of its substrate. The small black stalks, 1.5–2.5 mm long and roughly 0.1–0.15 mm thick, support the spore-bearing structures (apothecia): at the tip of each stalk is a capitulum–a spherical apothecium. In general, the height of the apothecia is about 9–16 times greater than the central stalk width. The capitula are black with a brownish underside. The ascospores are brown, and have an elliptical shape with a single internal septum that divides the spore into two cells. The spores measure 12–14 by 6–7 μm.

It contains the secondary chemicals (lichen products) rhizocarpic acid and epanorin.

=== Similar species ===
Calicium corynellum is a rarer species that is somewhat similar in appearance to C. viride, but it grows on rock instead of wood or bark, and it has shorter stalks, typically 0.5–0.6 mm long. In distinguishing Calicium viride from Calicium corynellum, notable differences arise in their morphological characteristics. Calicium viride typically presents with longer stalks and a brown pruina covering its ascomata, which are usually greenish at maturity. In contrast, Calicium corynellum features shorter, sometimes almost sessile ascomata with a greyish-white pruina, and consistently smaller spores measuring 13–17 by 4–5 μm compared to the 15–21 by 4–6 μm spores of C. viride. These distinctions are needed for accurate field identification, particularly in their shared habitats.

== Habitat and distribution ==
Calicium viride is common on the bark and wood of conifer trees in montane forests, but sometimes grows on deciduous trees. It prefers bark that is weakly acidic to neutral. Chaenotheca trichialis is a frequent lichen associate. In Nepal, Calicium viride has been reported from 3,000 to 3,300 m elevation in a compilation of published records.
