= Nádvorník =

Nádvorník is a Slovak name for the Palatine of Hungary. It is also a surname. Notable people with the surname include:

- Josef Nádvorník (1906–1977), Czech biologist
- Roman Nádvorník (born 1973), Czech football manager
