= Calicium carolinianum =

Conservation status
- Imperiled (NatureServe)

Scientific classification
- Domain: Eukaryota
- Kingdom: Fungi
- Division: Ascomycota
- Class: Lecanoromycetes
- Order: Caliciales
- Family: Caliciaceae
- Genus: Calicium
- Species: C. carolinianum

Binomial name
- Calicium carolinianum (Tuck.) M.Prieto & Wedin (2016)

Synonyms
- Acolium carolinianum Tuck. (1872); Cyphelium carolinianum (Tuck.) Zahlbr. (1903); Thelomma carolinianum (Tuck.) Tibell (1976)

Species of lichen

Calicium carolinianum is a species of lichen in the family Caliciaceae. It is endemic to the Gulf Coastal Plain region of the United States. The lichen contains norstictic acid, and has ascospores that measure 13–17 by 8–9 μm.

== Taxonomy ==
The lichen was originally described as Acolium carolinianum by American botanist Edward Tuckerman in 1872. He discovered it in South Carolina, after which the species is named. Leif Tibell transferred it to the genus Thelomma in 1976. In 2016, Maria Prieto and Mats Wedin proposed a transfer to the genus Calicium, "until molecular investigations can clarify its position".
