= Calicium pleuriseptatum =

Scientific classification
- Kingdom: Fungi
- Division: Ascomycota
- Class: Lecanoromycetes
- Order: Caliciales
- Family: Caliciaceae
- Genus: Calicium
- Species: C. pleuriseptatum

Binomial name
- Calicium pleuriseptatum Tibell & Frisch (2010)

Species of lichen-forming fungus

Calicium pleuriseptatum is a species of pin lichen in the family Caliciaceae. It was described as a new species in 2010 by Leif Tibell and Andreas Frisch. It is found in Tanzania, where it grows on bark-dwelling bryophytes in open forest.
