= Xanthoparmelia nanoides =

Scientific classification
- Kingdom: Fungi
- Division: Ascomycota
- Class: Lecanoromycetes
- Order: Lecanorales
- Family: Parmeliaceae
- Genus: Xanthoparmelia
- Species: X. nanoides

Binomial name
- Xanthoparmelia nanoides Elix (2003)
- Holotype: Albany, Western Australia

Species of foliose lichen

Xanthoparmelia nanoides is a species of saxicolous (rock-dwelling), foliose lichen in the family Parmeliaceae, described by John Elix in 2003. This species is endemic to Western Australia and known only from its type locality near Albany.

== Taxonomy ==
Xanthoparmelia nanoides is part of the large genus Xanthoparmelia, which includes lichens known for their leaf-like (foliose) thalli that closely adhere to rock surfaces. This species was identified as unique due to its specific chemical makeup and morphological characteristics, distinguishing it from similar species such as Xanthoparmelia nana.

== Description ==
The thallus of Xanthoparmelia nanoides is foliose (leafy) and can grow up to 10 cm (3.9 in) wide. It is adnate to tightly adnate, meaning it closely adheres to its substrate. The lobes of the thallus are contiguous to slightly overlapping, flat, and range from 0.5 to 2.0 mm wide, often showing more or less dichotomous branching. The upper surface is yellow-green, turning darker with age, and is shiny at the tips but becomes rugulose (wrinkled) and cracked over time.

The medulla, or internal layer of the lichen, is mostly white but shows intermittent orange-red pigmentation in the lower sections. The lower surface of the thallus is smooth, pale brown, darkening at the tips, with sparse to moderately dense dark brown rhizines.

Reproductive structures include sessile to slightly stalked apothecia (fruiting bodies) that are 1–3 mm wide with a dark brown to black disc. The spores are ellipsoid, measuring 8–9 by 5–6 μm.

Chemical spot tests on the lichen show no reaction to potassium hydroxide (K−) on the cortex, but it is K+ (yellow to dark red) in the medulla, and is P+ (orange-red). The lichen's chemical profile includes usnic acid, norstictic acid, diffractaic acid, and minor amounts of skyrin, among others.

== Habitat and distribution ==
Xanthoparmelia nanoides has been found exclusively at its type locality on granite rocks in a heathy, dry sclerophyll forest within the Monadnocks Nature Reserve near Albany, Western Australia. It grows in an exposed environment, highlighting its adaptation to harsh, sunny conditions.

== See also ==
- List of Xanthoparmelia species
