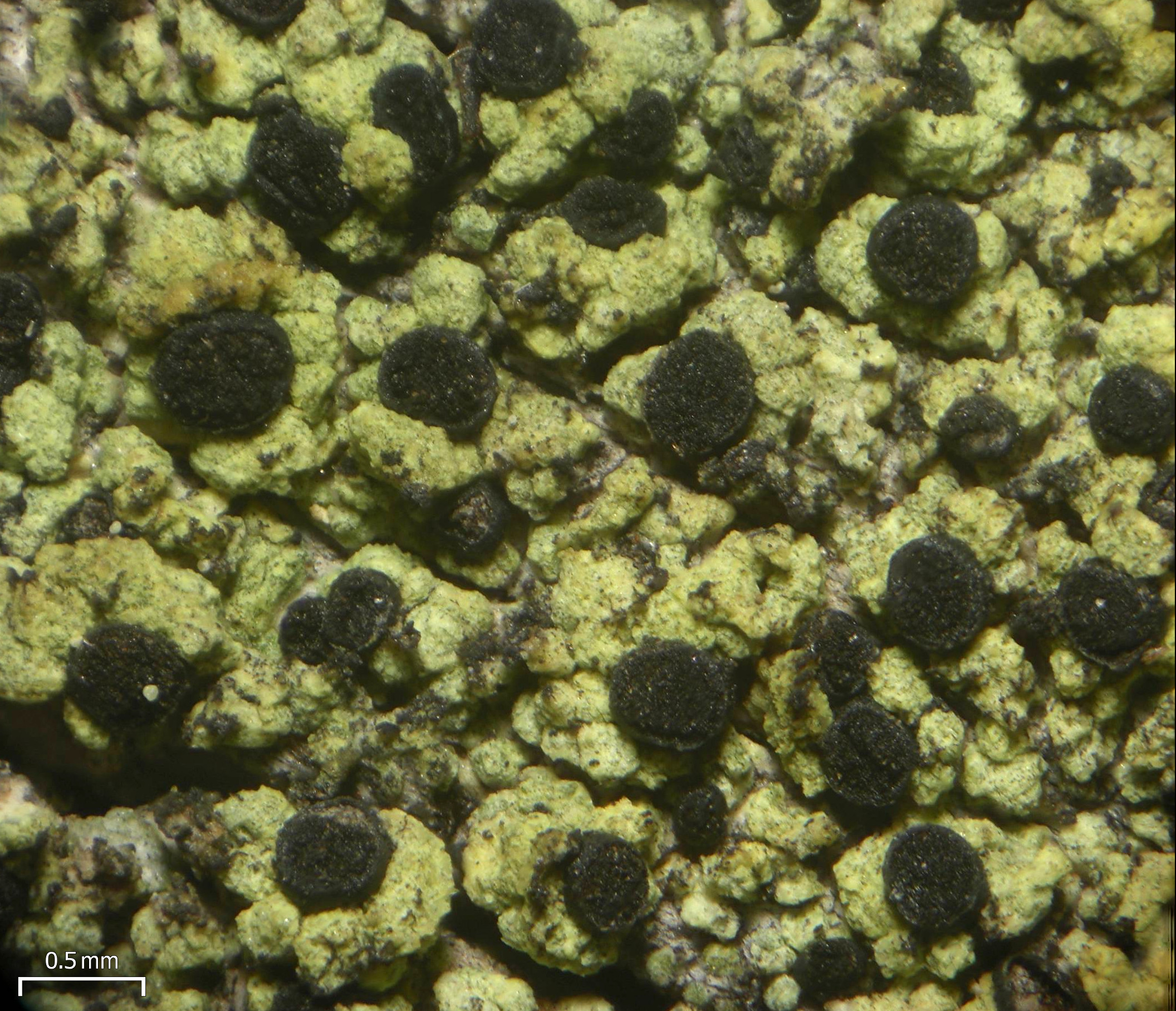

Scientific classification
- Domain: Eukaryota
- Kingdom: Fungi
- Division: Ascomycota
- Class: Lecanoromycetes
- Order: Caliciales
- Family: Caliciaceae
- Genus: Calicium
- Species: C. pinicola

Binomial name
- Calicium pinicola (Tibell) M.Prieto & Wedin (2016)

Synonyms
- Cyphelium pinicola Tibell (1969)

= Calicium pinicola =

Species of lichen

Calicium pinicola is a species of lignicolous (wood-dwelling), crustose lichen in the family Caliciaceae. It is widely distributed in Europe, and also occurs in the United States.

== Taxonomy ==
The lichen was first formally described as new to science in 1969 by Swedish lichenologist Leif Tibell, as Cyphelium pinicola. Maria Prieto and Mats Wedin transferred it to the genus Calicium in 2016 following a molecular phylogenetics study of the Caliciaceae-Physciaceae clade.

== Description ==
Calicium pinicola has a yellowish-green, warty (verrucose) thallus that is quite thin and sometimes partially immersed in the substrate. Its apothecia are black, sessile with a partial constriction at the base, and measure 0.4–0.6 mm in diameter. The ascospores, which number eight per ascus are ellipsoid with a single septum, and measure 13–17 by 7–9 μm.

Calicium pinicola contains rhizocarpic acid, a lichen product that presents as small yellow crystals in the cortex).

== Distribution ==
Calicium pinicola grows on decorticated wood, particularly that of Pinus sylvestris, but it has also been recorded on Betula and Larix. A preferred microhabitat is the dead twigs of living pine trees.

In Switzerland, Calicium pinicola is threatened with extinction, and it has been categorised as vulnerable in Italy. Other countries from which it has been reported include Austria, Macedonia, the United States, Turkey, and Kandalaksha in Arctic Russia.
