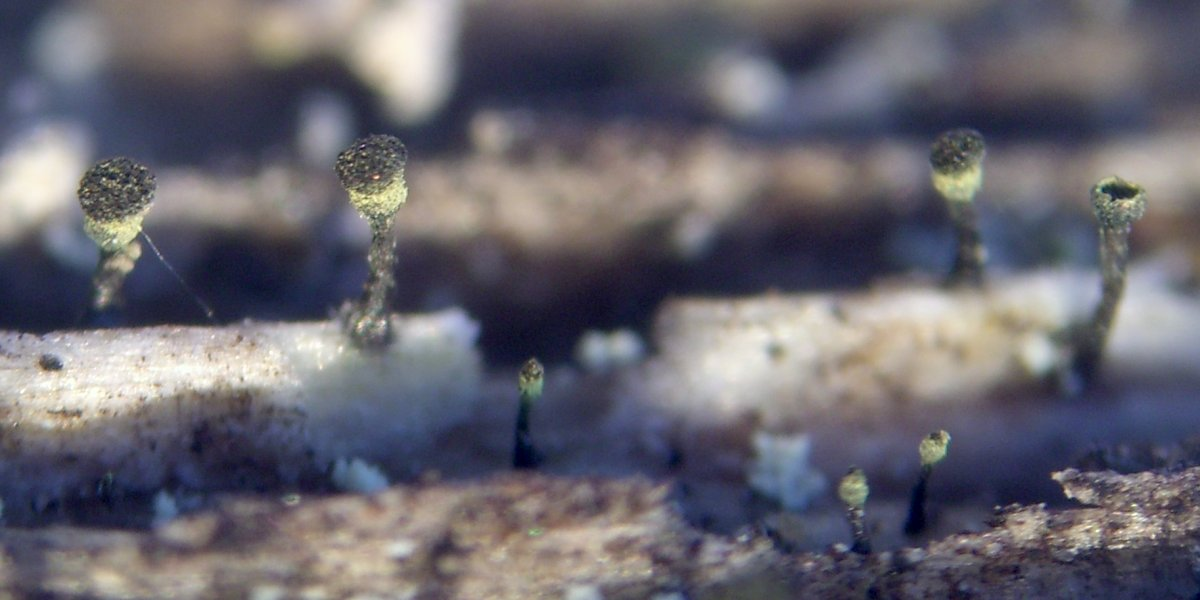

Conservation status
- Apparently Secure (NatureServe)

Scientific classification
- Domain: Eukaryota
- Kingdom: Fungi
- Division: Ascomycota
- Class: Lecanoromycetes
- Order: Caliciales
- Family: Caliciaceae
- Genus: Calicium
- Species: C. trabinellum

Binomial name
- Calicium trabinellum (Ach.) Ach. (1803)

Synonyms
- Calicium xylonellum ß trabinellum Ach. (1803); Lichen trabinellus Sm. (1806); Calicium roscidum var. trabinellum (Ach.) Schaer. (1821); Phacotrum trabinellum (Sm.) Gray (1821); Chaenotheca trabinella (Sm.) A.L.Sm. (1918)

= Calicium trabinellum =

Species of lichen

Calicium trabinellum, commonly known as the yellow-collar stubble lichen, is a widespread species of pin lichen in the family Caliciaceae. It was first described by Swedish lichenologist Erik Acharius in 1803 as Calicium xylonellum ß trabinellum. He made the new combination Calicium trabinellum in a later chapter of the same publication.

The thallus of the lichen is usually visible as a stain on the wood upon which it is growing. The apothecium resembles a small black pin, with a stalk 0.5–0.9 mm (0.02–0.04 in) tall, holding a black mound of ascospores (called a mazaedium). The underside of the mazaedium is dusted with pruina, which contains the compound vulpinic acid that gives it its yellow colour. The spores of Calicium trabinellum have roughly textured walls and measure 7–10 by 4–6 μm.

The lichen is common on dead wood in boreal and hemiboreal forests. In addition to Europe and North America, Calicium trabinellum has been recorded from Africa and Asia.
