= Tibellia =

Scientific classification
- Kingdom: Fungi
- Division: Ascomycota
- Class: Lecanoromycetes
- Order: Lecanorales
- Family: Ramalinaceae
- Genus: Tibellia; Vězda & Hafellner (1992)
- Species: T. dimerelloides

Binomial name
- Tibellia dimerelloides Vězda & Hafellner (1992)

Single-species fungal genus

Tibellia is a fungal genus in the family Ramalinaceae. It is a monospecific genus, containing the single species Tibellia dimerelloides, a byssoid lichen. This unusual lichen forms loose, cotton-wool-like masses up to 20 cm across on tree bark in Queensland's rainforests, making it unique among its family which typically forms crusty patches. It is known only from two locations in northeastern Australia and is named after the Swedish lichenologist Leif Tibell.

== Taxonomy ==
Tibellia is a monospecific genus in the family Ramalinaceae, order Lecanorales. The genus was established in 1992 by the lichenologists Antonín Vězda and Josef Hafellner to accommodate a single species, Tibellia dimerelloides, discovered in subtropical rainforests of Queensland, Australia. Within the Bacidiaceae, Tibellia is distinguished by its byssoid (wooly) thallus organisation, representing the first and only member of this family to have such thread-like, cotton-wool morphology rather than the typical crustose growth forms characteristic of other related genera. The genus is named after the Swedish lichenologist Leif Tibell.

The type species Tibellia dimerelloides was described from collections made at Lamington National Park and Atherton Tableland in Queensland. The species epithet dimerelloides" reflects its morphological similarity to species in the genus Dimerella, though the distinctive byssoid thallus structure and other diagnostic features clearly separate it taxonomically. As a member of the Lecanorales, Tibellia belongs to one of the largest orders of lichenised ascomycetes, though its unique morphological characteristics within the Bacidiaceae suggest a specialised evolutionary adaptation to its rainforest bark substrate habitat.

== Description ==
Tibellia dimerelloides forms distinctive loose, thread-like masses resembling cotton wool or fine fibres, a growth form known as byssoid that distinguishes it from most other lichens in the Bacidiaceae family. The thallus (the main body of the lichen) is expansive and continuous, reaching up to 20 cm in diameter, with a pale greyish to greenish colouration and a slightly yellowish marginal zone at the edges. The fibrous structure is composed of densely interwoven fungal threads (hyphae) measuring 3–5 micrometres (μm) thick, which create the characteristic cotton-like texture that gives the species its distinctive appearance on tree bark surfaces.

The reproductive structures (apothecia) are small disc-shaped fruiting bodies that appear scattered across the thallus surface, measuring 0.5–1.1 mm in diameter with flat, brownish discs surrounded by slightly raised, whitish margins. These apothecia contain microscopic sac-like structures (asci) that house the spores, which are colourless, elliptical to nearly oblong in shape, and measure 10–14 by 3–3.5 μm. The species produces atranorin, a secondary metabolite commonly found in lichens that can be detected through laboratory analysis and helps confirm identification. Unlike many crustose lichens that form tight, crusty patches, Tibellia dimerelloides creates loosely organised, easily detached masses that occupy the space between other plant materials on bark surfaces in its rainforest habitat.

== Habitat and distribution ==
Tibellia dimerelloides is known only from Queensland, Australia, where it has been collected from two locations in subtropical and tropical rainforest environments. The type specimen was found at Lamington National Park, roughly 13 kilometres southwest of Beechmont, growing along the Blue Pool Track in subtropical rainforest. A second collection was made from Atherton Tableland at Crater Lake, situated 18 kilometres south of Atherton at an elevation of 900 metres, also within rainforest habitat.

The species is corticolous, meaning it grows exclusively on the bark of trees, where it forms its characteristic loose, fibrous masses. The specific rainforest conditions of high humidity and stable temperatures appear to be essential for the development of its distinctive byssoid growth form. Based on current knowledge, Tibellia dimerelloides appears to be endemic to the rainforest regions of northeastern Australia, though its limited collection history suggests it may be either genuinely rare or potentially overlooked due to its unusual morphology that differs markedly from typical crustose lichens in the same family.
