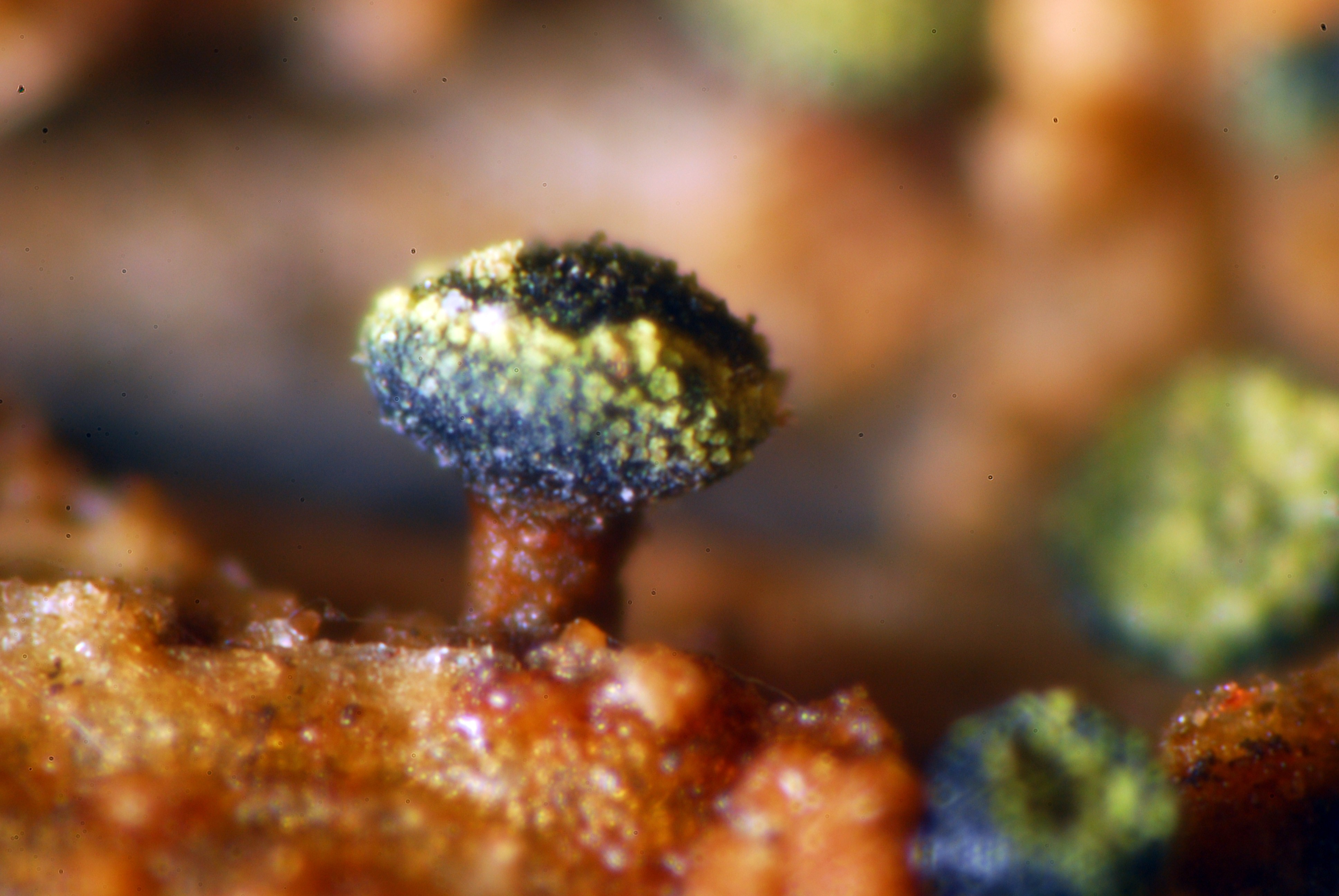

Conservation status
- Vulnerable (NatureServe)

Scientific classification
- Kingdom: Fungi
- Division: Ascomycota
- Class: Lecanoromycetes
- Order: Caliciales
- Family: Caliciaceae
- Genus: Calicium
- Species: C. adspersum

Binomial name
- Calicium adspersum Pers. (1798)

Synonyms
- List: Calicium claviculare var. roscidum Ach. (1803); Calicium hyperellum var. roscidum (Ach.) Ach. (1808); Calicium lygodes var. roscidum (Ach.) Lam. (1813); Calicium hyperellum f. roscidum (Ach.) Ach. (1814); Calicium roscidum (Ach.) Ach. (1816); Calicium mutabile var. roscidum (Ach.) Ach. (1817); Phacotrum hyperellum var. roscidum (Ach.) Gray (1821); Calicium clavellare var. roscidum (Ach.) Wahlenb. (1826); Calicium adspersum var. roscidum (Ach.) Schaer. (1833)

= Calicium adspersum =

Species of lichen-forming fungus

Calicium adspersum is a species of pin lichen in the family Caliciaceae. It forms grey, granular crusts on bark and dead wood, producing black, pin-like fruiting bodies about 0.6–1 mm tall with a yellowish, powdery coating on the head. It was described by Christiaan Hendrik Persoon in 1798 from material on oak wood, and later authors applied a series of alternative names and rank placements to the same taxon in the early 19th century. The species has an antitropical distribution, occurring in temperate regions of both hemispheres, but is generally uncommon and is especially scarce in North America, where few verified collections are known. A Tasmanian subspecies, C. adspersum subsp. australe, differs in its thinner thallus and smaller, grey spores with oblique ridges. Two other subspecies have been described, including one from the Himalayas of India. Under the microscope the species has spirally ridged ascospores and also produces tiny asexual spores (conidia) that can germinate and form fungal colonies in laboratory culture. NatureServe ranks the species as globally vulnerable, linking its decline mainly to the loss and fragmentation of old-growth forest habitat and noting that it may be slow to recover because suitable host trees take many decades to develop.

== Taxonomy ==
Calicium adspersum was described by Christiaan Hendrik Persoon in 1798, in his Icones et descriptiones fungorum minus cognitorum. In the original Latin diagnosis, Persoon characterised it as a gregarious, stalked species with a thick, entirely black fruiting body "sprinkled" with green powder, and reported it as growing (not uncommonly) on oak wood, where it is associated with a powdery or darkening crust. Persoon also recorded variation in the stalk length, from very short (so that the cups appear almost sessile) to about 1–2 lines (about 2–4 mm) long, and described the cup as black beneath and somewhat funnel-shaped. He wrote that the disc could be flat or convex and wrinkled, but that it is always dusted with a rather coarse olive-green powder that separates it from similar species; he even speculated about whether this powder is an intrinsic part of the fungus or an external deposit or parasitic growth, concluding that he could not decide.

Erik Acharius later interpreted Persoon's species as part of a distinct roscidum entity, first publishing it as Calicium claviculare var. roscidum in 1803, and subsequently recombining the same epithet several times under different species concepts and ranks, including C. hyperellum var. roscidum (1808) and f. roscidum (1814), C. lygodes var. roscidum (1813), and C. mutabile var. roscidum (1817). He also raised it to species level as Calicium roscidum in 1816. Samuel Frederick Gray transferred the taxon to Phacotrum in 1821 as Phacotrum hyperellum var. roscidum, and Göran Wahlenberg later returned it to Calicium as C. clavellare var. roscidum (1826). Ludwig Schaerer eventually made the combination Calicium adspersum var. roscidum in 1833. Taken together, these names reflect a long history of shifting circumscriptions and rank (form, variety, and species) around a persistent roscidum morph, even as Persoon's original name, Calicium adspersum, has remained in use for the species.

== Description ==
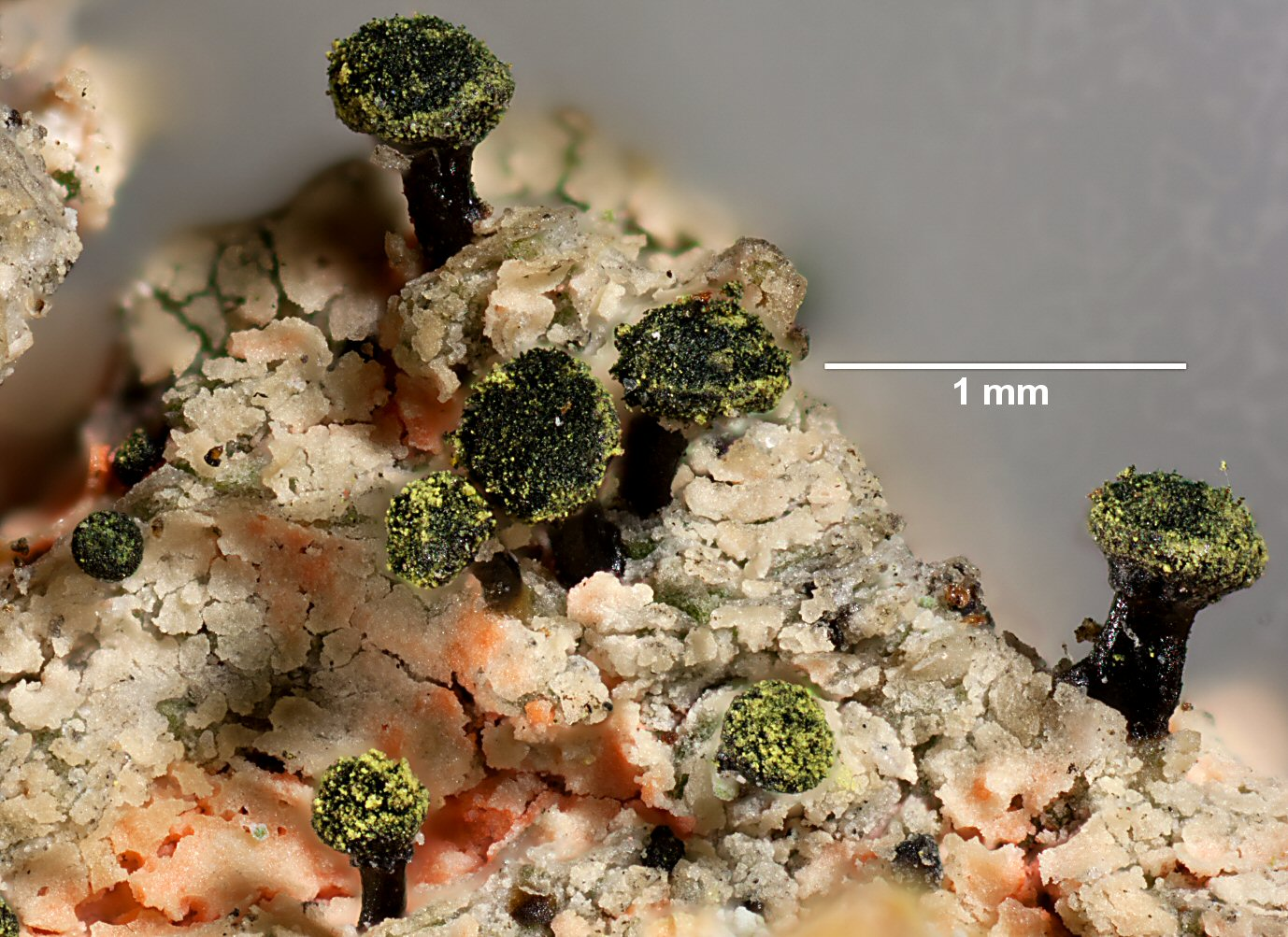
Growing on old Quercus petraea; specimen from Hesse, Germany

The thallus (the main body of the lichen) of Calicium adspersum is grey and granular in texture. It produces black, pin-like apothecia (fruiting bodies) about 0.6–1 mm tall, typically standing three to five times higher than the width of their stalk. The apothecial head is broadly lens-shaped (about 0.3–0.6 mm across), with a yellowish pruina (a powdery surface coating) on the head and along the margin of the exciple (the rim of the fruiting body). The stalk is slender, about 0.1–0.3 mm in diameter. The lichenized fungus associates with a green-algal photobiont in the genus Trebouxia.

Under the microscope, the apothecial stalk is surrounded by a thin, colourless sheath that turns faintly blue in iodine (I+). Microscopically, the asci are club- to cylinder-shaped. The ascospores measure about 13–16 × 5.5–6.5 μm and have spiral (helically arranged) ridges on their surface. In standard spot tests, the thallus reacts K+ (yellow turning red) and Pd+ (yellow-red), consistent with the presence of norstictic acid, while the yellow pruina contains vulpinic acid.

The species also produces asexual spores (conidia) in pycnidia. Vobis reported the conidia as colourless, single-celled and thin-walled, about 2.0–2.2 × 1.2 μm. In laboratory culture on bark-extract agar, the conidia swelled within about a week and later formed germ tubes. After several weeks to months they developed branched hyphae and small mycelial mats, and colonies derived from groups of conidia were maintained for more than a year. These experiments show that the conidia can germinate and produce mycelium under favourable conditions, and may therefore contribute to dispersal of the fungal partner (mycobiont).

=== Subspecies ===
Leif Tibell described the subspecies Calicium adspersum subsp. australe in 1984 from Tasmanian material. Compared with the nominate subspecies, it is characterized by a very thin, whitish-grey thallus and apothecia 0.3–0.7 mm wide that are raised on glossy black stalks typically 1–2.2 mm tall. The ascospores are smaller and grey, measuring 9.8–12 × 4.7–5.5 μm, and bear conspicuous parallel ridges running obliquely across the spore wall. Chemically it is usually associated with norstictic acid, though substances may be undetectable in some specimens (possibly because of the thin thallus), and the yellow pruina contains vulpinic acid; spot tests are reported to be unreliable.

Garima Pant and Dharani Dhar Awasthi described the subspecies Calicium adspersum subsp. himalayense in 1989, from specimens collected in West Bengal, India.

=== Similar species ===
Calicium sequoiae is a close relative of Calicium adspersum in phylogenetic analyses using internal transcribed spacer (ITS) sequences (both fall within Calicium "Clade II"). It can be separated from C. adspersum by a combination of traits reported for C. sequoiae: the stalk tissue is I+ blue (sometimes weakly bluish purple), the apothecia develop a prominent white pruina, and the species produces thamnolic acid as its major secondary metabolite. Ecologically it appears tightly associated with old-growth coast redwood, having been collected only on thick, fibrous bark of large Sequoia sempervirens trunks high above the ground in low-elevation redwood forests of north-western California.

== Habitat and distribution ==
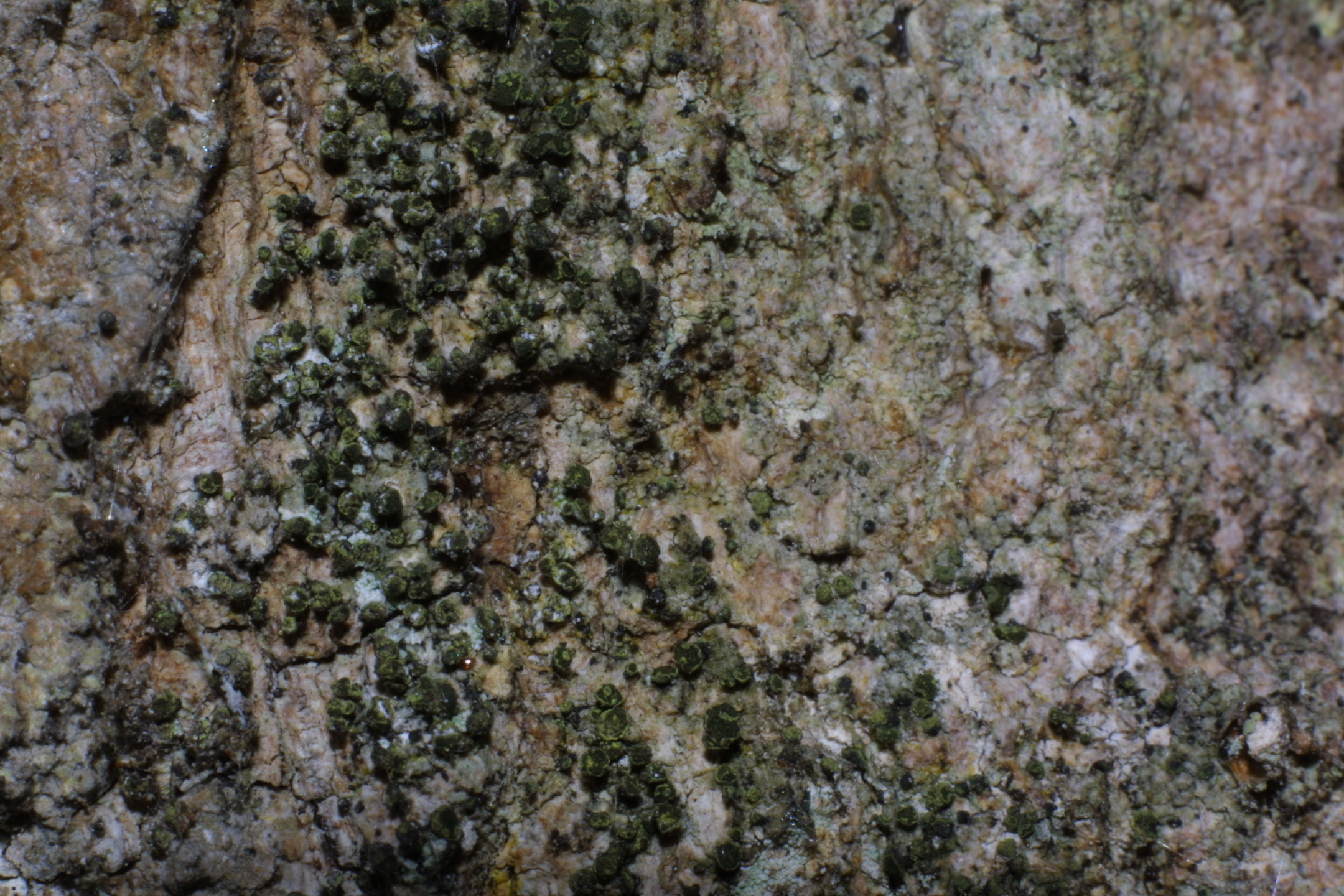
A cluster of fruiting bodies on oak near Stuttgart, Germany

Calicium adspersum has an antitropical distribution, and is widespread in temperate areas of both hemispheres. In the United Kingdom, where it is rare, it grows on dry, old oak bark. In Switzerland, it has been recorded on oak in the Swiss Plateau and on conifers at high elevations (upper montane and subalpine zones) in the northern Prealps. In Tasmania, Calicium adspersum subsp. australe is considered rather uncommon (or easily overlooked) and occurs on dead wood, usually on standing trees, in sclerophyll forest and rainforest. In north-western European Russia, Calicium adspersum has been confirmed from Leningrad Region on Picea bark (the first verified regional record, after an earlier unvouchered 1837 report from "St. Petersburg"), and it is otherwise reported from Karelia and widely across Fennoscandia and the Baltic states, where it is associated with southern taiga forests.

In North America, it was known from only 11 verified collections in 1999. In North America, confirmed records are associated with cool, humid forests under maritime influence, where the lichen grows on the aged bark of old conifers, usually on rain-sheltered parts of the lower trunk such as bark crevices, the dry side of leaning trunks, or the undersides of limbs. In a 2003 survey of calicioid fungi and lichens of Oregon, Jouko Rikkinen characterized the species as uncommon, occurring on conifer bark in humid low-elevation forests. Other western North American states in its range include Washington and California. In eastern North America, the occurrence of C. adspersum was long uncertain, because several older reports published under the synonym Calicium roscidum were unverified and some herbarium material later proved to be misidentified. Selva confirmed the species from two Maryland specimens collected in 1909 (Baltimore County, Caves Valley) on Acer rubrum, and also reported it from Tennessee on Tsuga canadensis; he also noted a published record from Acadia National Park in Maine. In California, the species is known from a single collection in Jedediah Smith Redwoods State Park in Del Norte County, where it was recorded from the bark of a living coast redwood.

== Conservation ==
NatureServe ranks Calicium adspersum as globally G3 (vulnerable) (listed as G3G4, meaning it falls between vulnerable and apparently secure), but also flags that the assessment needs review and was last reviewed in 2006. The species is described as uncommon to rare across a wide, multi-continental range, with strong declines since pre-industrial times, and it is considered particularly rare and not secure in North America, where it is known from only about 11 collections (mainly in the Pacific Northwest). NatureServe estimates roughly 21–80 known occurrences worldwide (with many historic), considers the degree of threat high, and links risk mainly to the loss and fragmentation of old-growth forest, because the lichen is closely tied to the bark or wood of very old trees (often conifers over about 200 years). Reported trends suggest a long-term decline of 70–90% and a short-term decline of 10–30%; the species is treated as highly vulnerable and slow to recover, since suitable habitat may take a century or more to return after major disturbance. In North America, its scarcity appears to be tied less to host identity alone than to its narrow microhabitat requirements, as it is largely confined to rain-sheltered bark on very old trees in old-growth stands. The loss and fragmentation of such habitat have therefore been regarded as major threats, and altered fire regimes may add further risk, either through severe wildfire or through burns that damage the lower trunks on which the lichen grows. The species may also be under-recorded, because reliable field identification generally requires magnification and familiarity with pin-lichen microhabitats, so its apparent absence from general lichen surveys does not necessarily show that it is truly absent from a site.
