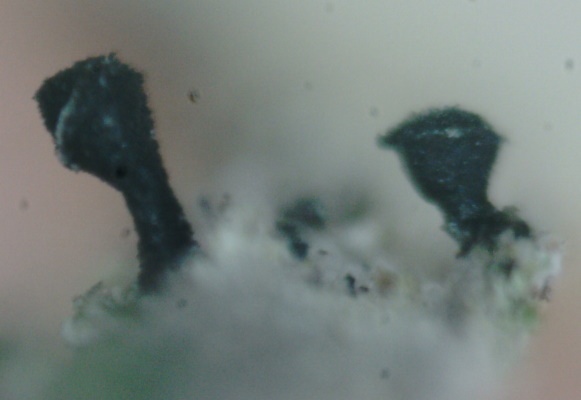

Conservation status
- Apparently Secure (NatureServe)

Scientific classification
- Kingdom: Fungi
- Division: Ascomycota
- Class: Lecanoromycetes
- Order: Caliciales
- Family: Caliciaceae
- Genus: Calicium
- Species: C. glaucellum

Binomial name
- Calicium glaucellum Ach. (1803)

= Calicium glaucellum =

Species of lichen

Calicium glaucellum is a crustose lichen that is found growing on trees throughout much of the world. The species is similar to Calicium abietinum.

The species is commonly found in northern boreal to temperate zones in North, Central, and South America and the South West region of Western Australia.

== Morphology ==
This lichen has a lichenized life habit. Its thallus is typically immersed, but can rarely be superficial and then thin, indistinct, and dark grayish green with a granular appearance.

The apothecia of C. glaucellum usually have a faint white pruina, at least along the edge (upper part) of the exciple and below the capitulum. They are 0.5-1 mm tall and 4-9 times as high as the width of the stalk.

The stalk is shiny black, 0.11-0.17 mm wide, and consists of blackish brown to dark aeruginose, irregularly interwoven and strongly sclerotized hyphae that become paler towards the surface. The outermost layer of the stalk is paler and has a distinct, gelatinous, hyaline coat.

The capitulum is obovoid to lenticular, measuring 0.23-0.34 mm in diameter. The exciple is dark brown to aeruginose, composed of elongated to almost isodiametric sclerotized hyphae that are paler in the outer part and distinctly anticlinally arranged. The hypothecium is dark brown with a flat or slightly convex upper surface.

The asci are cylindrical, 35-41 μm x 3.5-4.5 μm, and contain uniseriate spores. The ascospores are ellipsoid, 9-13 x 4-6.5 μm, with a coarse irregular ornamentation of cracks and ridge fragments. Semi-mature spores have a very irregular sulcate pattern, mainly with longitudinally arranged ridges disrupted by irregular cracks.

Pycnidia are frequently present, producing narrowly cylindrical conidia that are 4-5 x 0.8 μm.

== Chemistry ==
Spot tests show the thallus is K+ dull yellow, C−, KC−, P−, and the apothecia are I−.

The secondary chemistry can vary, with either no detected substances or the presence of sekikaic acid (major), 2-O-methylsekikaic acid (minor), and 4-O-methylhypoprotocetraric acid.

== Ecology and distribution ==
Calicium glaucellum grows on old stumps, standing or fallen wood of both coniferous and deciduous trees, and more rarely on bark. It often occurs in exposed situations.

The species is found in the northern boreal to temperate zones of North, Central, and South America, as well as Australasia. In the Sonoran region, it has been reported from southern California and Chihuahua.

== Distinguishing features ==
Calicium glaucellum is recognized by its rather short-stalked apothecia, the presence of a white rim along the edge of the exciple, the usually immersed thallus, and the medium-sized spores with an ornamentation of irregular ridges and cracks. It is very similar to C. abietinum but differs in having a more pronounced white pruina, black stalks instead of brownish ones, and slightly smaller spores with a different ornamentation pattern.
