= Calicium chlorosporum =

Scientific classification
- Domain: Eukaryota
- Kingdom: Fungi
- Division: Ascomycota
- Class: Lecanoromycetes
- Order: Caliciales
- Family: Caliciaceae
- Genus: Calicium
- Species: C. chlorosporum

Binomial name
- Calicium chlorosporum F.Wilson (1891)

Species of lichen

Calicium chlorosporum is a crustose lichen that is found growing on trees throughout much of the world.

== Morphology ==
The lichen has a lichenized life habit. Its thallus is verrucose, areolate or subimmersed, and pale brownish yellow to beige in color.

The apothecia are 0.75-1.1 mm high and 6-9 times as high as the width of the stalk. The stalk is shining black or has a brownish pruina in the uppermost part, is rather thick at 0.8-0.16 mm in diameter, and consists of dark greenish brown, sclerotized, and irregularly interwoven, 2-3 μm thick hyphae. The outermost part of the stalk is pale brown and surrounded by a 2-4 μm thick, hyaline, I-, gelatinous coat.

The capitulum is broadly obconical to lenticular, black, and has a brownish or sometimes bright yellow pruina on the lower side, measuring 0.29-0.45 mm in diameter. The mazaedium has a faint yellow pruina, particularly in young ascomata. The exciple is densely interwoven and heavily sclerotized, and the hypothecium has a flat upper surface, is dark brown, and has reticulately interwoven hyphae.

The asci are cylindrical, with uniseriate or slightly overlapping spores that are 33-36 x 3.5-4.5 μm. The ascospores are ellipsoid, distinctly ornamented with spirally arranged ridges and a few irregular cracks, and measure 10.5-12.5 x 5-6 μm.

== Chemistry ==
Spot tests show the thallus is K+ yellow turning red or K-, C-, P+ yellow, UV+ intensely yellow or dull (varying amounts of xanthones). The brown pruina is K+ violet-red, with feather-like crystals. All parts of the apothecia are I-.

The thallus contains the secondary metabolites placodiolic acid, +norstictic acid, and unidentified xanthones.

== Ecology and distribution ==
Calicium chlorosporum grows on the bark of Jatropha at low, coastal elevations. Its known distribution includes Africa, North America, Central America, South America, and Australasia, with a record from Baja California in the Sonoran region.
