= Caloplaca tibellii =

Scientific classification
- Kingdom: Fungi
- Division: Ascomycota
- Class: Lecanoromycetes
- Order: Teloschistales
- Family: Teloschistaceae
- Genus: Caloplaca
- Species: C. tibellii

Binomial name
- Caloplaca tibellii S.Y.Kondr. & Kärnefelt (2009)
- Holotype site: Porongurup National Park, Western Australia

Species of lichen

Caloplaca tibellii is a species of corticolous (bark-dwelling), crustose lichen in the family Teloschistaceae. Found in Australia, it was formally described as a new species in 2009 by lichenologists Sergey Kondratyuk and Ingvar Kärnefelt. The type specimen was collected from Porongurup National Park, where it was found growing on the decaying bark of Eucalyptus. The species epithet honours Swedish lichenologist Leif Tibell, who collected the type in 1983.

== See also ==
- List of Caloplaca species
