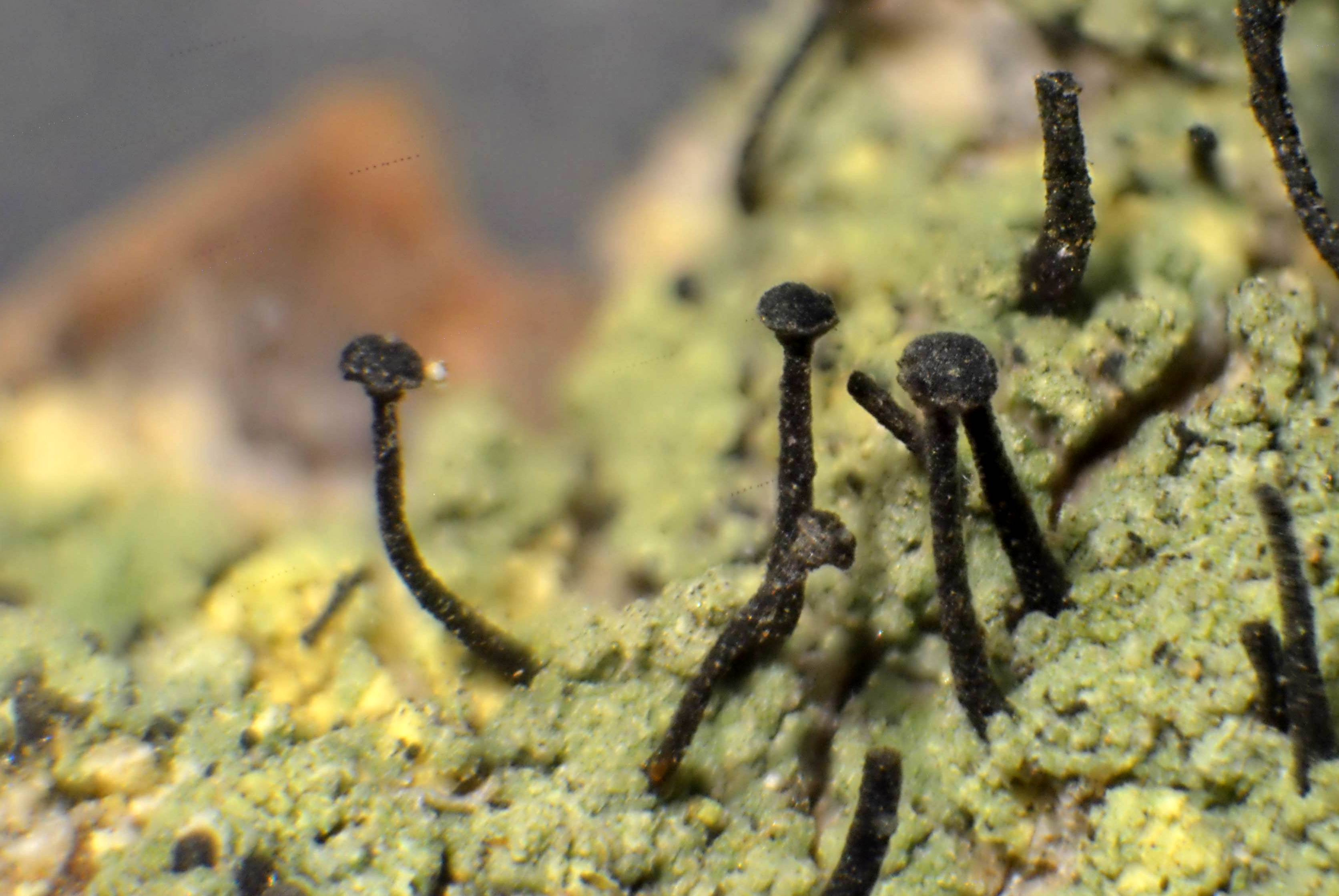
- Calicium viride

Scientific classification
- Kingdom: Fungi
- Division: Ascomycota
- Class: Lecanoromycetes
- Order: Caliciales
- Family: Caliciaceae
- Genus: Calicium; Pers. (1794)

Type species
- Calicium viride Pers. (1794)

= Calicium =

Genus of lichen-forming fungi

Calicium is a genus of leprose lichens. It is in the family Caliciaceae, and has 40 species.

The sexual reproduction structures are a mass of loose ascospores that are enclosed by a cup shaped exciple sitting on top of a tiny stalk, having the appearance of a dressmaker's pin (called a mazaedium), hence the common name pin lichen. They are also commonly called stubble lichens.

They have been used as indicator species for old growth redwood forests.

== Taxonomy ==
The genus was circumscribed in 1794 by the mycologist Christiaan Hendrik Persoon. He included three species in his initial circumscription of the genus: C. viride, C. salicinum, and C. pallidum. The genus name, derived from the Latin calix or calicis ("cup") with the diminutive suffix -ium, refers to the shape of the ascocarps.

== Description ==
The genus Calicium features crustose lichens, which can be verrucose to granular in texture, or immersed in the substrate, and display a range of colours from grey to green-grey, pale yellow, or dark green. Its photobiont, a symbiotic green alga, is of the trebouxioid type. The ascomata (fruiting bodies) are apothecial in nature, usually elevated on a long, distinct stalk with a spherical to lens-shaped head, though some may be directly attached (sessile). These stalks consist of thickened hyphae that are brown to greenish-black and irregularly interwoven. The cup-shaped excipulum, a supportive structure around the ascomata, is well developed and envelops the dry spore mass.

The asci (spore-bearing cells) are cylindrical to clavate (club-shaped) and develop individually from ascogenous hyphae with croziers, typically dissolving early in their lifespan. Ascospores within the genus contain a single septum and form a distinctive black, dry-spore mass known as a mazaedium. These spores have a thick, dark brown wall, often adorned with unique ornamentation. They are generally in the size range 7–19 by 4–8 μm.

In terms of asexual reproduction, Calicium possesses pycnidia, which are sessile or slightly immersed structures producing conidia (asexual spores). These pycnidia are simple and spherical with a punctiform (point-like) ostiole. The conidiophores within are branched, with somewhat cylindrical, enteroblastic conidigenous cells. The conidia themselves are broadly ellipsoid to short-cylindrical, colourless, and lack septa.

Chemically, the genus contains an array of compounds including orcinol and ß-orcinol depsides, along with depsidones, dibenzofurans, anthraquinones, xanthones, and chemical derivatives of pulvinic acid. These chemicals vary across different species within the genus.

== Habitat, distribution, and ecology ==
Calicium has a global presence, primarily found in cool to temperate regions, with only a few species known to occur in tropical areas. These species typically grow on bark and wood, with rare occurrences on rocks and one species specifically adapted to siliceous rocks. Calicium prefers environments with low light, high humidity, and shelter, often thriving in old-growth forests, although some species can adapt to more open, sun-exposed locations.

Two species of Calicium are lichenicolous, meaning they grow on other lichens. These are Calicium episcalare, which is parasitic on Hypocenomyce scalaris, and Calicium ramboldiicola, which grows on Ramboldia elabens.

== Evolutionary history ==
The discovery of a Calicium-like fossil in Baltic amber dating back 55–35 million years ago myr indicates that the main distinguishing characteristics of this genus have persisted for at least tens of millions of years. A fossil-calibrated phylogeny that includes this fossil suggests that the family Caliciaceae diversified from its most recent common ancestor 103–156 myr ago in the early Cretaceous. This fossil lichen has since been formally named as Calicium succini.

== Species ==
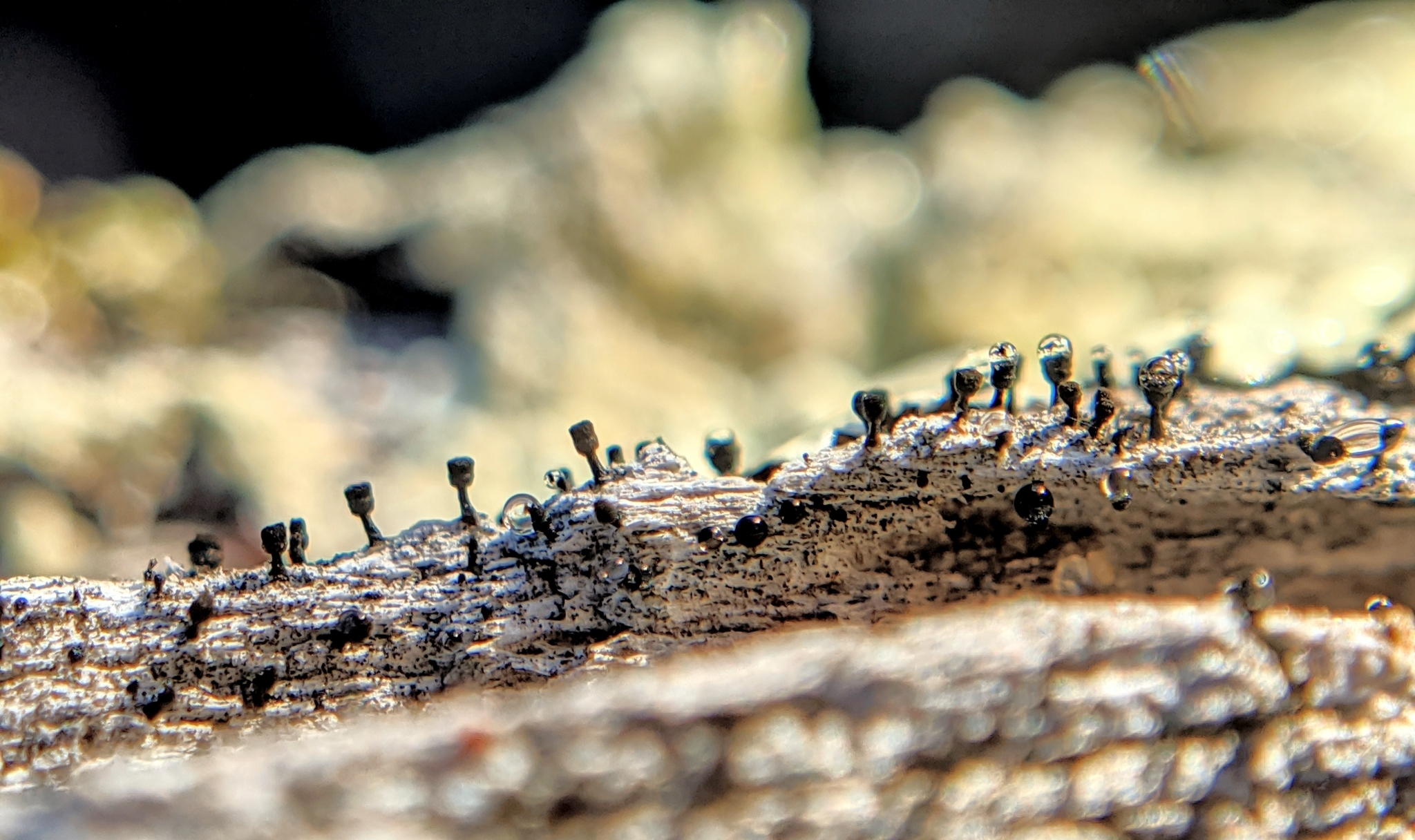
Calicium abietinum

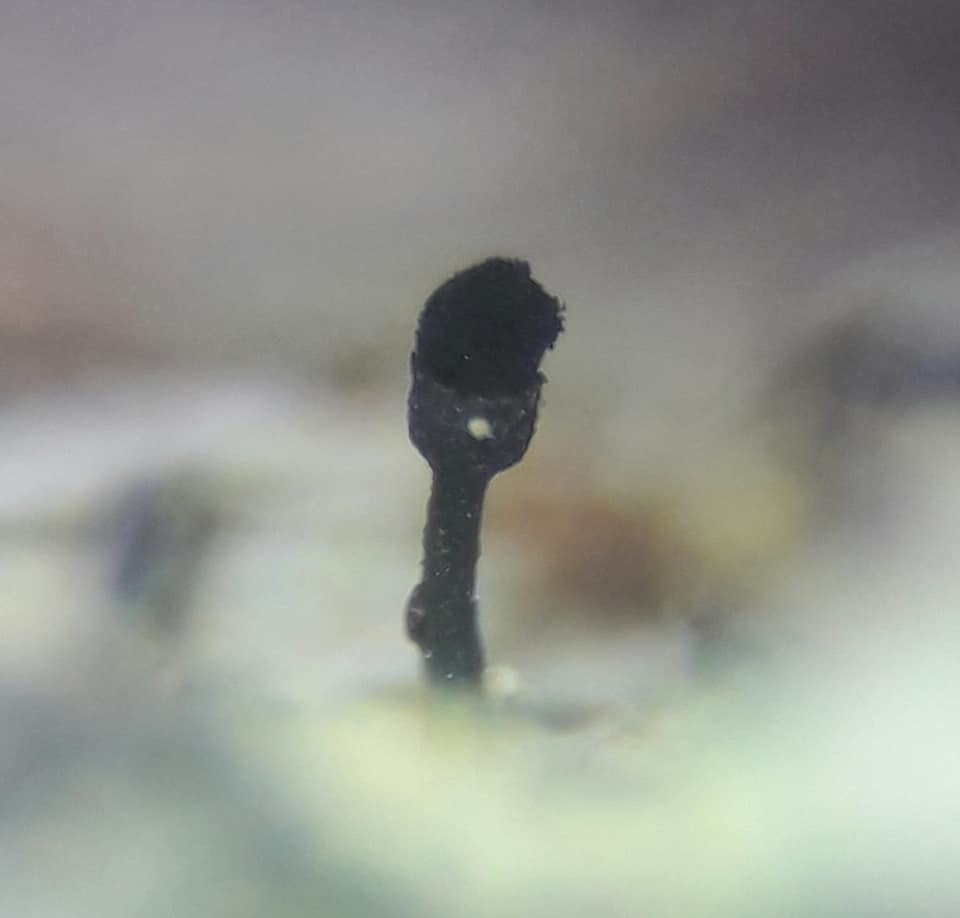
Calicium hyperelloides

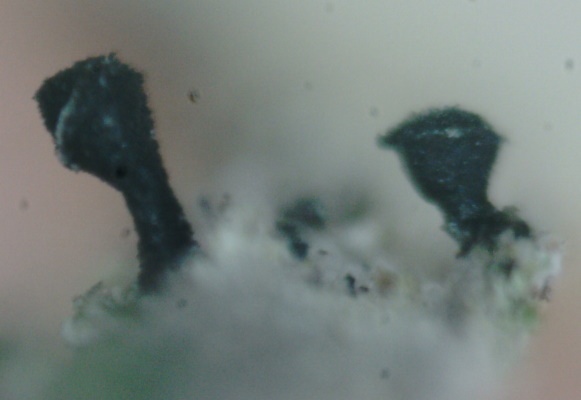
Calicium glaucellum

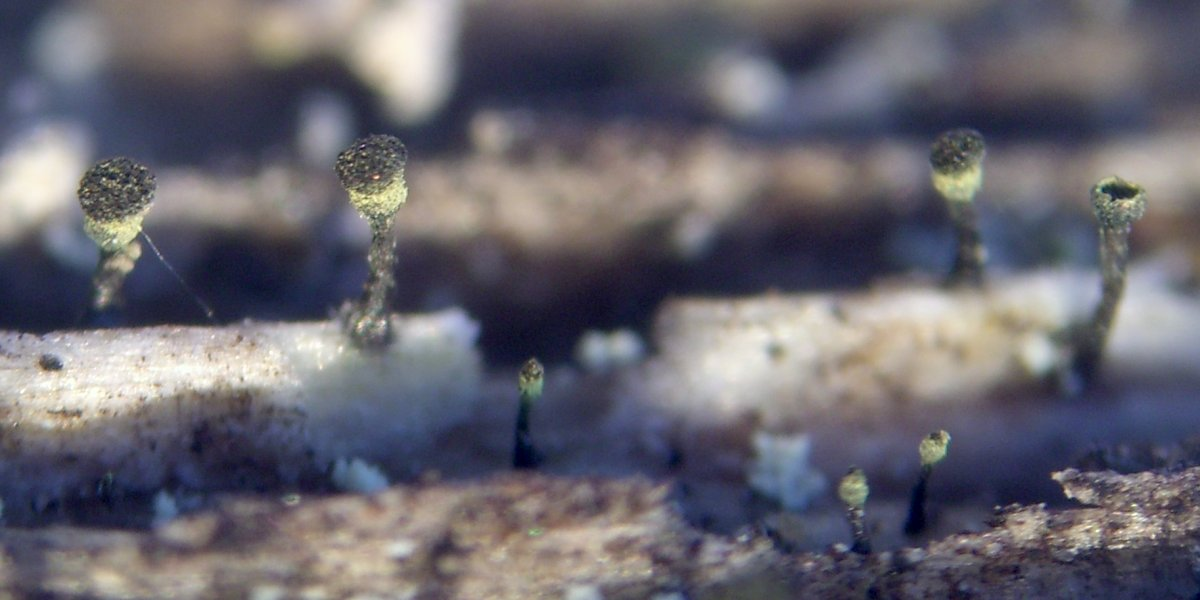
Calicium trabinellum

As of December 2023, Species Fungorum (in the Catalogue of Life) accepts 40 species in Calicium:

- Calicium abietinum Pers. (1797)
- Calicium adspersum Pers. (1798)
- Calicium atronitescens F.Wilson (1891)
- Calicium brachysporum (Nádv.) K.Knudsen, Kocourk. & Lendemer (2020) – California
- Calicium carolinianum (Tuck.) M.Prieto & Wedin (2016)
- Calicium chlorosporum F.Wilson (1891)
- Calicium contortum F.Wilson (1889)
- Calicium corynellum (Ach.) Ach. (1803)
- Calicium diploellum Nyl. (1868)
- Calicium episcalare L.Tibell & T.Knutsson (2016) – Sweden
- Calicium glebosum Müll.Arg. (1887)
- Calicium hyperelloides Nyl. (1860)
- Calicium indicum Tibell (2006)
- Calicium laevigatum Tibell (2006)
- Calicium lecideinum (Nyl.) M.Prieto & Wedin (2016)
- Calicium lenticulare Ach. (1816)
- Calicium lucidum (Th.Fr.) M.Prieto & Wedin (2016)
- Calicium lutescens Tibell (2001) – Africa
- Calicium martinii Js.Murray (1960)
- Calicium muriformis Tibell (2003)
- Calicium nobile Tibell (2006)
- Calicium notarisii (Tul.) M.Prieto & Wedin (2016)
- Calicium parvum Tibell (1975)
- Calicium pinicola (Tibell) M.Prieto & Wedin (2016)
- Calicium pleuriseptatum Tibell & Frisch (2010)
- Calicium poculatum G.Thor, McMullin & Gockman (2024)
- Calicium pyriforme Tibell (2006)
- Calicium quercinum Pers. (1797)
- Calicium ramboldiicola Tibell, S.R.Clayden & Wedin (2024)
- Calicium robustellum Nyl. (1861)
- Calicium salicinum Pers. (1794)
- Calicium sequoiae C.B.Williams & Tibell (2008) – California
- Calicium sperlingiae Selva & Tibell (2023) – Oregon, USA
- Calicium succini (Casp.) Rikkinen & A.R.Schmidt (2018)
- Calicium tenuisporum Tibell (2006)
- Calicium tigillare (Ach.) Pers. (1810)
- Calicium trabinellum (Ach.) Ach. (1810)
- Calicium trachylioides (Nyl. ex Branth & Rostr.) M.Prieto & Wedin (2016)
- Calicium tricolor F.Wilson (1889)
- Calicium verrucosum Tibell (2006)
- Calicium victorianum (F.Wilson) Tibell (1987)
- Calicium viride Pers. (1794)

The species Calicium adaequatum, first described by William Nylander in 1869, was moved to the monotypic genus allocalicium in 2016 based on molecular phylogenetics analysis.
