= Calicium robustellum =

Scientific classification
- Domain: Eukaryota
- Kingdom: Fungi
- Division: Ascomycota
- Class: Lecanoromycetes
- Order: Caliciales
- Family: Caliciaceae
- Genus: Calicium
- Species: C. robustellum

Binomial name
- Calicium robustellum Nyl. (1861)

Species of lichen

Calicium robustellum is a crustose lichen that is found growing on trees in the Gascoyne region of Western Australia and in Queensland.
