= Calicium lenticulare =

Scientific classification
- Domain: Eukaryota
- Kingdom: Fungi
- Division: Ascomycota
- Class: Lecanoromycetes
- Order: Caliciales
- Family: Caliciaceae
- Genus: Calicium
- Species: C. lenticulare

Binomial name
- Calicium lenticulare Ach. (1816)

Species of fungus

Calicium lenticulare is a crustose lichen that is found growing on trees in the South West region of Western Australia.
