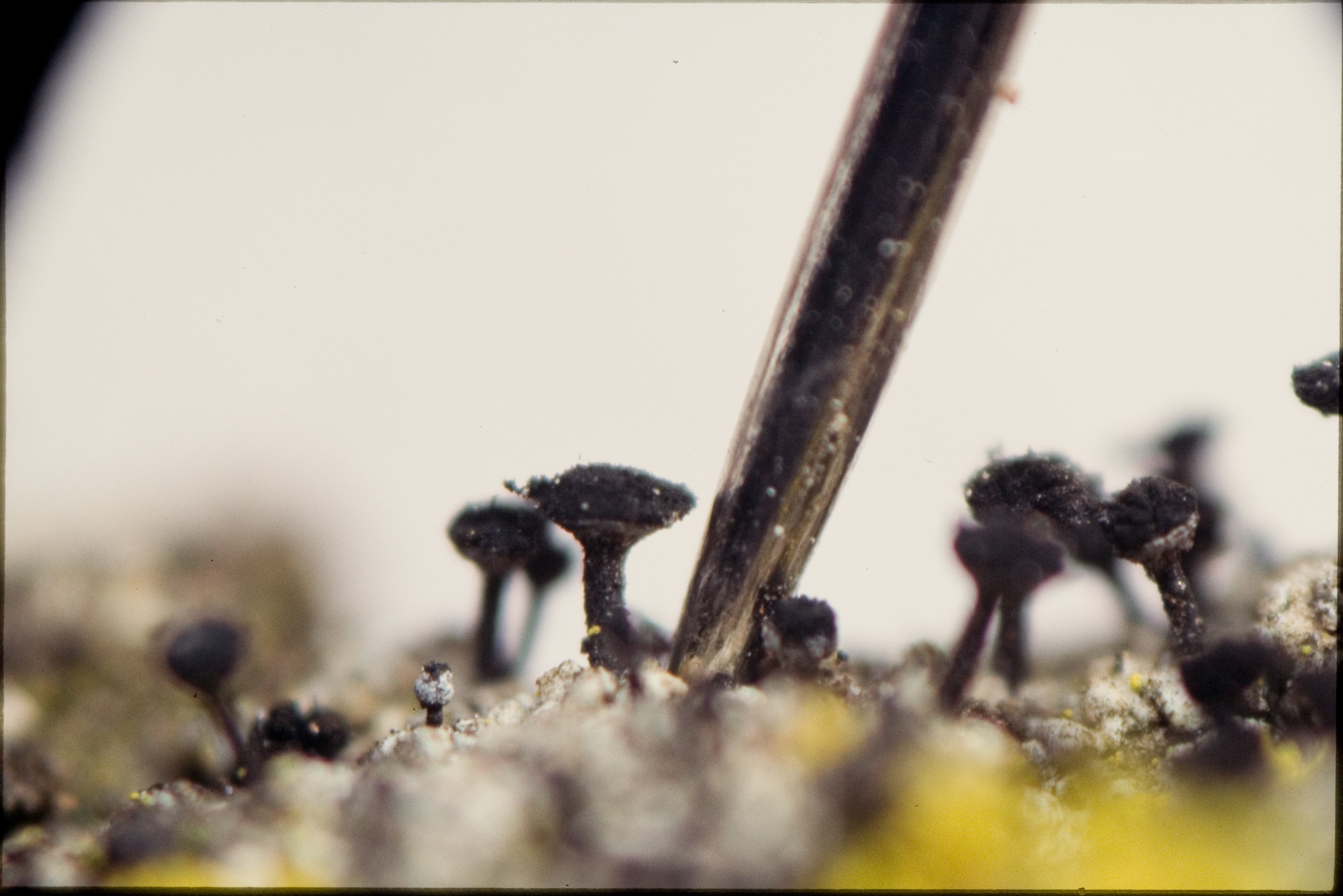

Conservation status
- Vulnerable (NatureServe)

Scientific classification
- Domain: Eukaryota
- Kingdom: Fungi
- Division: Ascomycota
- Class: Lecanoromycetes
- Order: Caliciales
- Family: Caliciaceae
- Genus: Calicium
- Species: C. quercinum

Binomial name
- Calicium quercinum Pers. (1797)

= Calicium quercinum =

Species of lichen

Calicium quercinum is a species of lichen belonging to the family Caliciaceae.

It is native to Europe and North America.
