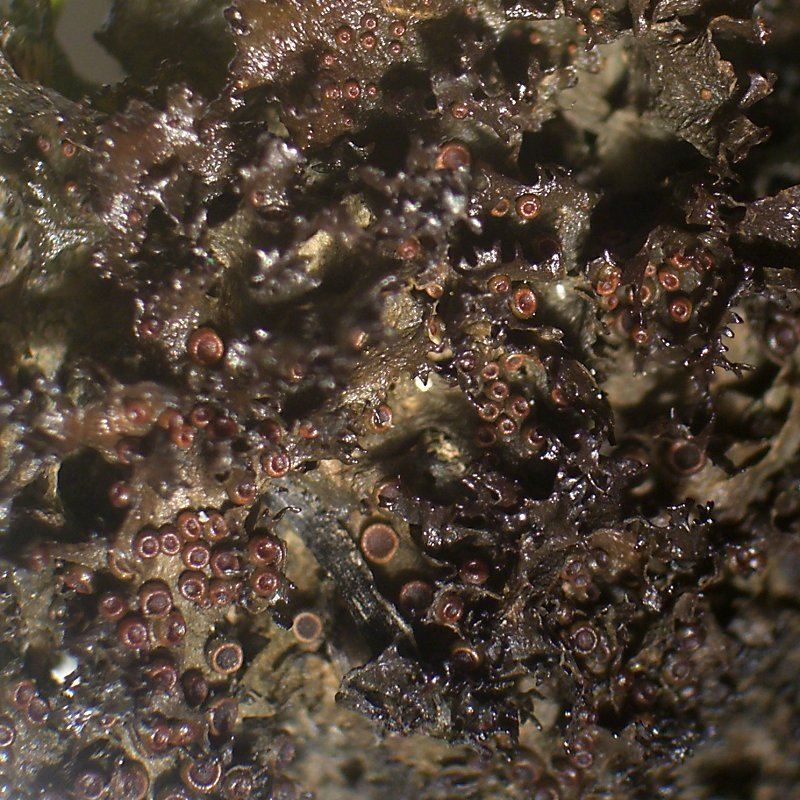

Scientific classification
- Domain: Eukaryota
- Kingdom: Fungi
- Division: Ascomycota
- Class: Lecanoromycetes
- Order: Peltigerales
- Family: Collemataceae
- Genus: Leptogium
- Species: L. corniculatum

Binomial name
- Leptogium corniculatum (Hoffmann) Minks, 1873

= Leptogium corniculatum =

Species of fungus

Leptogium corniculatum is a species of fungus belonging to the family Collemataceae.

It has cosmopolitan distribution.
