= Xanthoparmelia nana =

Scientific classification
- Domain: Eukaryota
- Kingdom: Fungi
- Division: Ascomycota
- Class: Lecanoromycetes
- Order: Lecanorales
- Family: Parmeliaceae
- Genus: Xanthoparmelia
- Species: X. nana

Binomial name
- Xanthoparmelia nana (Kurok.) Elix & J.Johnst. (1987)

Synonyms
- Parmelia nana Kurok. (1985); Paraparmelia nana (Kurok.) Elix & J.Johnst. (1986)

Species of lichen

Xanthoparmelia nana is a lichen species in the genus Xanthoparmelia found in Western Australia.

== See also ==
- List of lichens of Western Australia
- List of Xanthoparmelia species
