= Epanorin =

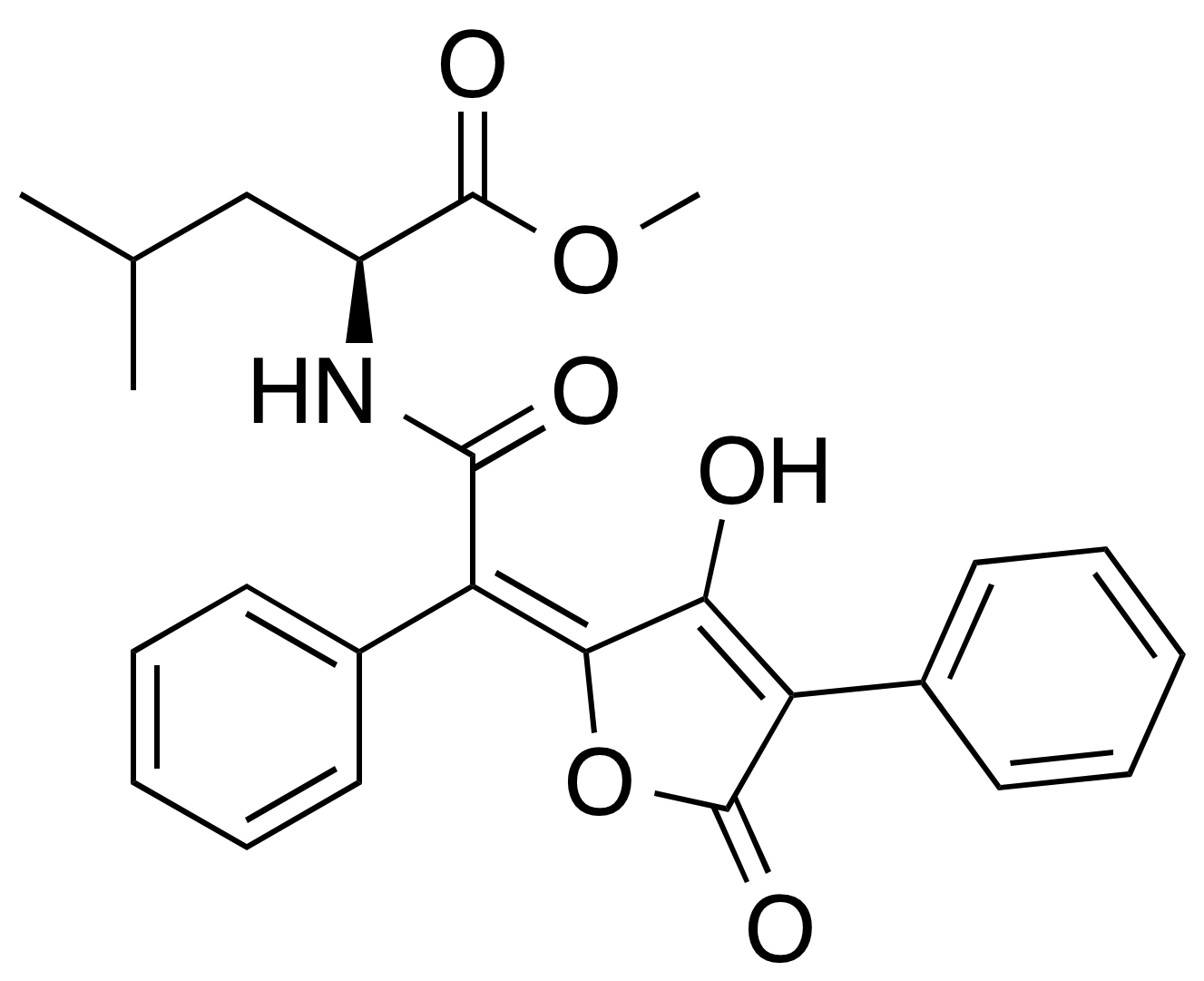

Names
- IUPAC name (1R,2R,13S,15R,16R,23R)-7,9,21-triazahexacyclo[11.9.1.11,15.02,7.09,23.016,21]tetracosane
- Other names CHEBI:144243

Identifiers
CAS Number	18463-10-0
3D model (JSmol)	Interactive image
ChEBI	CHEBI:144243
PubChem CID	101710315
- InChI: InChI=1S/C25H25NO6/c1-15(2)14-18(24(29)31-3)26-23(28)20(17-12-8-5-9-13-17)22-21(27)19(25(30)32-22)16-10-6-4-7-11-16/h4-13,15,18,27H,14H2,1-3H3,(H,26,28)/b22-20-/t18-/m0/s1 Key: IBSRGCBHIASQMQ-BKBKCADHSA-N
- SMILES: CC(C)C[C@@H](C(=O)OC)NC(=O)C(=C1C(=C(C(=O)O1)C2=CC=CC=C2)O)C3=CC=CC=C3

Properties
Chemical formula	C_{25}H_{25}NO_{6}
Molar mass	435.476 g·mol^{−1}
Melting point	162–163 °C (324–325 °F; 435–436 K)
- Except where otherwise noted, data are given for materials in their standard state (at 25 °C [77 °F], 100 kPa). Infobox references

Epanorin is a lichen secondary metabolite with the molecular formula C_{25}H_{25}NO_{6}. Epanorin inhibits the proliferation of MCF-7 cancer cells.
