= Tibell =

Tibell is a Swedish surname. Notable people with the surname include:

- Leif Tibell (born 1944), Swedish lichenologist and Emeritus Professor at the University of Uppsala
- Darrell Tibell (born 2002), Swedish footballer
- Charlotte Cecilia af Tibell (1820–1901), Swedish author and hymnwriter
