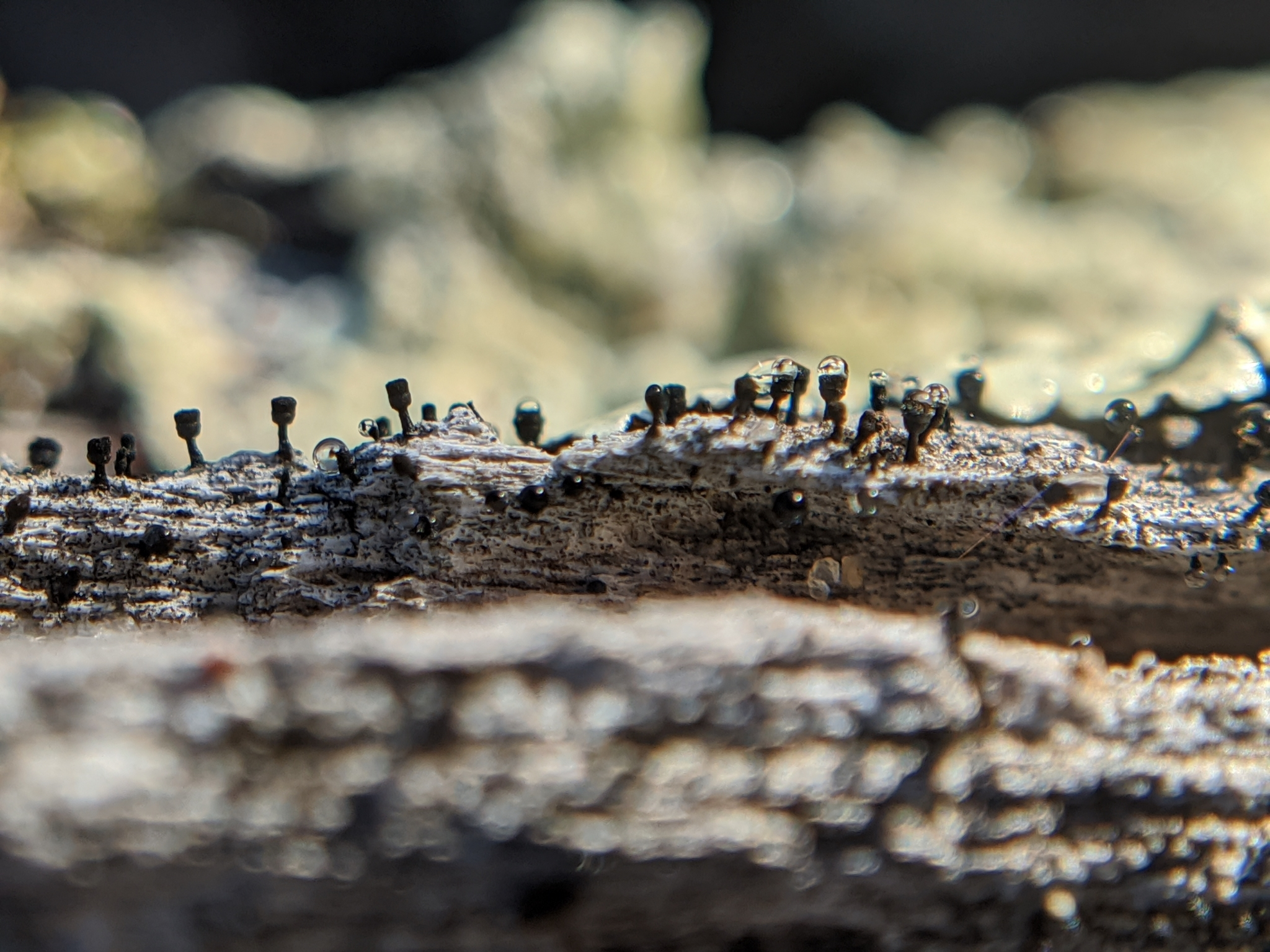

Conservation status
- Apparently Secure (NatureServe)

Scientific classification
- Kingdom: Fungi
- Division: Ascomycota
- Class: Lecanoromycetes
- Order: Caliciales
- Family: Caliciaceae
- Genus: Calicium
- Species: C. abietinum

Binomial name
- Calicium abietinum Pers. (1797)

= Calicium abietinum =

Species of lichen

Calicium abietinum, commonly known as fir pin or black stubble, is a crustose lichen that is found growing on trees throughout much of the world.

== Morphology ==
The lichen has a lichenized life habit. Its thallus is immersed.

The apothecia are not pruinose, 0.6-0.9 mm tall, and 6-11 times as high as the width of the stalk. The stalk is dark brown in longitudinal section, consisting of densely intertwined, sclerotized hyphae. The outermost part of the stalk is +hyaline, with pale hyphae and a thin sheet of gelatinous material at the surface, often with a brownish or olivaceous tinge, or shiny black, and 0.08-0.13 mm wide.

The capitulum is 0.21-0.28 mm in diameter and lens- or slightly bell-shaped. The exciple has an upper part that is often slightly translucent and pale, formed as a continuation of the stalk tissue, with isodiametric to slightly elongated and anti-clinally arranged, heavily sclerotized cells. The hypothecium is flat or slightly convex.

The asci are 44 x 4-5 μm, cylindrical, and have uniseriate spores. The ascospores are semi-mature without ornamentation, but mature spores are ellipsoid, 11-15 x 5-7 μm, with irregular ornamentation of small pustules (minutely warted) giving rise to a dotted appearance under a light microscope, sometimes with a few irregular cracks.

== Chemistry ==
Spot tests show the thallus is K−, C−, KC−, P−, and the apothecia are I−.

== Ecology and distribution ==
Calicium abietinum grows on wood, especially conifers and oaks, as well as on decaying stumps and logs, in the fringe areas of forests in moderate to rather strong light.

Its known distribution includes Europe, North America, Central America, South America, and Australasia. In the Sonoran region, it has been recorded from Arizona and the Channel Islands of California.
