= Francis Wilson (lichenologist) =

Australian lichenologist (1832–1903)

Francis Robert Muter Wilson (1832–1903), Presbyterian minister at Kew, Melbourne, was arguably Australia's first lichenologist. He came to Australia in 1862 to minister at Kew, but developed an interest in the natural world. He discovered many Australian and Pacific Island species of lichens. His collecting trips took him to Lorne, Lakes Entrance, Ferntree Gully, Brisbane, Sydney and Suva, Fiji. Between 1897 and 1900 he wrote at least 20 articles on lichens, publishing many new species. After his death his collections were purchased by the National Herbarium of New South Wales and the National Herbarium of Victoria. However the latter set was sent to the Italian botanist Giacomo Albo to be studied, and was lost in transit, never to be recovered.

The lichen genus Franwilsia was named in his honour in 2014.

Specimens collected by Wilson are cared for at the National Herbarium of Victoria, Royal Botanic Gardens Victoria, and Te Papa, Aotearoa New Zealand.

== Works ==
- “Notes on a Few Victorian Lichens” (Vict. Nat., iv., 83, 1887)
- “Descriptions of two New Lichens, and a List of Additional Lichens New to Victoria (ib., v., 19, 1888)
- “An Hour on a Coral Island, by a Student of Lichenology” (ib., v., 141, 1888);
- “A Hunt for Lichens in East Gippsland, Victoria” (ib., vi., 57, 1889);
- “An Additional List of Lichens New to Victoria” (ib., vi., 60, 1889);
- “A Description of Forty-one Victorian Lichens New to Science” (ib., vi., 61, 1889)
- “An Additional List of Lichens New to Victoria” (ib., vi., 76 [sic; 77], 1889)
- “Notes on Lichens in New South Wales” (Proc. Roy. Soc. Q., vi., 85, 1889);
- “List of Lichens Found in New South Wales” (ib., vi., 89 1889);
- “Notes on a Remarkable Growth in Connection with a New Species of Sticta, with Description of both” (ib., vii., 8, 1889)
- “Lichens from the Victorian Alps” (Vict. Nat. vi., 178, 1890);
- “Lichens from Western Australia” (ib., vi., 180, 1890);
- “Australian Lichenology” (Trans. A.A.A.S., ii., 549, 1890);
- “A List of Queensland Lichens New to Science” (Bailey's Botany Bulletin, No. 7, 28, 1891);
- “On Lichens Collected in Victoria, Australia” Journ. Linn. Soc. (Botany), xxviii., 353, 1891);
- “The Climate of Eastern Tasmania as Indicated by its Lichen Flora” (Proc. Roy. Soc. Tasmania, 131, 1892);
- “Tasmanian Lichens” (ib., 133, 1892);
- “The Lichens of Victoria, Part. i. “(Proc. Roy Soc. Victoria, vol. v., 2nd Series, 141, 1892);
- “On Mr. Robert Hall’s Collection of Lichens from Kerguelen Island” (Vict. Nat., xv., 41, 1898);
- “Lichenes Kerguelenses a Roberto Hall, Anno 1898, Prope Royal Sound in Kerguelen insula lecti, et in Herbario Nationali, Melbourniensi, depositi” (Mem. de L’Herbier Boissier, No. 18, 87, 1900)
