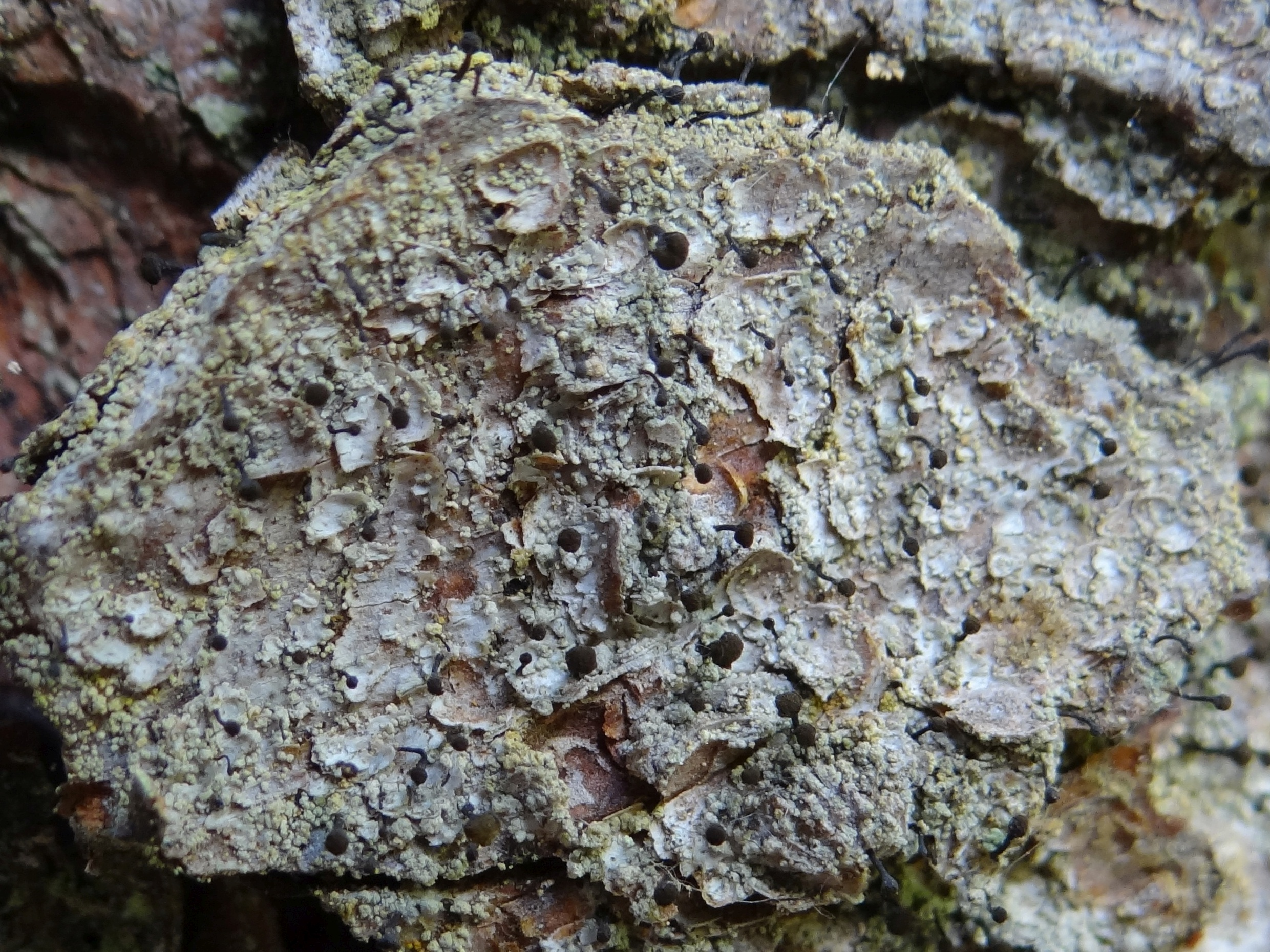
- Calicium salicinum on Pinus in the Tatra Mountains in Poland

Conservation status
- Secure (NatureServe)

Scientific classification
- Domain: Eukaryota
- Kingdom: Fungi
- Division: Ascomycota
- Class: Lecanoromycetes
- Order: Caliciales
- Family: Caliciaceae
- Genus: Calicium
- Species: C. salicinum

Binomial name
- Calicium salicinum Pers.

= Calicium salicinum =

Species of fungus

Calicium salicinum is a crustose lichen that is found growing on trees in the South West region of Western Australia.
