= Josef Nádvorník =

Czech lichenologist

- Born: February 13, 1906; Pláňavy
- Died: July 8, 1977 (aged 71); Prague
- Scientific career
- Fields: Lichenology
- Author abbrev. (botany): Nádv.

Josef Nádvorník (13 February 1906 – 8 July 1977) was a Czech lichenologist. He was an authority on lichens of the order Caliciales and, in particular, the genus Physcia.

== Biography ==
Nádvorník was born in Pláňavy on 13 February 1906. After graduating from a burgher school in Hlinsko, he studied at a teacher training institute in Chrudim, from where he graduated in 1925. He started employment as a teacher in Uzhhorod (now Ukraine), working there from the period 1925–1938. With the onset of the German occupation of Czechoslovakia, he was forced to return to the Protectorate of Bohemia and Moravia from where he first started as a teacher, in Hlinsko and later in Prague. With the support and encouragement of lichenologist Miroslav Servít (1886–1959), Nádvorník began collecting and studying lichens, although he did this in his spare time without support financially. In the 1940s he published two important monographs on the lichen families Caliciaceae and Physciaceae. Nádvorník's expertise was on lichens of the order Caliciales and later also on the genus Physcia. He described 5 new genera, 13 sections and 49 species.

Nádvorník was the first lichenologist to study and publish lichens from Carpathian Ruthenia. He described the difficult conditions of his lichenological research in a letter to Miroslav Servít. Floristic investigations were undertaken in the Jizera Mountains, Belianske Tatras, and Vysoké Tatry, among other locations in the former Czechoslovakia. Nádvorník published three exsiccatae (sets of dried herbarium specimens), namely "Calicieae exsiccatae", "Physciaceae exsiccati" and "Lichenes exsiccati". He collected an abundant number of specimens for his herbarium, which is now stored in the Slovak National Museum in Bratislava. His collections numbered more than 11,000 specimens. He published 29 important works, the most famous of which is the 1956 collaboration of the author trio Černohorský, Nádvorník, and Servít titled Klíčk určování lišejníků ČSR (Key to identification of lichens of Czechoslovakia). His name is honoured in several eponymous lichen species: Bryoria nadvornikiana (Gyeln.) Brodo & D.Hawksw.; Gongylia nadvornikii Servít (1932); Involucrothele nadvornikii (Servít) Servít (1954); Phaeophyscia nadvornikii (Frey & Poelt) N.S.Golubk. (1981); Polyblastia nadvornikii Servít (1937); and Thelidium nadvornikii Servít (1946). The genus Nadvornikia Tibell (1984) was also named in his honour.

Nádvorník died in Prague on 8 July 1977.

== Selected works ==
- Nádvorník J. (1942): Systematische Übersicht der mitteleuropäischen Arten der Flechtenfamilie Caliciaceae. – Stud. Bot. Čechosl. 5: 6–46.
- Nádvorník J. (1947): Physciaceae Tchécoslovaques. – Studia Botanica Čechoslovaca 8(2–4): 69–124.
- Černohorský Z., Nádvorník J. & Servít M. (1956): Klíč k určování lišejníků ČSR. I. díl [Determination key to the lichens of Czechoslovakia. Vol. 1]. – Nakl. ČSAV, Prague.

== See also ==
- Category:Taxa named by Josef Nádvorník
