= Leif Tibell =

Swedish botanist and lichenologist

- Born: 1944 (age 81–82)
- Education: Uppsala University
- Awards: Acharius Medal (2012)
- Scientific career
- Fields: Lichenology
- Workplaces: Swedish Research Council; Uppsala University
- Author abbrev. (botany): Tibell

Leif Tibell (born 16 November 1944) is a Swedish lichenologist and Emeritus Professor at the University of Uppsala. He is known for his expertise on calicioid lichens. He was awarded the Acharius Medal in 2012 for lifetime achievements in lichenology.

== Biography ==
Tibell was born in Gothenburg, Sweden, in 1944. He developed an interest in lichens at a young age after meeting the prominent lichenologist Gunnar Degelius through the Gothenburg Botanical Garden, where they were both members. Degelius mentored Tibell, and recommended to him that he should study the subject at Uppsala University, which he did after moving there in the mid 1960s.

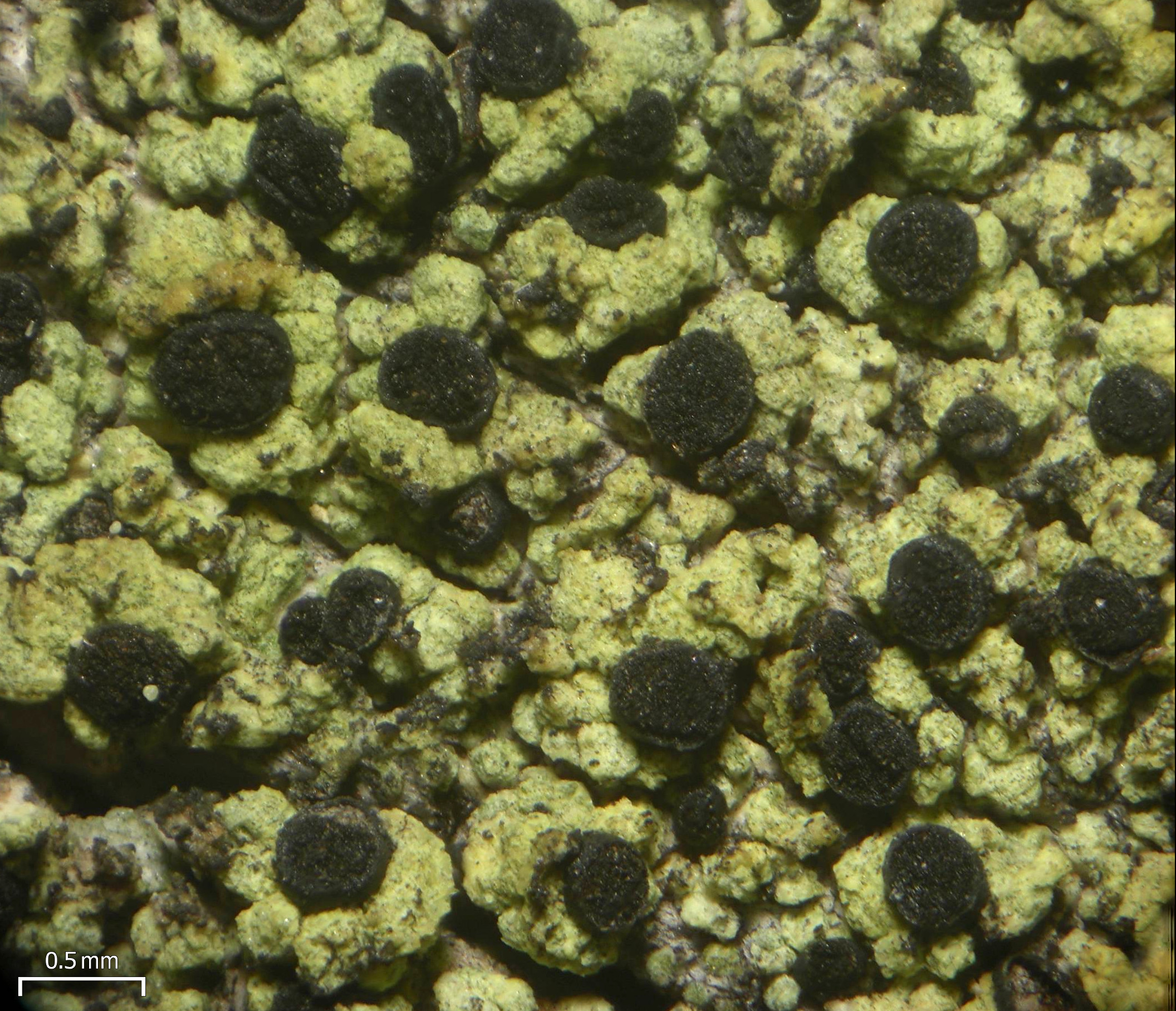
Cyphelium pinicola was described as a new species by Tibell in 1969.

He continued with graduate studies under the supervision of Rolf Santesson after accompanying him on a research excursion to Norway's Varanger Peninsula in 1966. Santesson was Curator of the Herbarium at the Botany Department. He was also the father of Johan Santesson, who knew Tibell through an organic chemistry research group they were both part of. Rolf Santesson, who became Tibell's Ph.D. supervisor and second main mentor, suggested he should study genera of the family Caliciaceae – the pin lichens. Tibell followed his advice and ultimately developed a long career that was largely dedicated to the study of this group. After earning a Ph.D. in 1975, Tibell accepted a position at the Swedish Research Council that he held for many years. In 1978, he started to edit the exsiccata series Caliciales exsiccatae. Tibell was later promoted to Senior Lecturer and ultimately Professor in 2000. As of 2021, he is an Emeritus Professor with the Department of Organismal Biology at Uppsala University.

== Recognition ==
Tibell was awarded the Acharius Medal in 2012. Swedish botanist Mats Wedin noted that another prominent Swedish lichenologist, Erik Acharius (for whom the medal is named), published one of the earliest taxonomic monographs in lichenology also on the subject of calicioid lichens. Tibell had a Festschrift dedicated to him in celebration of his 60th birthday in 2004.

=== Eponyms ===
Several taxa have been named in honour of Tibell. These include: Leifidium Wedin (1993); Tibellia Vězda & Hafellner (1992); Atla tibelliorum Pykälä & Myllys (2016); Caloplaca tibellii S.Y.Kondr. & Kärnefelt (2009); Chaenothecopsis leifiana Titov, Kuzn. & Himelbr. (2004); Chaenothecopsis tibellii Titov (2000); Chapsa tibellii Mangold (2009); Choreospora tibellii Constant. & R.Sant. (1987); Dimerella tibellii Vězda; Diorygma tibellii Kalb, Staiger & Elix (2004); Hypotrachyna tibellii Elix, T.H.Nash & Sipman (2009); Lecanactis tibelliana Egea & Torrente (1994); Phaeocalicium tibellii Kalb (1992); Plectocarpon tibellii Ertz & Diederich (2005); Pronectria tibellii Zhurb. (2004); Pyrgillus tibellii Kr.P.Singh & Pushpi Singh (2012); Rinodina tibellii H.Mayrhofer (1983); Sphaerophorus tibellii Wedin (1992); Xanthoparmelia tibellii T.H.Nash & Elix (2004); and Xanthoria tibellii S.Y.Kondr. & Kärnefelt (2003).

== Selected publications ==
Some of Tibell's major publications include:

- Tibell, Leif (1975). The Caliciales of Boreal North America. Taxonomy, Ecological and Distributional Comparisons With Europe, and Ultrastructural Investigations in Some Species. Symbolae botanicae Upsalienses. Uppsala: Uppsala University. ISBN 91-554-0270-4.
- Tibell, Leif (1984). A Reappraisal of the Taxonomy of Caliciales. Beihefte zur Nova Hedwigia. Vol. 79. pp. 597–713.
- Tibell, Leif (1992). "Crustose lichens as indicators of forest continuity in boreal coniferous forests". Nordic Journal of Botany. 12 (4): 427–450. doi:10.1111/j.1756-1051.1992.tb01325.x.
- Tibell, Leif B. (1994). "Distribution patterns and dispersal strategies of Caliciales". Botanical Journal of the Linnean Society. 116 (3): 159–202. doi:10.1006/bojl.1994.1059.
- Tibell, Leif (1996). Caliciales. Flora Neotropica. Vol. 69. New York Botanical Garden Press. pp. 1–78. JSTOR 4393866.
- Tibell, Leif (2000). "A synopsis of crustose calicioid lichens and fungi from mainland Africa and Madagascar". Nordic Journal of Botany. 20 (6): 717–742. doi:10.1111/j.1756-1051.2000.tb00759.x.
- Tibell, Leif; Wedin, Mats (2000). "Mycocaliciales, a new order for nonlichenized calicioid fungi". Mycologia. 92 (3): 577–581. doi:10.2307/3761518.

== See also ==
- Category:Taxa named by Leif Tibell
