= Boda =

Boda may refer to:

== Geography ==
=== Bangladesh ===
- Boda, Bangladesh, a city
- Boda Upazila, a sub-district in Rangpur Division
  - Boda Union, Rangpur Division, Bangladesh, a union parishad of Boda Upazila

=== Sweden ===
- Böda, a village in Borgholm Municipality, Kalmar province
- Boda, Sweden, a village in Rättvik municipality, Dalarna province
- Böda Church, a church in Öland, Sweden
- Boda glasbruk, a village in Emmaboda Municipality, Kronoberg province
- Böda kronopark, a crown park (kronopark) on Öland
- Böda socken, a former county district on Öland

=== Elsewhere ===
- Boda, Lobaye, Central African Republic, a town
- Boda, Hungary, a village
- Boda, Rajgarh, Madhya Pradesh, India, a town
- Mount Boda, a mountain in Antarctica
- Boda River, a river on Fiji

== People ==
- Imre Boda (born 1961), Hungarian soccer player
- Katsushi Boda (Japanese: 保田 克史), Japanese stop-motion animator
- Victor Biaka Boda (1913–1950), Ivorian politician

== Other uses ==
- Bridge of Don Academy (BODA), a Scottish school in Aberdeen
- BODA, a video codec made by Chips&Media

== See also ==
- Boda boda, a bicycle taxi in Kenya, Tanzania, and Uganda
- Ganesh Bodas (1880–1965), Indian actor
- La Boda (disambiguation)
- Bodan (disambiguation)
