= Nabbelund =

Village in Sweden

Coordinates: 57°20′53″N 17°04′51″E

Area map

Nabbelund is a village in Böda socken, in the Borgholm Municipality of Öland, Sweden. Located on the western shore of the Grankullaviken bay, just south of the lighthouse Långe Erik and north of the village Grankullavik, it was formerly an important shipping port for timber.

== Ship burial Nabberör ==
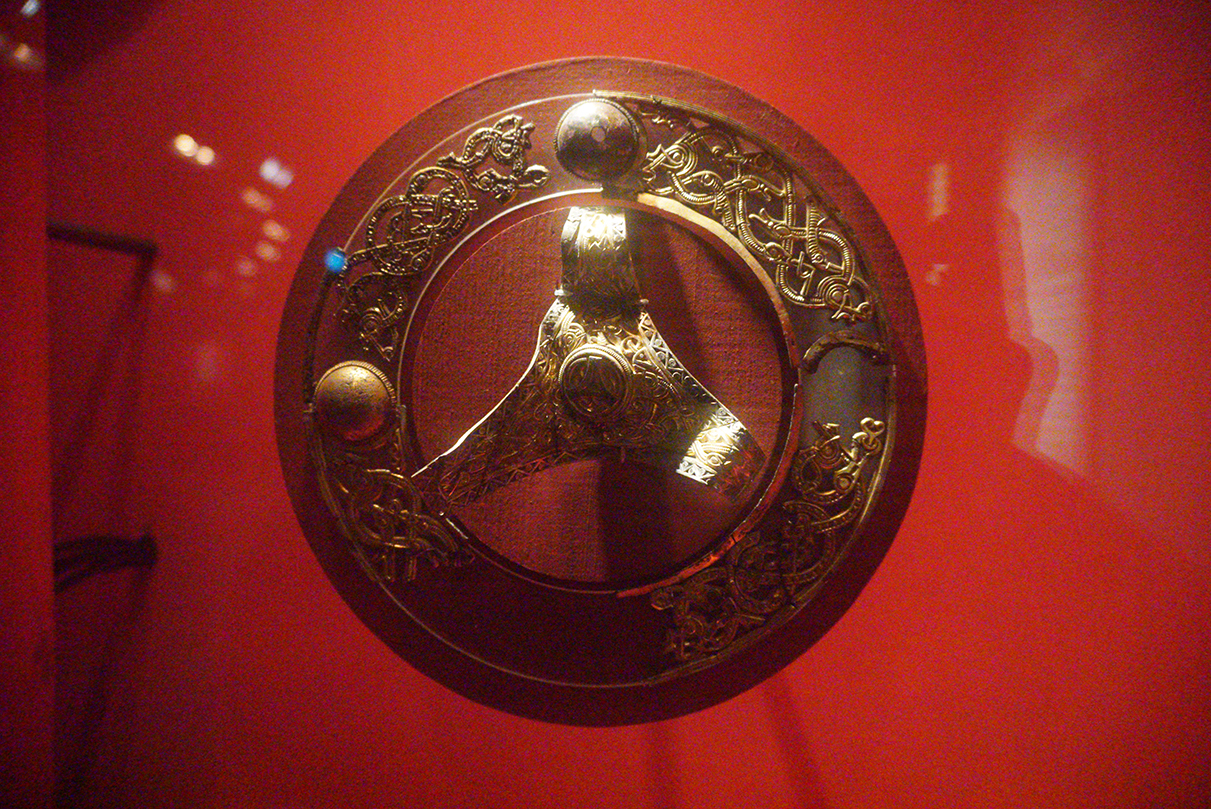

Near Nabbelund is Nabberör, a site discovered in 1938, an important ship burial from the Vendel Period with four skeletons, formerly covered by a cairn and now heavily damaged. It is one of only three ship burials found in northern Europe with more than three sets of remains; two of the skeletons may have been buried in a sitting position.
