= Paracalicium =

Scientific classification
- Kingdom: Fungi
- Division: Ascomycota
- Class: Eurotiomycetes
- Order: Mycocaliciales
- Family: Sphinctrinaceae
- Genus: Paracalicium; Haughland (2025)

Genus of fungi

Paracalicium is a genus of fungi from the Sphinctrinaceae family.

== Species ==
- Paracalicium betulae
- Paracalicium caraganae
- Paracalicium chamaedaphnes
- Paracalicium piceae
- Paracalicium recedens

== Description ==
The first five species were reported in 2025. It was initially thought they belonged to the known Phaeocalicium taxa before further research was done. The name para can be translated in Greek to "beside" or "near", and was used due to the similarity of the taxa to Phaeocalicium.
