= Saint Olaf's chapel (Byxelkrok) =

Coordinates: 57°19′20″N 17°0′43″E

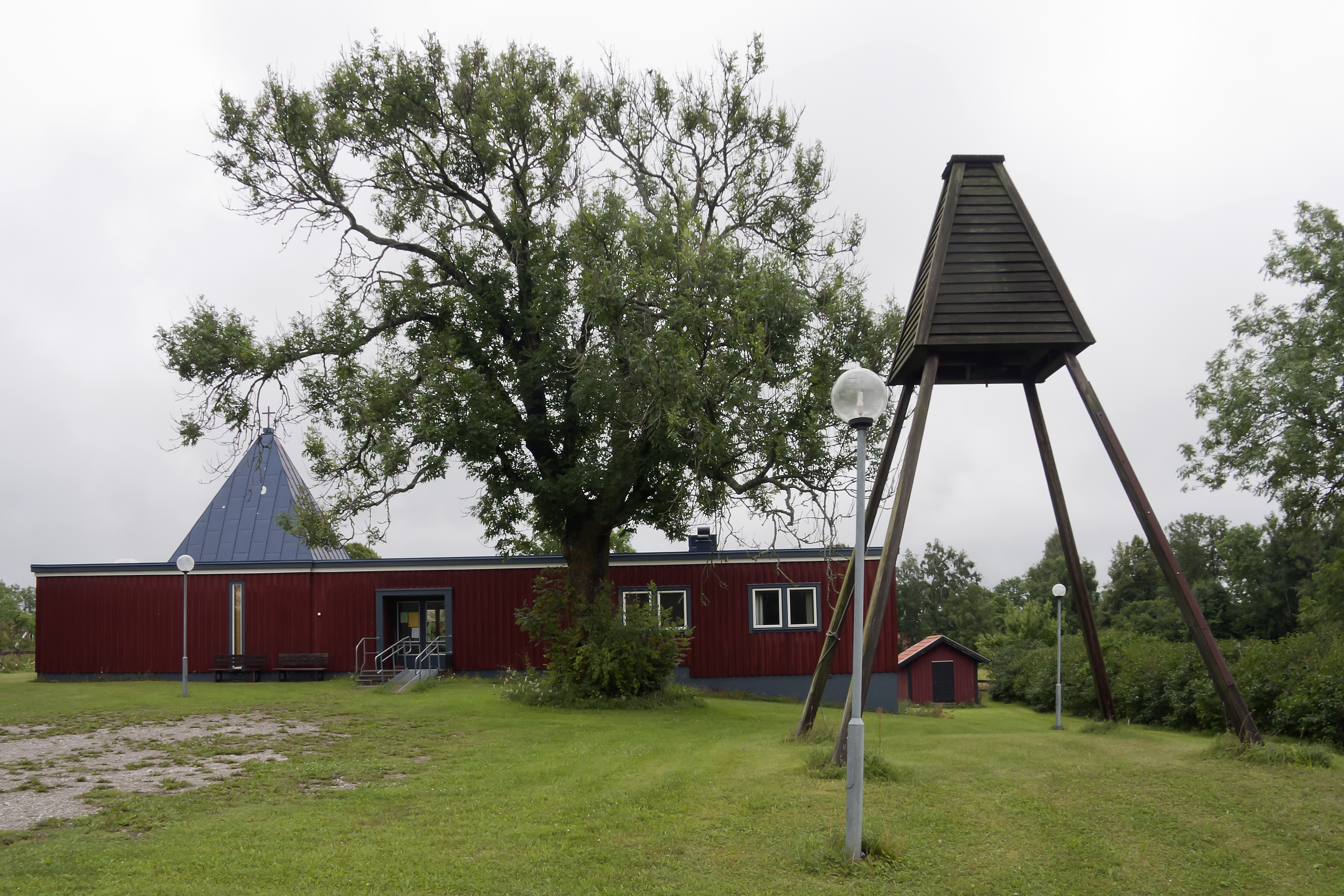
Saint Olaf's chapel, Byxelkrok

Saint Olaf's chapel in Byxelkrok, on the island of Öland, Sweden, was built in 1976. The modernist design is by Anders Berglund. The chapel is in Böda socken in the Diocese of Växjö, and is one of three 20th-century churches on the island.

Another Saint Olaf's chapel on the island, on the small shoal island called Lilla grundet on the Grankullaviken bay, is in ruins, with only a small elevation left as evidence. The chapel and its cemetery are mentioned in a 1515 list from the Diocese of Linköping; possibly stones from the chapel were used to build Långe Erik, the lighthouse on the neighboring island, Stora grundet.

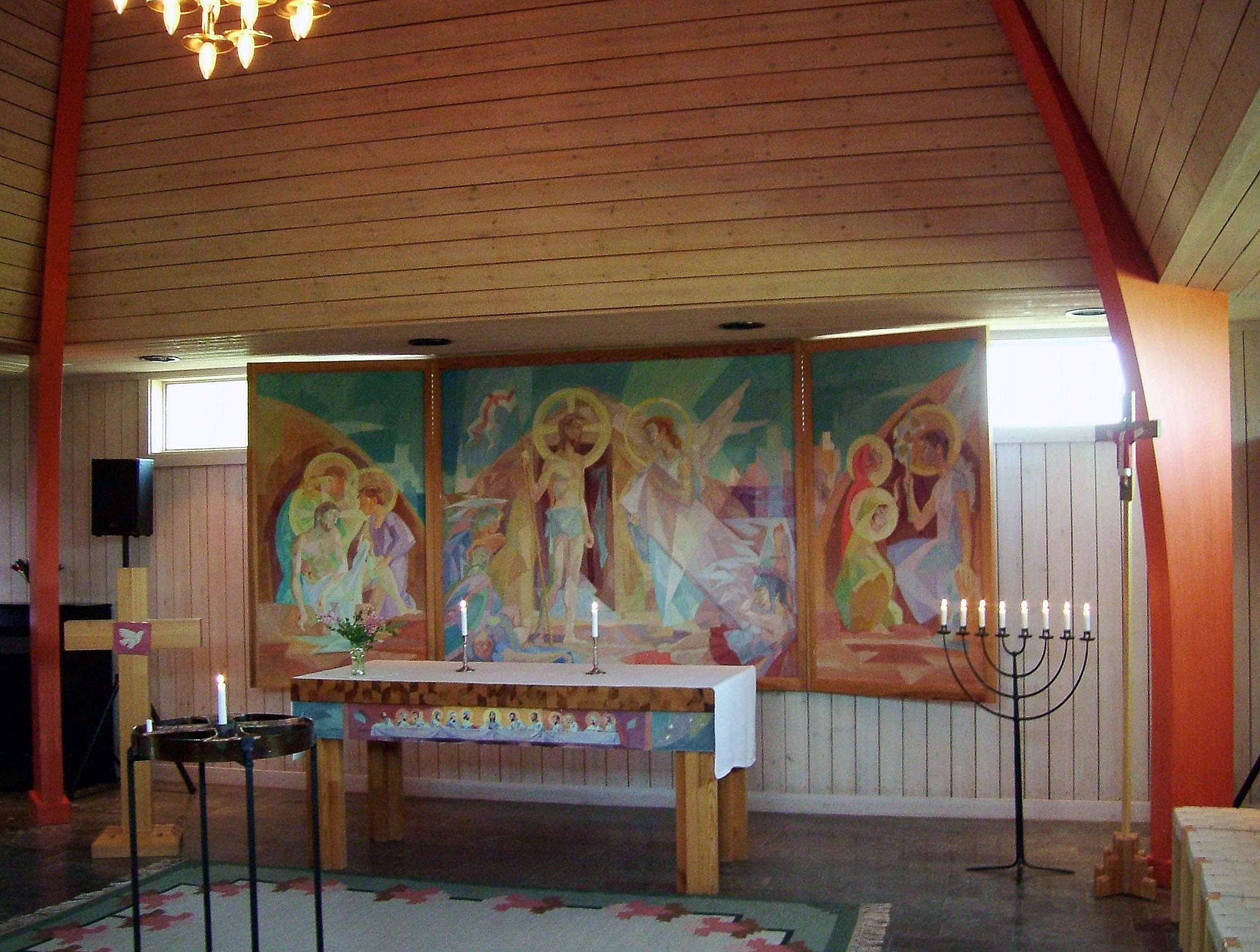
interior
