= Stenocybe tropica =

Scientific classification
- Domain: Eukaryota
- Kingdom: Fungi
- Division: Ascomycota
- Class: Eurotiomycetes
- Order: Mycocaliciales
- Family: Mycocaliciaceae
- Genus: Stenocybe
- Species: S. tropica

Binomial name
- Stenocybe tropica Aptroot (2015)

Species of lichen

Stenocybe tropica is a species of corticolous (bark-dwelling) pin lichen in the family Mycocaliciaceae. Found in Brazil, it was formally described as a new species in 2015 by Dutch lichenologist André Aptroot. The type specimen was collected in Praia de Peruíbe near Itanhaém; here it was found growing on mangrove tree bark. The apothecia are black with a cylindrical to club-shaped head (capitulum) about 0.3 mm in diameter and up to 0.5 mm high. The stalk holding the capitulum is glossy black, up to 0.8 mm tall and about 0.15 mm wide. Its ascospores are dark brown in colour, more or less fusiform (spindle-shaped) with 3 septa, measuring 46–71 by 14–21 μm with mostly pointed tips. No lichen products were detected in the lichen.
