= Phaeocalicium flabelliforme =

Scientific classification
- Kingdom: Fungi
- Division: Ascomycota
- Class: Eurotiomycetes
- Order: Mycocaliciales
- Family: Mycocaliciaceae
- Genus: Phaeocalicium
- Species: P. flabelliforme

Binomial name
- Phaeocalicium flabelliforme Tibell (1996)

Species of fungus

Phaeocalicium flabelliforme is a non-lichenized Ascomycete fungus in the family Mycocaliciaceae.

== Description ==
The fungus forms minute apothecia, 0.27-0.44 mm tall, on the smooth bark of young paper birch, Betula papyrifera.

The fruiting bodies are simple stalks topped by an obconic (upside-down cone) to fan shaped head, that becomes increasingly laterally compressed, or flattened with age. They are shiny and light or dark brown to black in color, with stalks often a paler olive-brown compared to the heads.

Microscopically, the fungus produces ellipsoid, medium brown, areolate, 1-septate (rarely 2-septate) spores 9.6-12.8 μm x 4-5 μm on average, arranged in a single file within each ascus.

== Distribution ==
The Fungus is known to temperate regions of North America and Europe.

In Europe it is known from only one Norway spruce (Picea abies)/birch (Betula) forest in Sweden.

== Chemistry ==
The fruiting bodies do not produce a visible KOHᐨ test reaction.

== Etymology ==
The epithet flabelliforme is a Latin adjective meaning "fan-shaped".
