= Mycocalicium enterographicola =

Scientific classification
- Domain: Eukaryota
- Kingdom: Fungi
- Division: Ascomycota
- Class: Eurotiomycetes
- Order: Mycocaliciales
- Family: Mycocaliciaceae
- Genus: Mycocalicium
- Species: M. enterographicola

Binomial name
- Mycocalicium enterographicola Aptroot & M.Cáceres (2015)

Species of fungus

Mycocalicium enterographicola is a species of lichenicolous fungus in the family Mycocaliciaceae. It is found in Brazil.

== Taxonomy ==
The lichen was formally described as a new species in 2015 by André Aptroot and Marcela Eugenia da Silva Cáceres. The type specimen was collected by the authors from the Mata da Fazenda Cafuz (Pedrinhas, Sergipe); here, in Atlantic Rainforest biome, the lichen was growing parasitically on Enterographa cf. quassiaecola, which were themselves growing on tree trunks. It is the first lichen parasite in the genus Mycocalicium; other species in the genus are saprobic, usually growing on decaying wood.

== Description ==
Mycocalicium enterographicola makes tiny green, turbinate (top-shaped) apothecia (measuring about 0.1 mm in diameter) that rest a top a short stalk and are covered with pruina. Asci are cylindrical, contain eight spores, and have dimensions of 30–35 by 3.0–3.5 μm. Its ascospores are dark grey, ellipsoid in shape, and measure 7.0–8.0 by 2.0–2.5 μm. The stalk and the head of the apothecium both contain pulvinic acid, a lichen product.
