= Jonas Jonsson =

Jonas Jonsson may refer to:

- Jonas Jonsson (19th-century builder) (1806—1885), Swedish master builder
- Jonas Jonsson (footballer) (born 1975), retired Swedish footballer
- Jonas Jonsson (sailor) (1873–1926), Swedish sailor
- Jonas Jonsson (singer), Swedish pop singer/songwriter
- Jonas Jonsson (sport shooter) (1903–1996), Swedish sport shooter
- Jónas Jónsson, Icelandic politician and educator
