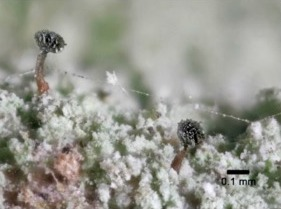
- Apothecia (fruiting bodies) with brown stalks

Scientific classification
- Kingdom: Fungi
- Division: Ascomycota
- Class: Eurotiomycetes
- Order: Mycocaliciales
- Family: Mycocaliciaceae
- Genus: Chaenothecopsis
- Species: C. kilimanjaroensis

Binomial name
- Chaenothecopsis kilimanjaroensis Temu & Tibell (2019)
- Holotype site: Monduli forest reserve, Tanzania

= Chaenothecopsis kilimanjaroensis =

Species of lichen

Chaenothecopsis kilimanjaroensis is a species of lichenicolous (lichen-dwelling) pin lichen in the family Mycocaliciaceae. Found in the cloud forests of Tanzania, it was described as a new species in 2019. These tiny lichens have a short stalk, which can be either single or formed in aggregates on the same thallus. The stalks are medium brown at the base and become translucent in water. This species has unique spores, which contain a single septum (internal partition), are arranged in a single row in the ascus, and have a surface ornamented with elongated, blister-like structures.

== Taxonomy ==
The lichen was formally described as a new species in 2019 by Stella Temu and Leif Tibell. The type specimen was collected by the first author from the Monduli Forest Reserve (Arusha) at an elevation of 2,456 m (8,058 ft). Molecular phylogenetics analysis using internal transcribed spacer DNA sequences indicates that Chaenothecopsis kilimanjaroensis is closely related to Chaenothecopsis debilis.

== Description ==
Chaenothecopsis kilimanjaroensis features a thallus that grows as either a commensal or parasite on sterile lichen crusts or on the thallus of Chaenotheca chloroxantha. The host lichen tends to lose pigmentation and turn mauve-grey when it is parasitised. The apothecia (fruiting bodies) of C. kilimanjaroensis are very short-stalked or with medium-long, olivaceous brown stalks, measuring 0.21–0.27 mm in height. The capitulum (the cup-shaped apothecium on the top of the stalk) can be either single and lens-shaped to broadly obconical, or it may form 2–5 aggregated units on the same, usually short, stalk. The excipulum is dark brown, with an intricate structure composed of intertwined fungal hyphae.

The asci (spore-bearing cells) are cylindrical, containing spores that are arranged in a single row and feature a thickened apex penetrated by a fine canal. The spores themselves are ellipsoidal to narrowly ellipsoidal, pale brown, and measure 6–6.9 μm in length and 2.1–2.6 μm in width. These spores are distinct for their poorly pigmented septum and minutely verrucose ornamentation, which is composed of tiny, often slightly elongated blister-like verrucae. This feature is barely visible with light microscopy, but becomes evident when viewed with scanning electron microscopy (SEM).

== Similar species ==
Chaenothecopsis kilimanjaroensis shares some characteristics with other Chaenothecopsis species, such as C. consociata, C. epithallina, and C. formosa, in that it behaves as a parasite or commensal on the thalli of its host lichens. Its variable ascoma morphology and the structure of its apothecia make it a unique species within the genus. It resembles C. pusilla in having a pale olivaceous brown stalk that is translucent in water, but differs in its host preference and spore septation. It also recalls C. amurense in its irregularly aggregated capitula but is distinguished by its host species and spore type.

== Habitat and distribution ==
This species was discovered growing on the trunks of Nuxia congesta trees in the montane cloud forests of Tanzania. At the time of its original publication, it was only known to occur in the Monduli forest reserve in Arusha, Tanzania.
