= Chaenothecopsis penningtonensis =

Scientific classification
- Kingdom: Fungi
- Division: Ascomycota
- Class: Eurotiomycetes
- Order: Mycocaliciales
- Family: Mycocaliciaceae
- Genus: Chaenothecopsis
- Species: C. penningtonensis

Binomial name
- Chaenothecopsis penningtonensis Gockman, Selva, McMullin (2020)

Species of fungus

Chaenothecopsis penningtonensis is a resinicolous fungus found on Picea mariana bark flakes. Found in Minnesota and Wisconsin, Chaenothecopsis penningtonensis is newly introduced in 2020 by Otto Gockman, Steven Selva, and McMullin. As of 2022, this species have also been observed in Alberta, Canada by ecologist Jose Maloles.

== Description ==
Chaenothecopsis penningtonensis sits atop resin on the lower surface of Picea mariana bark flakes. It is dark brown to black in color, thallus absent, and has a very short apothecia. Along with C. resinicola, C. penningtonesis are the only resinicolous species of Chaenothecopsis found in North America with non-septate spores and short apothecia and asci.

== Habitat and distribution ==
Chaenothecopsis penningtonensis reside in temperate peatlands within temperate boreal forests where long, cold and dry winters and short, warm and moist summers occur.

== Etymology ==
The species epithet, penningtonensis, is derived from the location at which this species was discovered, at the Pennington Bog Scientific and Natural Area of Pennington, Minnesota.
