= Chaenothecopsis jordaniana =

Scientific classification
- Domain: Eukaryota
- Kingdom: Fungi
- Division: Ascomycota
- Class: Eurotiomycetes
- Order: Mycocaliciales
- Family: Mycocaliciaceae
- Genus: Chaenothecopsis
- Species: C. jordaniana

Binomial name
- Chaenothecopsis jordaniana Gockman & Selva (2020)

Species of lichen

Chaenothecopsis jordaniana is a species of corticolous (bark-dwelling) pin lichen. Formally described as a new species in 2020 by Otto Gockman and Steven Selva, it is classified in the family Mycocaliciaceae.

== Description ==
The lichen lacks a thallus and can be found on the bark of Eastern White Cedar. Apothecia are singular or in groups of 2–7, black or greenish, and epruinose. Apothecia range from 0.14–0.28 mm tall, and 0.11–0.30 mm across, and have an absent or extremely short stock, 0.02–0.08 mm in diameter; they are visible with a 20X hand lens. Asci are cylindrical, 34–50 μm long and 2.5–4.5 μm wide. Ascospores are septate, pale brown, ellipsoidal, 6.0–10.5 μm long and 2.0–3.0 μm wide.

== Habitat ==
Chaenothecopsis jordaniana is found only in Minnesota. Most commonly located on the bark of the Eastern White Cedar in narrow ridges. The majority of trees it is found on have weathered white and grayish bark. Apothecia are found where grayish bark transitions to a brown hue, similar to younger tree bark.

== Etymology ==
Chaenothecopsis jordaniana is named after Dr. Peter Albion Jordan (1930–2017).
