= Albocalicium =

Scientific classification
- Kingdom: Fungi
- Division: Ascomycota
- Class: Eurotiomycetes
- Order: Mycocaliciales
- Family: Sphinctrinaceae
- Genus: Albocalicium; Haughland (2025)

Genus of fungi

Albocalicium is a genus of fungi from the Sphinctrinaceae family. So far it consists of a single known species.

== Species ==
- Albocalicium candidum

== Description ==
The species was placed in a new class due to morphological differences from similar genera, since classifying it under an existing one would require extending the characteristics of the rank.
