= Chaenothecopsis dibbleandersoniarum =

Scientific classification
- Domain: Eukaryota
- Kingdom: Fungi
- Division: Ascomycota
- Class: Eurotiomycetes
- Order: Mycocaliciales
- Family: Mycocaliciaceae
- Genus: Chaenothecopsis
- Species: C. dibbleandersoniarum

Binomial name
- Chaenothecopsis dibbleandersoniarum Selva (2013)

Species of fungus

Chaenothecopsis dibbleandersoniarum is a species of fungus in the family Mycocaliciaceae. It was described as new to science in 2003 by Steve Selva, from samples collected on Cape Breton Island, Nova Scotia, Canada. It has also been recorded in Maine. The fungus is lichenicolous, and grows as a parasite on the apothecia and thallus of the lichen Arthonia leucopellaea. It is named after Dr. Alison Dibble and Ms. Frances Anderson, both of whom independently brought the species to the attention of Selva.
