= Chaenothecopsis polissica =

Scientific classification
- Domain: Eukaryota
- Kingdom: Fungi
- Division: Ascomycota
- Class: Eurotiomycetes
- Order: Mycocaliciales
- Family: Mycocaliciaceae
- Genus: Chaenothecopsis
- Species: C. polissica

Binomial name
- Chaenothecopsis polissica Heluta & Sukhomlyn (2021)

Species of lichen

Chaenothecopsis polissica is a species of fossilized pin lichen in the family Mycocaliciaceae that was discovered in 2021 by Vasyl Heluta and Maryna Sukhomlyn. The holotype was recovered from Rovno amber, which formed in Ukraine during the late Eocene.
