= Trollskogen =

Nature reserve on Öland, Sweden

Coordinates: 57.3501°N 17.1233°E

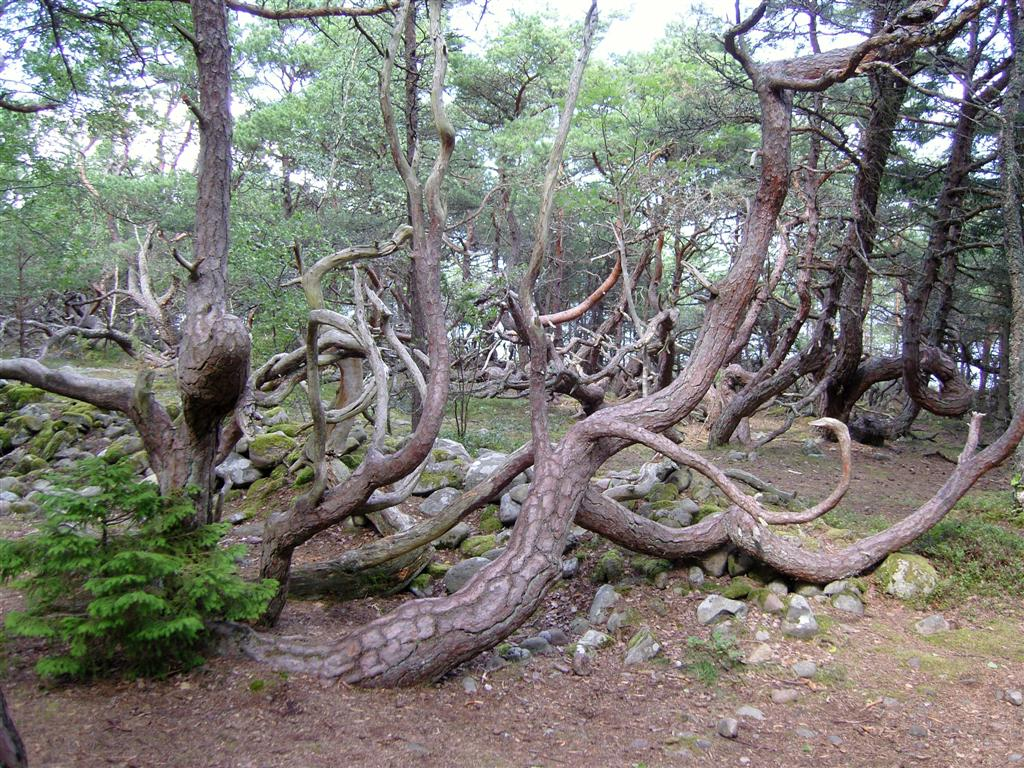
Windswept pines with contorted shapes in Trollskogen

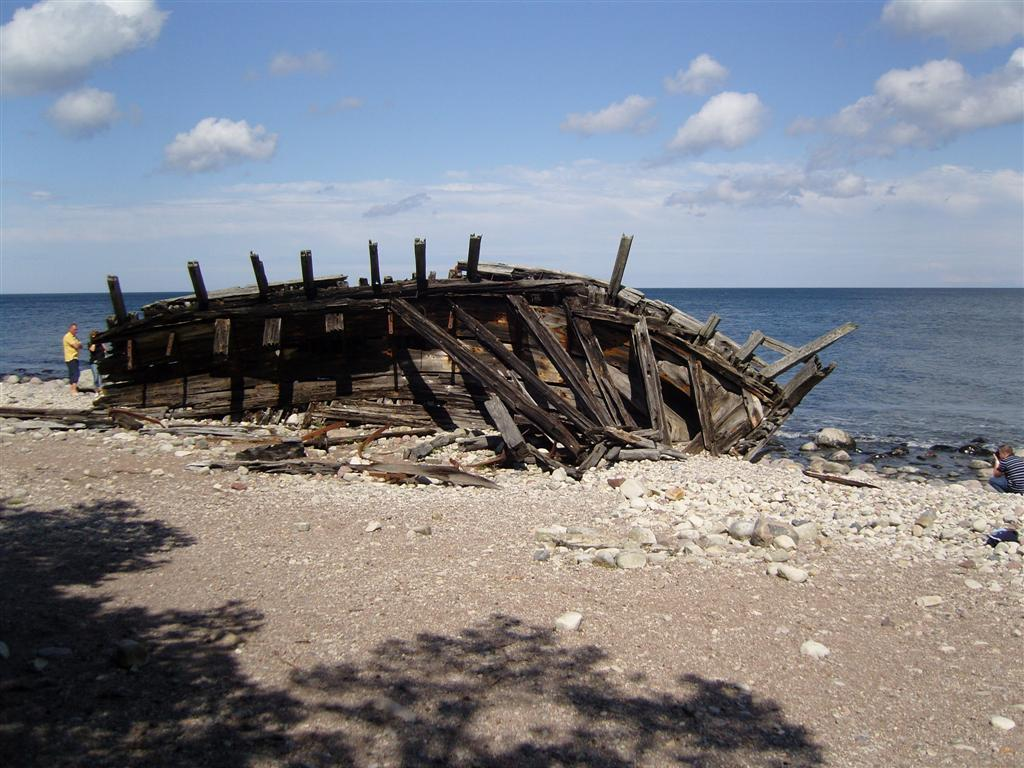
Wreck of the three-masted schooner Swiks

Area map with Trollskogen's boundary in green.

Trollskogen ("enchanted forest" or "troll's forest") is a windswept, grazed pine forest and nature reserve in the northeast corner of the Baltic island Öland, Sweden (Böda socken, Borgholm Municipality). The forest is on a promontory with an exposed shingle beach on the eastern side, the side of the Baltic Sea, and a sheltered bay on the western side, of Grankullaviken bay. The 100-hectare (250-acre) reserve, formerly a Domänreservat (protected by the Swedish government forestry agency), is part of the Böda Kronopark. Its southeastern boundary is also the north border of the nature reserve Bödakusten östra.

== Description ==
Öland has a unique ecology containing many endemic and rare plants not found anywhere else. Trollskogen is characterized by its lichen-covered pine trees; those close to the exposed shore (a shingle beach) have been deformed by the wind. The interior of the forest contains pine trees, up to 200 years old, interspersed with old oaks, a remnant of the former grazing pastures in the Boda forests. Today, cattle still graze here, ensuring the biodiversity of the ecosystem, native grass and herb diversity. The western edge is formed by the grazed and forested areas of the Grankullaviken bay.

The old oaks and pines are a rich habitat for lichens, insects, fungi, and mosses. The rich flora of the reserve includes endangered and rare species such as Pachyphiale carneola, Calicium abietinum, and Sphinctrina. More common plants include burr chervil, Prince's pine, and Baltic wormwood.

== History ==
The oldest human traces in Trollskogen are some 15 cairns and stone circles. Grankullavik, formerly called Örboviken, was a naval base in the 15th century, dominating much of the central Baltic Sea. Traces of fortifications remain to the east and west, and a stone wall (possibly used to demarcate a hunting domain), some 230 feet (70 m) long and dating from the reign of King John III (1537–1592), remains to the south.

The eastern shore is the site of the wreck of the Swiks, a schooner that was wrecked on the coast on 21 December 1926; its crew of seven escaped in a lifeboat.

== Visitor information ==
The area has three hiking trails, with signage, one of which is accessible for strollers. A nature center at the parking area provides information on the area and its surroundings.
