= Phaeocalicium curtisii =

Scientific classification
- Kingdom: Fungi
- Division: Ascomycota
- Class: Eurotiomycetes
- Order: Mycocaliciales
- Family: Mycocaliciaceae
- Genus: Phaeocalicium
- Species: P. curtisii

Binomial name
- Phaeocalicium curtisii (Tuck) Tibell, 1975

Species of ascomycete fungus

Phaeocalicium curtisii is a non-lichenized ascomycete fungus in the family Mycocaliciaceae.

== Description ==
The fungus forms pin-like fruiting bodies that resemble burnt matchsticks on the bark of sumac species, especially staghorn sumac, Rhus typhina. These apothecia are 0.51 to 0.57 mm tall on average, smooth, and consist of a dark-brown to black stalk topped by an obconic (upside-down cone) to cup-shaped excipulum or head.

Spores are produced in single lines of 8 within cylindrical asci. They are 1-septate with two compartments, brown, elliptic (long-oval) to elongate (rounded rod) in form, and typically measure 14.52 x 5.76 μm on average. Their surfaces are papillate (blunt-spined) to areolate (dotted) and they are variably constricted at the septa.

== Distribution ==
The fungus is known to northeastern North America.
