= Phaeocalicium atenitikon =

Scientific classification
- Kingdom: Fungi
- Division: Ascomycota
- Class: Eurotiomycetes
- Order: Mycocaliciales
- Family: Mycocaliciaceae
- Genus: Phaeocalicium
- Species: P. atenitikon

Binomial name
- Phaeocalicium atenitikon Ladd and C.A. Morse

Species of fungus

Phaeocalicium atenitikon is a non-lichenized ascomycete fungus in the family Mycocaliciaceae. Like other members of Phaeocalicium, the fungus forms pin-like fruiting bodies that resemble burnt matchsticks, but it is restricted to the bark of black walnut, Juglans nigra, where it sprouts from smooth sections of small twigs typically less than 1 cm (0.39 in) in diameter.

== Description ==
Apothecia are 0.19 to 0.30 mm (0.0075 to 0.0118 in) tall on average, and consist of a mostly dark-brown to black stalk with a pale base topped by an excipulum (head) shaped like a squat cylinder or an upside-down egg.

Spores are produced in cylindrical asci 65 - 90μm long and 4.6 - 8.0 μm wide on average. The spores themselves are generally 9.8 x 4.0 μm, and are 1-septate, greenish-gray in color, and irregularly areolate in texture, though they appear merely smooth to slightly rough-textured under regular light microscopy.

== Distribution ==
The fungus is so far known only to North America in the eastern Great Plains and lower Midwest regions of the United States. Specifically, published observations and collections are limited to Illinois, Kansas, and Missouri.

== Etymology ==
While the genus derives its name from the ancient Greek φαιός (phaiós) meaning dark and "calicium", a reference to the unrelated but visually similar genus Calicium, the species epithet "atenitikon" is derived from the Greek ἁτἐνισις (atenisis) meaning "straining of the eyesight", a reference to the diminutive size of the fruiting bodies and how difficult they are to find in the field.
