= Brevicalicium =

Scientific classification
- Kingdom: Fungi
- Division: Ascomycota
- Class: Eurotiomycetes
- Order: Mycocaliciales
- Family: Sphinctrinaceae
- Genus: Brevicalicium; Haughland (2025)

Genus of fungi

Brevicalicium is a genus of fungi from the Sphinctrinaceae family. So far it consists of a single known species.

== Species ==
- Brevicalicium roseum

== Etymology ==
The genus name brevi- is derived from the Latin brevus, meaning "short".
