= Bedroom Eyes =

Bedroom Eyes may refer to:

- Bedroom Eyes (film), a 1984 thriller film starring Kip Gilman and Barbara Law
- Bedroom Eyes (musician), indie pop singer and songwriter Jonas Jonsson
- "Bedroom Eyes" (song), 1989 song by Australian singer Kate Ceberano
- A facial expression often associated with sexual desire.
