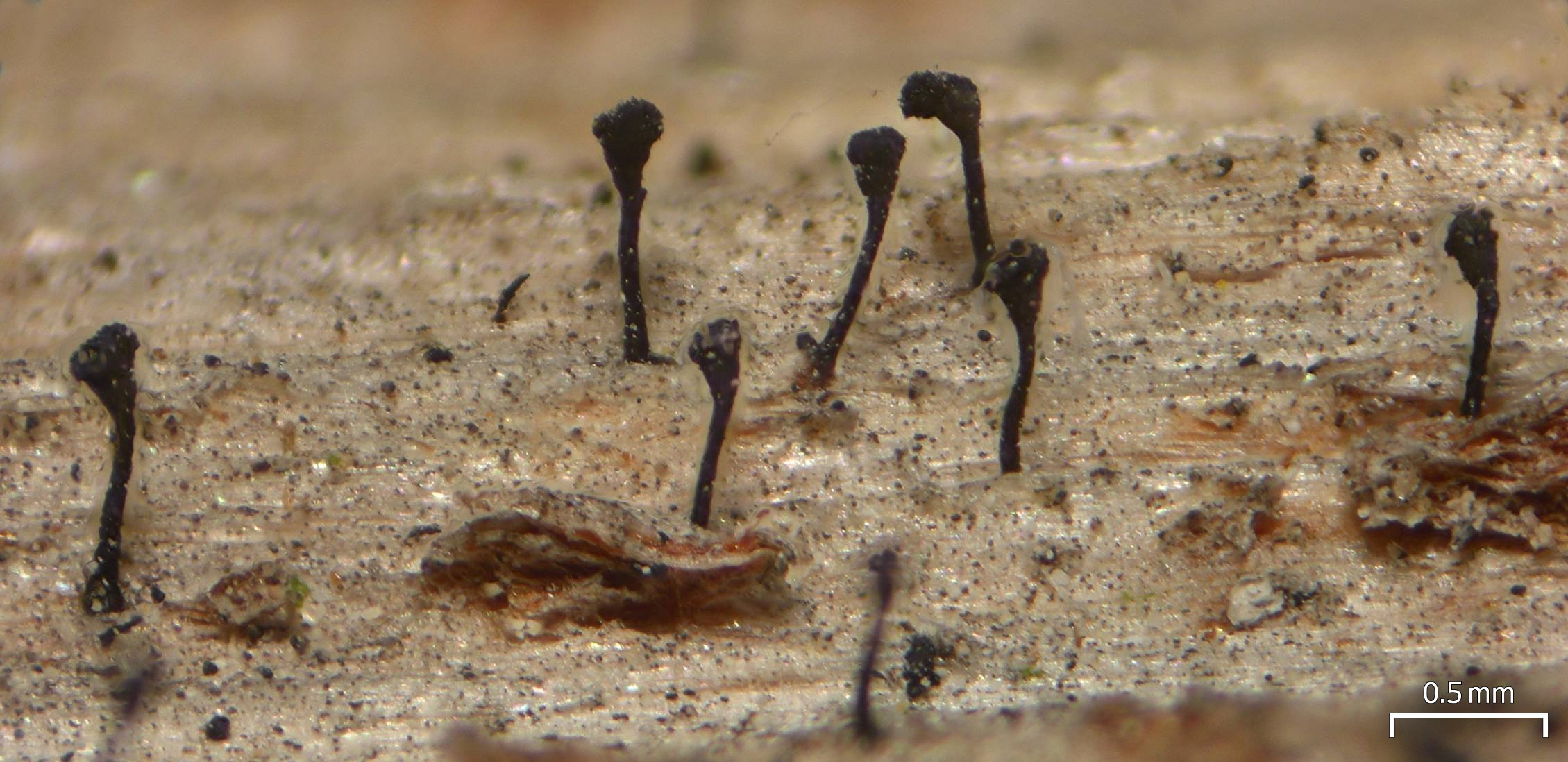
- Chaenothecopsis norstictica

Scientific classification
- Kingdom: Fungi
- Division: Ascomycota
- Class: Eurotiomycetes
- Order: Mycocaliciales
- Family: Mycocaliciaceae
- Genus: Chaenothecopsis; Vain. (1927)

Type species
- Chaenothecopsis rubescens Vain. (1927)

Synonyms
- Calicium sect. Chaenothecopsis (Vain.) Oxner (1956)

= Chaenothecopsis =

Genus of lichen-forming fungi

Chaenothecopsis is a genus of about 40 species of pin lichens in the family Mycocaliciaceae.

== Taxonomy ==
The genus was circumscribed in 1927 by Finnish lichenologist Edvard August Vainio, with Chaenothecopsis rubescens assigned as the type species.

== Ecology ==
Many of the species are resinicolous, meaning they grow on conifer resin or other plant exudates. Most common host plants are trees in the genera Abies, Picea, and Tsuga. In contrast, Chaenothecopsis kilimanjaroensis is a lichenicolous lichen, meaning it grows on the thalli of other lichens–sometimes as a parasically, sometimes commensally.

== Species ==
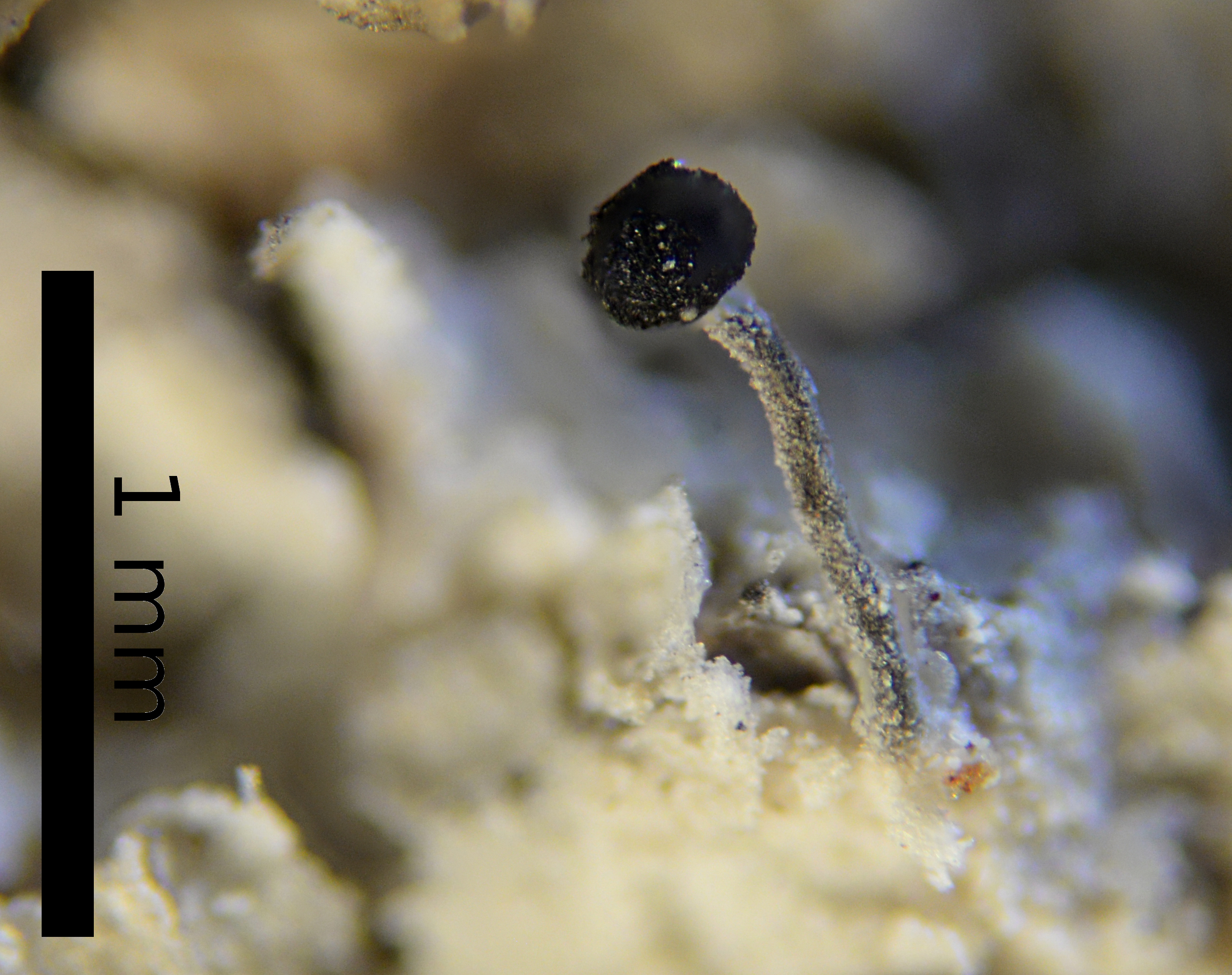
Chaenothecopsis viridialba

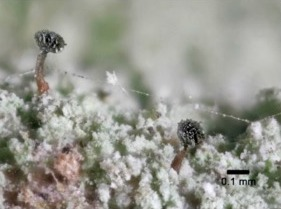
Chaenothecopsis kilimanjaroensis

- Chaenothecopsis abscondita Maloles (2025)
- Chaenothecopsis aeruginosa Goward & E.B.Peterson (2016)
- Chaenothecopsis australis Tibell (1998)
- Chaenothecopsis bitterfeldensis Rikkinen & Poinar (2000)
- Chaenothecopsis brevipes Tibell (1987)
- Chaenothecopsis caelumsaltator Selva, Haughland & Maloles (2025)
- Chaenothecopsis caespitosa (W.Phillips) D.Hawksw. (1980)
- Chaenothecopsis calicii-viridis Selva, Haughland & Maloles (2025)
- Chaenothecopsis caucasica Titov (2006)
- Chaenothecopsis claydenii Selva & Tuovila (2016)
- Chaenothecopsis debilis (Sm.) Tibell (1975)
- Chaenothecopsis diabolica Rikkinen & Tuovila (2011)
- Chaenothecopsis dibbleandersoniarum Selva (2013)
- Chaenothecopsis calicii-viridis Selva, Haughland & Maloles (2025)
- Chaenothecopsis epithallina Tibell (1975)
- Chaenothecopsis eugenia Titov (2001)
- Chaenothecopsis fennica (Laurila) Tibell (1978)
- Chaenothecopsis formosa Titov (2006)
- Chaenothecopsis golubkovae Tibell & Titov (1993)
- Chaenothecopsis haematopus Tibell (1987)
- Chaenothecopsis hendersonii Selva (2023)
- Chaenothecopsis heterospora Titov (2006)
- Chaenothecopsis himalayensis (Räsänen) Tibell & Titov (2000)
- Chaenothecopsis hospitans (Th.Fr.) Tibell (1995)
- Chaenothecopsis hunanensis Rikkinen & Tuovila (2014)
- Chaenothecopsis inconspicua – Europe
- Chaenothecopsis jordaniana Gockman, Selva, McMullin (2020)
- Chaenothecopsis kalbii Tibell & K.Ryman (1995)
- Chaenothecopsis khayensis Rikkinen & Tuovila (2011) - Ghana
- Chaenothecopsis kilimanjaroensis Temu & Tibell (2019) – Tanzania
- Chaenothecopsis leifiana Titov, Kuzn. & Himelbr. (2004)
- Chaenothecopsis lignicola (Nádv.) A.F.W.Schmidt (1970)
- Chaenothecopsis marcineae Selva (2013)
- Chaenothecopsis mediorossica Titov & Gudov. (2006)
- Chaenothecopsis minganensis Bell-Doyon, Selva & McMullin (2023)
- Chaenothecopsis montana Rikkinen (2003)
- Chaenothecopsis nana Tibell (1979)
- Chaenothecopsis neocaledonica Rikkinen, Tuovila & A.R.Schmidt (2014) – New Caledonia
- Chaenothecopsis nigra Tibell (1987)
- Chaenothecopsis nigripunctata Rikkinen (2003) – western North America
- Chaenothecopsis nigropedata Tibell (1987)
- Chaenothecopsis nivea (F.Wilson) Tibell (1987)
- Chaenothecopsis oregana Rikkinen (2003)
- Chaenothecopsis orientalis Tibell (2005)
- Chaenothecopsis pallida Rikkinen & Tuovila (2014)
- Chaenothecopsis parasitaster (Bagl. & Carestia) D.Hawksw. (1978)
- Chaenothecopsis perforata Rikkinen & Tuovila (2014)
- Chaenothecopsis penningtonensis Gockman, Selva, McMullin (2020)
- †Chaenothecopsis polissica Heluta & Sukhomlyn (2021)
- Chaenothecopsis proliferata Rikkinen, A.R.Schmidt & Tuovila (2012) – China
- Chaenothecopsis pusilla (Ach.) A.F.W.Schmidt (1970)
- Chaenothecopsis pusiola (Ach.) Vain. (1927)
- Chaenothecopsis quintralis Messuti, Amico, Lorenzo & Vidal-Russ. (2012)
- Chaenothecopsis resinophila Rikkinen & Tuovila (2014)
- Chaenothecopsis retinens (Nyl.) Tibell (1991)
- Chaenothecopsis rubescens Vain. (1927)
- Chaenothecopsis sagenidii Tibell (1987)
- Chaenothecopsis sanguinea Tibell (1987)
- Chaenothecopsis savonica (Räsänen) Tibell (1984)
- Chaenothecopsis schefflerae (Samuels & D.E.Buchanan) Tibell (1987)
- Chaenothecopsis sinensis Titov (2006)
- Chaenothecopsis subparoica (Nyl.) Tibell (1995)
- Chaenothecopsis subpusilla (Vain.) Tibell (1975)
- Chaenothecopsis tasmanica Tibell (1985)
- Chaenothecopsis tibellii Titov (2000)
- Chaenothecopsis tigillaris (Berk. & Broome) D.Hawksw. (2014)
- Chaenothecopsis transbaikalica Titov (2006)
- Chaenothecopsis vainioana (Nádv.) Tibell (1979)
- Chaenothecopsis vinosa Titov (2001)
- Chaenothecopsis viridialba (Kremp.) A.F.W.Schmidt (1970)
- Chaenothecopsis viridireagens (Nádv.) A.F.W.Schmidt (1970)
- Chaenothecopsis weiana Titov (2001)
- Chaenothecopsis yukonensis Huaughland & Maloles (2025)
- Chaenothecopsis zebrina Rikkinen & Tuovila (2011)
