= Brunneocarpos =

Scientific classification
- Kingdom: Fungi
- Division: Ascomycota
- Class: Eurotiomycetes
- Order: Mycocaliciales
- Family: Mycocaliciaceae
- Genus: Brunneocarpos; A.Giraldo & Crous (2016)
- Species: B. banksiae

Binomial name
- Brunneocarpos banksiae A.Giraldo & Crous (2016)

Species of lichen

Brunneocarpos is a fungal genus in the family Mycocaliciaceae. It is a monotypic genus, containing the single species Brunneocarpos banksiae. The fungus grows on the cones of Banksia plants in Australia.

== Taxonomy ==
Both the genus and the species were described as new to science in 2016 by Alejandra Giraldo and Pedro Willem Crous. The generic name combines the Latin brunneus ("brown") with the Ancient Greek carpos ("fruit"), while the specific epithet refers to the host genus Banksia. The type specimen was collected on a cone of Banksia attenuata in Western Australia.

Molecular phylogenetic analysis showed the fungus to be placed in the family Mycocaliciaceae, whose species have a similar morphology.

== Description ==
Brunneocarpos banksiae produces tiny, stiped fruitbodies that grow among the floral bracts on Banksia cones. They have a dark brown, roughly spherical capitulum (a spore-bearing "head" atop the stipe) measuring 150–285 by 125–206 μm. A layer of hyaline (translucent) mycelium covers the capitulum in older specimens. Its asci are eight-spored, cylindrical, and measure 30–34 by 4–5 μm. They produce brown ascospores with walls that are smooth and thick, with dimensions of 4.5–7 by 2–3.5 μm. When grown in culture, the fungus produces a chlamydospore-like asexual morph.
