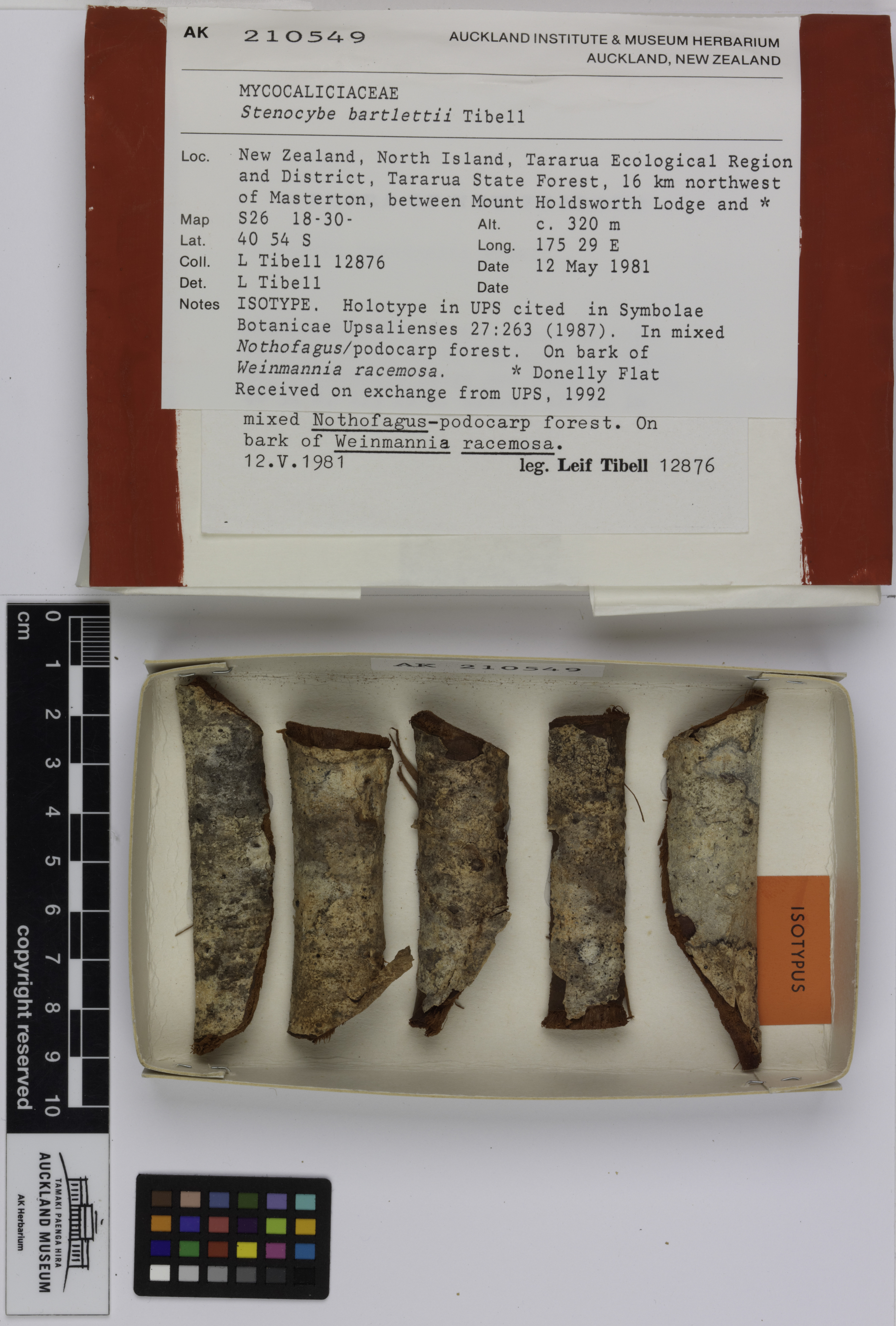
- Herbarium specimen of Stenocybe bartlettii

Scientific classification
- Domain: Eukaryota
- Kingdom: Fungi
- Division: Ascomycota
- Class: Eurotiomycetes
- Order: Mycocaliciales
- Family: Mycocaliciaceae
- Genus: Stenocybe; Nyl. ex Körb. (1855)

Type species
- Stenocybe byssacea (Fr.) Körb. (1855)

= Stenocybe =

Genus of fungi

Stenocybe is a genus of fungi in the family Mycocaliciaceae. It has 14 species.

== Species ==
- Stenocybe bartlettii Tibell (1987)
- Stenocybe clavata Tibell (1991)
- Stenocybe euspora (Nyl.) Anzi (1860)
- Stenocybe flexuosa Selva & Tibell (1999) – North America
- Stenocybe fragmenta E.B.Peterson & Rikkinen (1998)
- Stenocybe major Nyl. ex Körb. (1855)
- Stenocybe mildeana (Arnold) Jatta (1900)
- Stenocybe montana Titov (2006)
- Stenocybe nitida (Mont.) R.Heim (1941)
- Stenocybe procrastinata E.B.Peterson (2021) – western North America
- Stenocybe pullatula (Ach.) Stein (1879)
- Stenocybe septata (Leight.) A.Massal. (1860)
- Stenocybe spinosae Velen. (1939)
- Stenocybe tropica Aptroot (2015) – Brazil
