= Bodan =

Bodan may refer to:

- Bodan Arsovski, a Macedonian musician
- Bodan Shonendan, the Japanese name for the Korean musical group BTS
- Bodan-Werft, a German company
- Bođani, a village in Serbia
- Chitpavan § Bodan, a ceremony practiced by the Chitpavan community in India

== See also ==
- Boda (disambiguation)
- Bohdan (disambiguation)
- Bogdan
