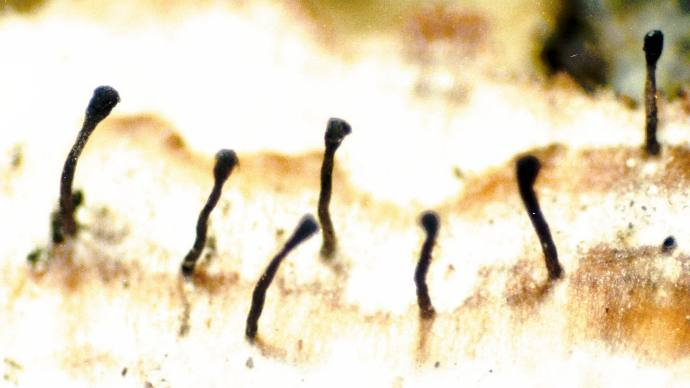
- Phaeocalicium polyporaeum pins

Scientific classification
- Domain: Eukaryota
- Kingdom: Fungi
- Division: Ascomycota
- Class: Eurotiomycetes
- Order: Mycocaliciales
- Family: Mycocaliciaceae
- Genus: Phaeocalicium
- Species: P. polyporaeum

Binomial name
- Phaeocalicium polyporaeum (Nyl.) Tibell (1979)

Synonyms
- Calicium polyporaeum Nyl. (1875)

= Phaeocalicium polyporaeum =

Species of fungus

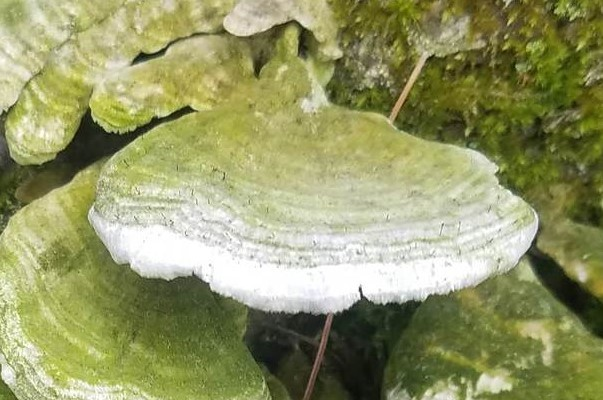
Phaeocalicium polyporaeum

Phaeocalicium polyporaeum, the fairy pin or common pin, is a species of non-lichenized fungus in the genus Phaeocalicium. They grow to a maximum size of 2.5 mm and resemble black matchsticks, with thin stalks and wider caps, in groups or rows primarily on the caps of Trichaptum biforme. Fairy pins are a type of parasitic fungi that grow primarily on the caps of Trichaptum biforme, but have also been reported on Trametes versicolor. They often co-occur on the upper side of caps with green algae on host fungi.

Fairy pins can be distinguished from other species of Phaeocalicium by their spores, which are very pale brown.

== Distribution ==
Fairy pins are found in Europe, Siberia, and are common in the eastern United States as well as other parts of North America. The distribution is limited by the substrate distribution, rather than by other factors.

== Description ==
Fairy pins can vary in appearance considerably, particularly their apothecia. The apothecia can be rounded in the form of an inverted cone and quite small, but other times they are biconvex and significantly larger in diameter in the stalk. Typically, the apothecia appear individually and are between 0.5 and 0.8 mm, but are scattered over the upper surface of shared host fungi. The stalks are a greenish brown and is unbranched, with hyphae arranged parallel to the surface of the host.
