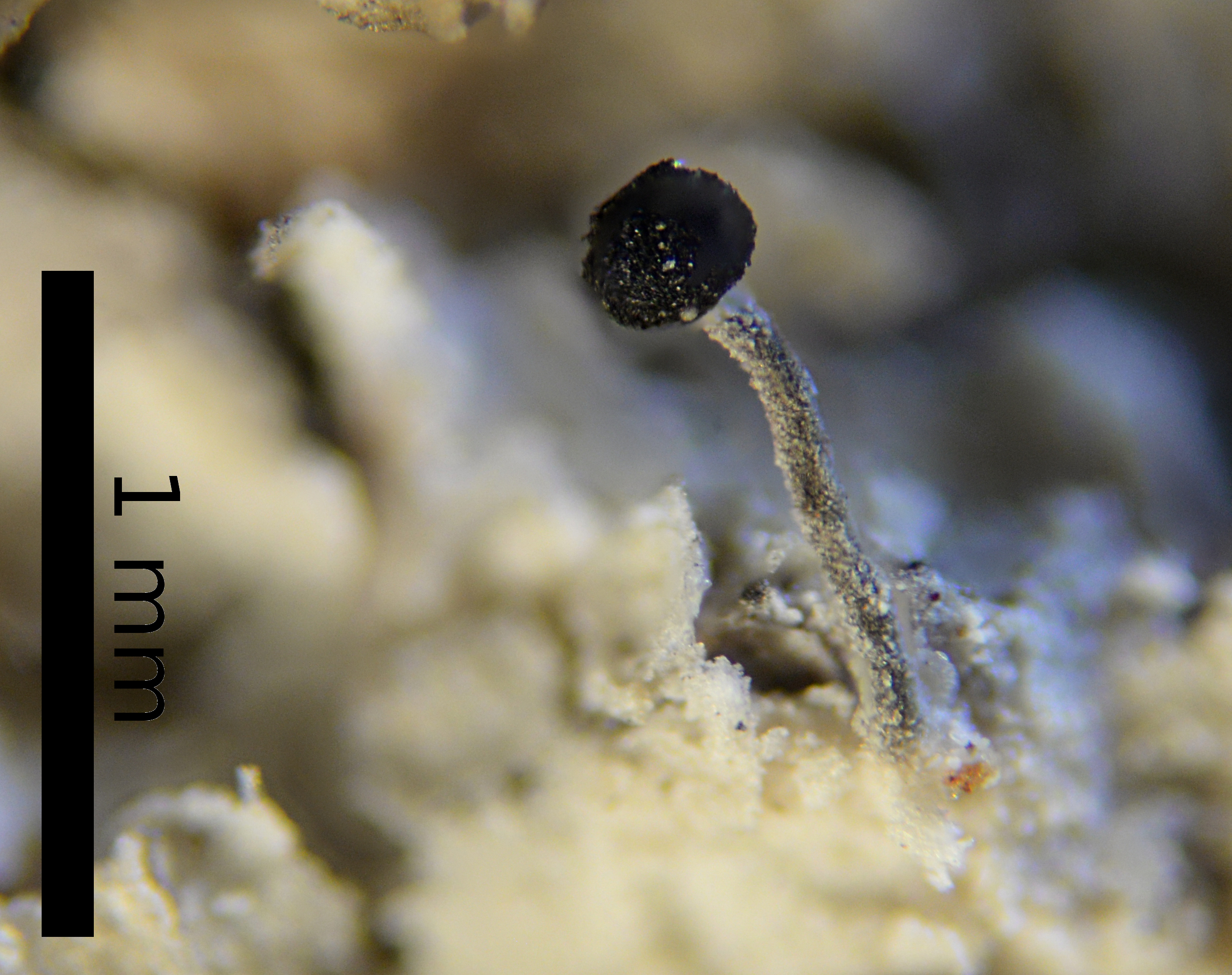

Scientific classification
- Domain: Eukaryota
- Kingdom: Fungi
- Division: Ascomycota
- Class: Eurotiomycetes
- Order: Mycocaliciales
- Family: Mycocaliciaceae
- Genus: Chaenothecopsis
- Species: C. viridialba

Binomial name
- Chaenothecopsis viridialba (Kremp.) Alb.Schmidt (1970)

Synonyms
- Calicium viridialbum Kremp. (1871)

= Chaenothecopsis viridialba =

Species of lichen

Chaenothecopsis viridialba is a species of lichen belonging to the family Mycocaliciaceae.

It has a cosmopolitan distribution.
