= Swiks =

Three-masted schooner built in 1902

Coordinates: 57.351494°N 17.127748°E

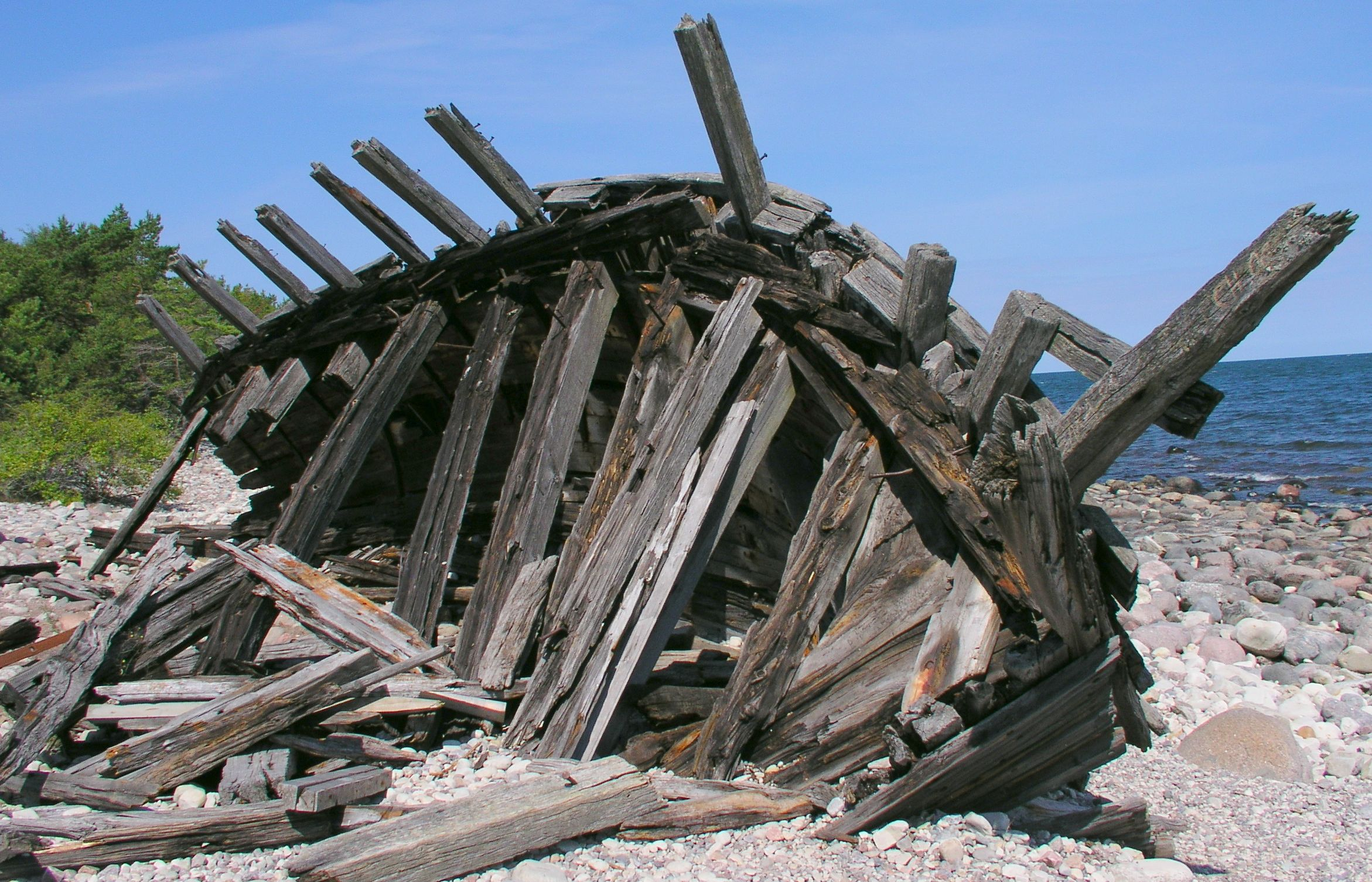
- The Swix's shipwreck

History

Latvia
- Name: Swiks
- Operator: Indrik S. Puhlin
- Port of registry: (Latvia) Riga
- Builder: K. Karkle
- Launched: 1902

History

Åland
- Name: Swiks
- Owner: J.E. Johansson (1914–1916), J.M. Andersson (1916-1924), A Lundqvist (1924–1926)
- Port of registry: (Åland) Vårdö
- Acquired: 1914
- Fate: Wrecked off Trollskogen, 21 December 1926

General characteristics
- Class & type: Schooner
- Tonnage: 227 NRT
- Length: 34.4 m (112 ft 10 in)
- Beam: 8.65 m (28 ft 5 in)
- Sail plan: Three masts

Wreck and surroundings.

The Swiks (or Swix) was a three-masted schooner from Åland that sank in the Baltic Sea, off the island of Öland, Sweden, on 21 December 1926.

== History ==
Swiks was built in Upesgriva (between Ventspils and Riga; see Mērsrags), Latvia in 1902, by K. Karkle for Indrik S. Puhlin from Riga. Puhlins nickname was "Svikis" ("super durable"); hence probably the ship's name.

Puhlin operated the ship until 1912, when it was taken over by a partnership with J.E. Johansson as the principal owner and after 1916 with J.M. Andersson; she was based in Vårdö in Åland. She was then sold to Arthur Lundqvist in 1924.

== Characteristics ==
She was made from pine and oak fastened with galvanized iron bolts, and measured 34.4 m (112 ft 10 in) in length with a beam of 8.65 m (28 ft 5 in). She had a net tonnage of 227 tons and the payload of 135 virke.

== Wreck ==
The ship, with a crew of seven, was sailing from Flensburg, Germany to her homeport, Mariehamn, with only ballast on board. A snowstorm forced the ship to try to round north of Öland, to seek shelter in Kalmar, but the rounding attempt failed and the ship got stuck in the sand dunes below the water (Änggärdsudden) near the beach of Trollskogen. The crew abandoned ship and got to land in a lifeboat, walking through the forest of Trollskogen before reaching Grankullavik, where they were cared for a week. One crew member had gotten blood poisoning from a rusty nail and was cared for in hospital.

The wreck of the Swiks lay off the beach until a winter storm in the 1950s threw her up on the beach, where she broke in two. Some farmers from Böda bought it hoping to be able to salvage the wood and iron, but this proved too costly. In 1977 one of the sides was still intact.
