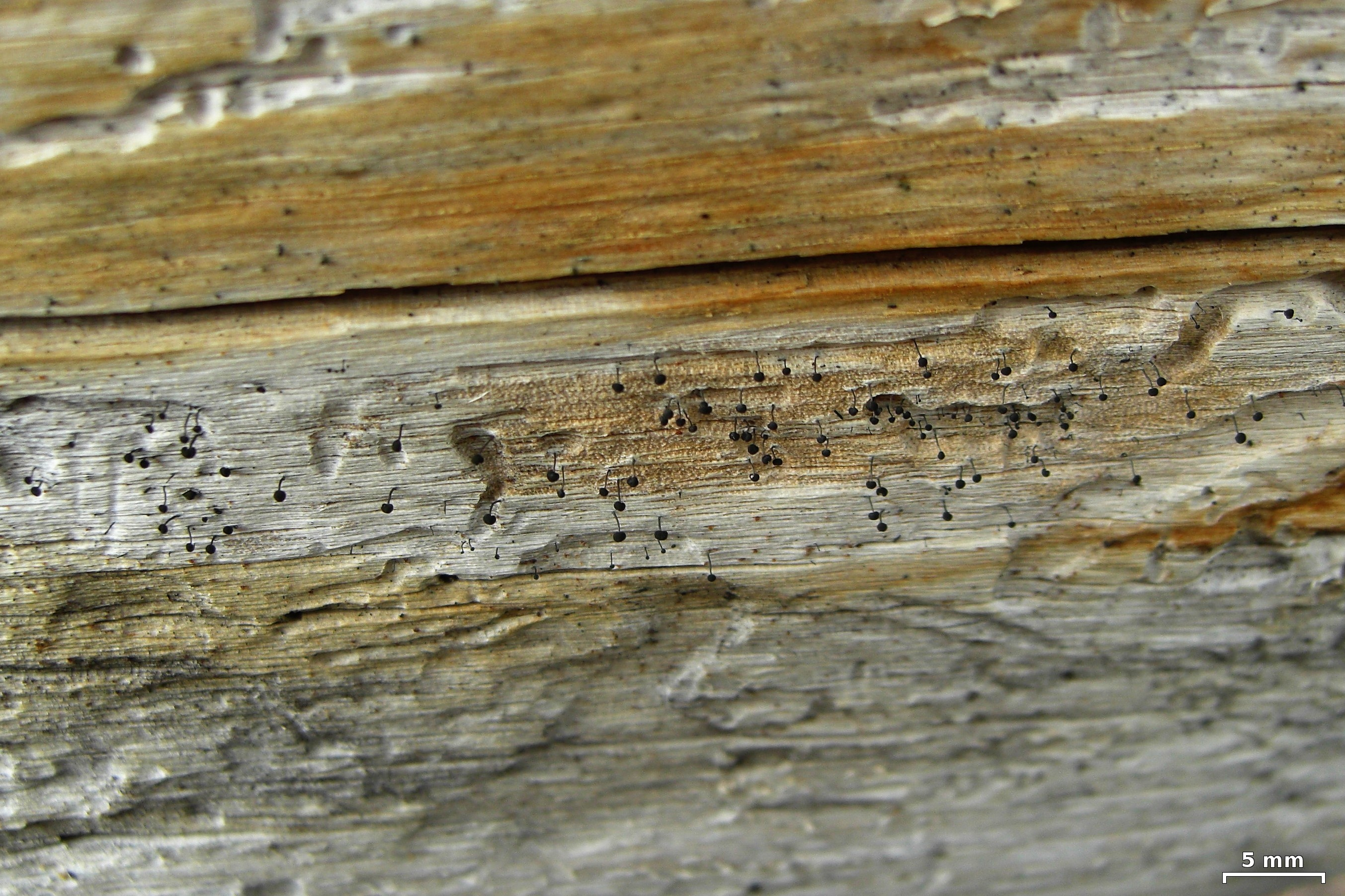
- Mycocalicium subtile found in Lemhi Range, Idaho, United States

Scientific classification
- Domain: Eukaryota
- Kingdom: Fungi
- Division: Ascomycota
- Class: Eurotiomycetes
- Order: Mycocaliciales
- Family: Mycocaliciaceae
- Genus: Mycocalicium; Vain. (1890)

Type species
- Mycocalicium parietinum (Ach.) Vain. (1890)

Species
- M. chiodectonicola M. enterographicola M. hyaloparvicellulum M. llimonae M. rapax M. subtile

Synonyms
- Sphinctrinella Nádv. (1942)

= Mycocalicium =

Genus of fungi

Mycocalicium is a genus of fungi in the family Mycocaliciaceae. The genus was circumscribed by Finnish lichenologist Edvard August Vainio in 1890.

== Species ==
- Mycocalicium chiodectonicola Aptroot & Etayo (2017) – Panama
- Mycocalicium enterographicola Aptroot & M.Cáceres (2015) – Brazil
- Mycocalicium hyaloparvicellulum Daranag. & K.D.Hyde (2015) – Italy
- Mycocalicium llimonae Hladún & D.Muñiz (2007) – Iberian Peninsula
- Mycocalicium rapax Tibell (2001) – Africa
- Mycocalicium subtile (Pers.) Szatala (1925)
