= Gäle Virgin Forest Nature Reserve =

Nature reserve in Sweden

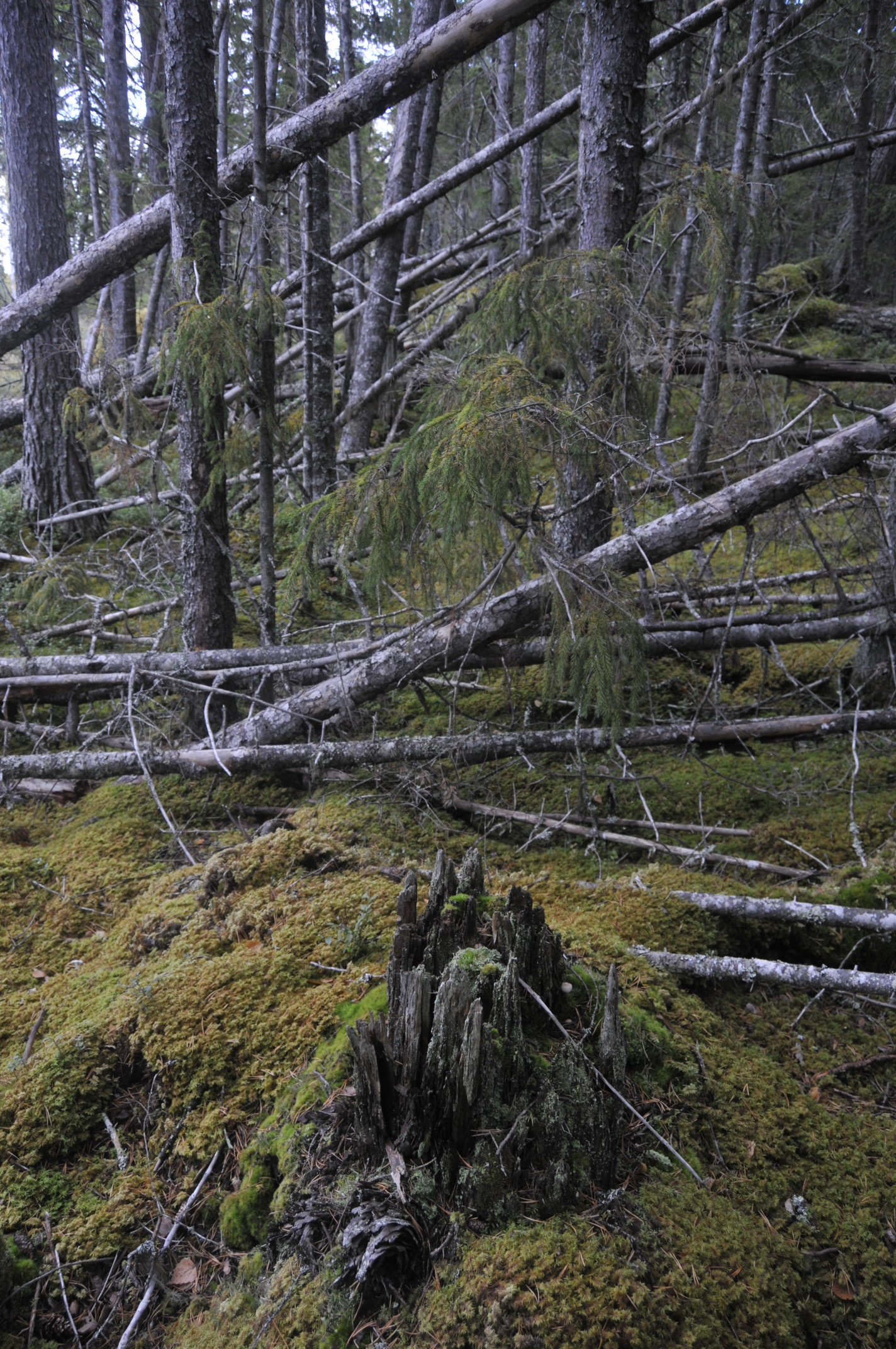

- Location within Jämtland Location within Sweden
- Location: Sweden
- Nearest city: Östersund
- Coordinates: 62°55′42″N 14°42′28″E
- Area: 13 ha (32 acres)
- Established: 2005

Gäle Virgin Forest Nature Reserve (Swedish: Gäle naturskogs naturreservat) is a nature reserve in Jämtland County in Sweden.

The nature reserve protects an area of surviving old-growth forest dominated by spruce in a landscape otherwise heavily forested. Trees up to 300 years old grow in the reserve. The unspoilt forest with its coarse woody debris provides a habitat for several red listed or unusual species such as Schismatomma pericleum, Chaenothecopsis viridialba, Haploporus odorus and Anomoporia bombycina.
