= Pyrgidium =

Scientific classification
- Kingdom: Fungi
- Division: Ascomycota
- Class: Eurotiomycetes
- Order: Mycocaliciales
- Family: Sphinctrinaceae
- Genus: Pyrgidium; Nyl.

Type species
- Pyrgidium bengaliense Nyl.

Genus of fungi

Pyrgidium is a genus of fungi within the Sphinctrinaceae family.
