= La Boda =

La Boda (Spanish "The Wedding") may refer to:

- La boda (Goya), 1792 painting
- La Boda (1964 film), Argentine film
- La Boda (1982 film), Venezuelan film
- "La Boda", single by Marisol (actress) 1967
- "La Boda" (song), a song by Aventura from the album God's Project

== See also ==
- Boda (disambiguation)
