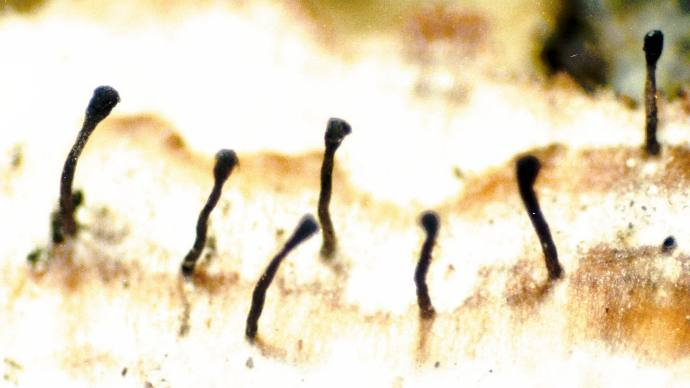
- Phaeocalicium polyporaeum

Scientific classification
- Kingdom: Fungi
- Division: Ascomycota
- Class: Eurotiomycetes
- Order: Mycocaliciales
- Family: Mycocaliciaceae
- Genus: Phaeocalicium; A.F.W.Schmidt (1970)

Type species
- Phaeocalicium praecedens (Nyl.) A.F.W.Schmidt (1970)

= Phaeocalicium =

Genus of fungi

Phaeocalicium is a genus of fungi in the family Mycocaliciaceae. The genus was circumscribed in 1970 by German lichenologist Alexander Schmidt, with Phaeocalicium praecedens assigned as the type species.

== Species ==
- Phaeocalicium ahtii (Titov & Baibul.) Titov (2001)
- Phaeocalicium alnophilum Haughland (2025)
- Phaeocalicium asciiforme Tibell (1987)
- Phaeocalicium atenitikon Ladd & Morse (2022)
- Phaeocalicium betulinum (Nyl.) Tibell (1991)
- Phaeocalicium boreale Tibell (1996)
- Phaeocalicium compressulum (Nyl. ex Vain.) A.F.W.Schmidt (1970)
- Phaeocalicium curtisii (Tuck.) Tibell (1975)
- Phaeocalicium flabelliforme Tibell (1996)
- Phaeocalicium fuegensis Tibell (1998)
- Phaeocalicium gracile Titov (2006)
- Phaeocalicium interruptum (Nyl.) Tibell (1991)
- Phaeocalicium matthewsianum Selva & Tibell (1999)
- Phaeocalicium mildeanum (Hepp) Puntillo (2001)
- Phaeocalicium minutissimum (G.Merr.) Selva (1999)
- Phaeocalicium pinaceum Titov (1986)
- Phaeocalicium polyporaeum (Nyl.) Tibell (1979)
- Phaeocalicium populneum (Brond. ex Duby) A.F.W.Schmidt (1970)
- Phaeocalicium praecedens (Nyl.) A.F.W.Schmidt (1970)
- Phaeocalicium tibellii Kalb (1992)
- Phaeocalicium tibetanicum Titov (2000)
- Phaeocalicium tremulicola (Norrl. ex Nyl.) Tibell (1996)
- Phaeocalicium triseptatum Tibell (2014)
