= Kronopark =

Type of forest park in Sweden

A Kronopark ("crown park"), in Sweden, is a forest or forested area owned by the state (formerly, the "crown") who has access to it and can develop it for various purposes. They are managed by Sveaskog or by Statens fastighetsverk (the National Property Board of Sweden).

In 1994 the total area covered by Kronoparks amounted to about 4.5 million hectares, almost 90% of which in Norrland and Dalarna. Starting in the 1870s the government began establishing the parks to limit the number of settlements that were being established on government-owned lands, though in the 1900s land in the individual Kronoparks was allotted to individual tenants. Kronoparks were established in Svealand and Götaland mainly through acquisitions of land by the state. By 1905 there were 1082 Kronoparks in Sweden.

During the past decades the area owned by the state has declined by about 5%, because parliament decided that Sveaskog should sell parts of its forest holdings to strengthen private forestry.
