= Böda Church =

- Böda kyrka
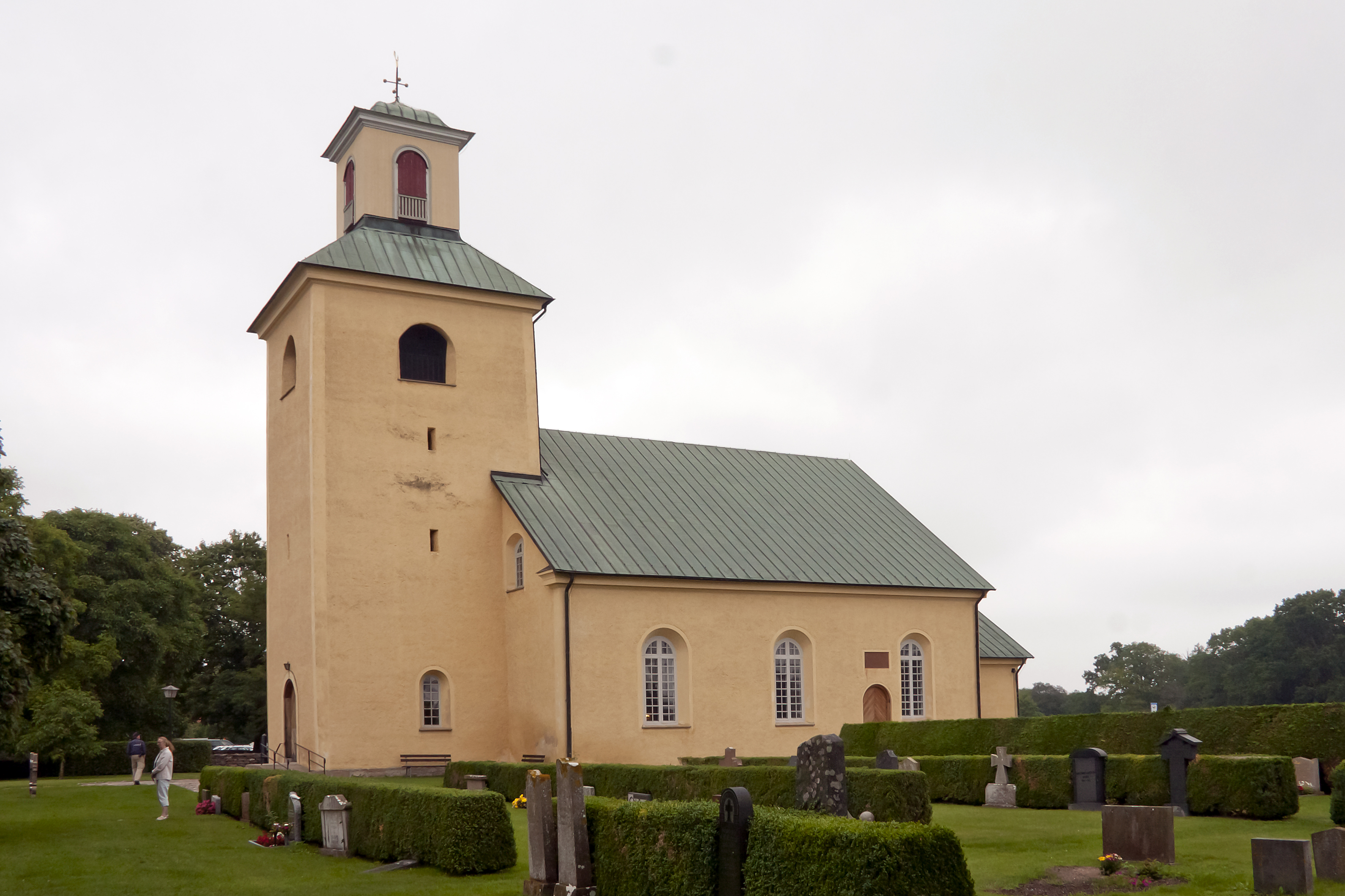
- Böda Church, external view

- Location in Kalmar County
- 57°14′40″N 17°03′35″E
- Location: Böda socken
- Country: Sweden
- Denomination: Church of Sweden

Administration
- Diocese: Växjö

Böda Church (Swedish: Böda kyrka) is a Lutheran church in Böda socken on the Swedish island Öland, in the Baltic Sea. It belongs to the Diocese of Växjö.

== History and architecture ==
Böda Church was built during the second half of the 12th century as a Romanesque church with nave, a narrower choir and apse. During the late 12th and early 13th century, the church was rebuilt into a fortified church. During the reconstruction, the apse was removed and the nave and choir made equally broad.

The church was almost completely rebuilt 1801–03. The new church incorporates a few medieval elements, notably the Romanesque north portal. The church furnishings are post-Reformation works of art.
