= Böda kronopark =

Forest park in Öland, Sweden

Coordinates: 57.2600°N 17.0000°E

Kronopark indicated in green.

Böda kronopark is a Kronopark and currently an Ekopark on Öland, Sweden, north of the village of Böda. It has 6000 hectares of mainly coniferous forest and takes up most of the northern part of Öland, except for the northwestern tip. Its eastern boundary is the Baltic Sea, with a ten-kilometer long sandy beach. The park was a royal hunting domain and then became part of the Domänverket. In 2006 the park became an Ekopark, meaning a park run by a forestry company (in this case Sveaskog), comparable to a nature reserve but with fewer regulations and allowing for the harvesting of lumber.
