= Bridge of Don Academy =

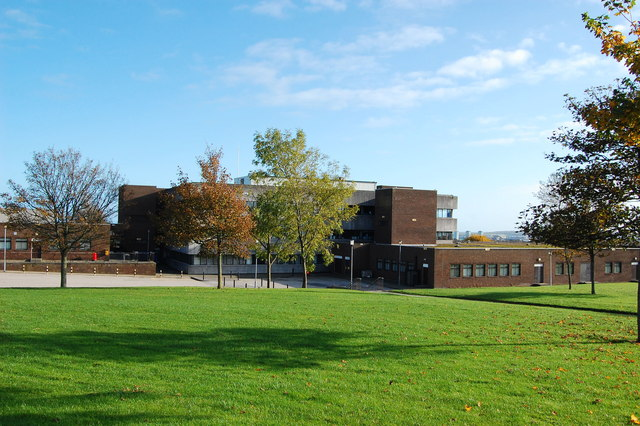

Location
- Braehead Way; Bridge of Don, Aberdeen, AB22 8RR; Scotland; 57.1846°N 2.1113°W

Information
- Type: Secondary school
- Motto: "Be Caring, Be Honest, Be Respectful, Be Your Best."
- Established: 1979
- Local authority: Aberdeen City Council
- Head teacher: Jill Cruickshank
- Gender: Co-educational
- Age: 11 to 18
- Enrolment: 584 (2018) +700 (2021 estimated)
- Houses: Braemar, Crathes, Drum, and Fyvie
- Colours: / Black, Red/Navy & White
- School years: S1-S6
- Website: Bridge of Don Academy

Bridge of Don Academy is an Aberdeen City Council operated six-year secondary comprehensive school and community centre in Bridge of Don, Aberdeen, Scotland. The building was opened in 1979, originally designed to accommodate around 900 pupils. The school's functional capacity is currently 799. Its feeder primaries are Balmedie, Braehead and Scotstown primary schools.

The school campus is currently shared with Braehead Primary School and Saint Columbia's Church of Scotland and Roman Catholic church. Adjacent to the school is Westfield Park and playing fields.

== Houses ==
The school uses a house system and is split into four named after local castles. In 2012 pupils of the school were asked to come up with names that they thought were ideal to fit the new houses. These are:

- Crathes House
- Drum House
- Fyvie House

Prior to this the school had four houses named after Scottish islands:

- Arran House
- Iona House
- Skye House
- Tiree House

In 2021, a fourth house was added:

- Braemar House
