= Böda =

Village in Borgholm Municipality, Sweden

Coordinates: 57°15′34″N 17°02′06″E

Böda is a village (småort) in Böda socken, Borgholm Municipality, on the island of Öland, Sweden. Close to the Baltic Sea and giving access to sandy beaches, it is a popular tourist destination.

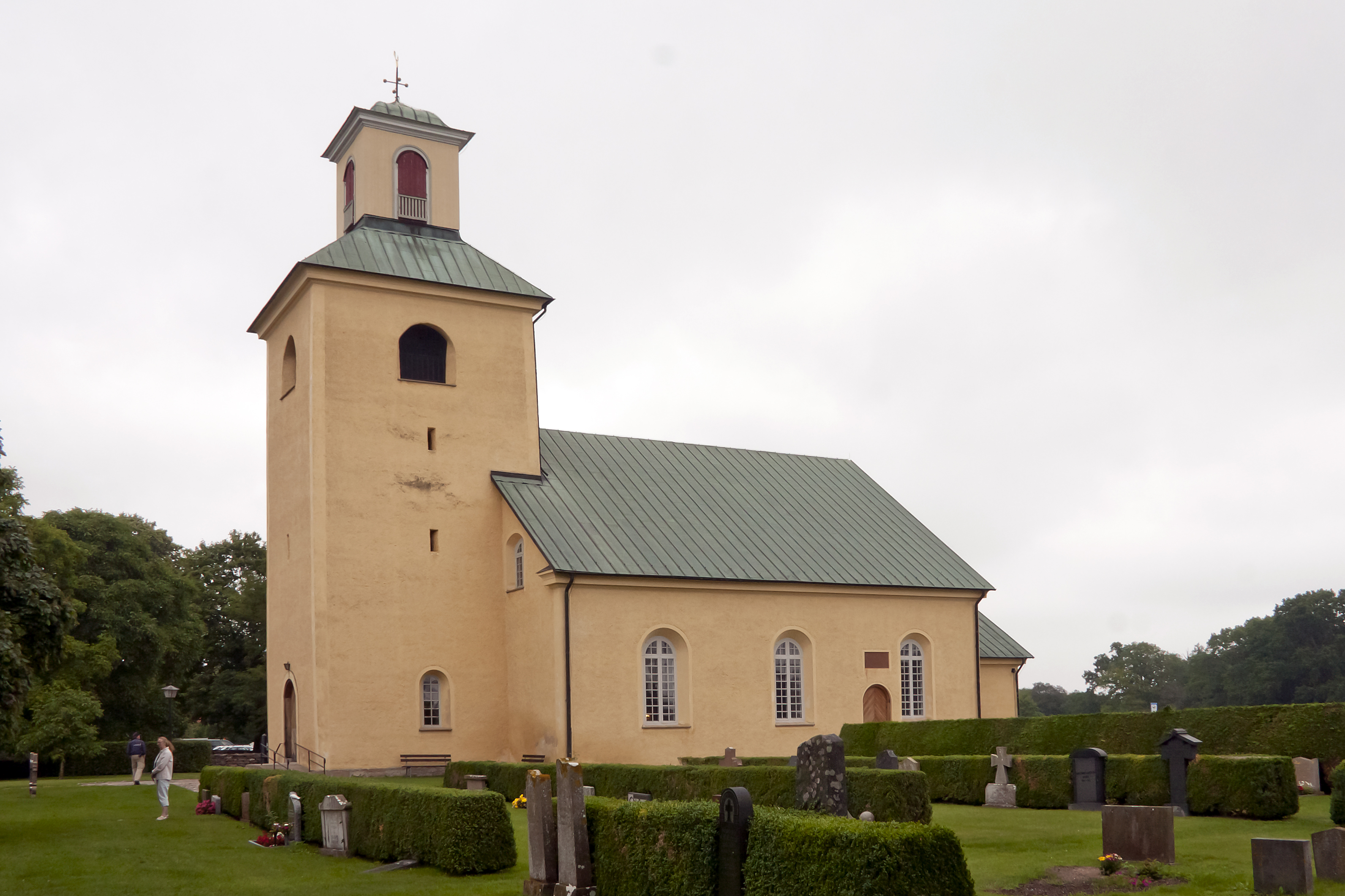
Böda church

Böda comprises several villages and small towns, including Kyrketorp with Böda church, Bödahamn (Böda harbor, at the southern end of Bödabukten, a bay), and Mellböda (which has a youth hostel). Bödahamn has a fishing port and marina as well as a sea rescue station. North and west of Böda is the state-owned Böda kronopark. Several camp sites are located near the white, sandy beach of Böda Sand on the Baltic Sea, "one of the island's best sandy beaches".

== Population ==
- 1960: 227
- 1960: 213
- 1990: 144
- 1995: 120
- 2000: 101
- 2005: 100
- 2010: 109
