= Jonas Jonsson (19th-century builder) =

Swedish architect

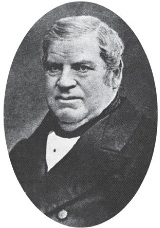

Jonas Jonsson (1806 – 7 November 1885) was a Swedish master builder and architect who designed built many churches, town buildings in Stockholm, and lighthouses along the Swedish coast.

== Biography ==
Jonsson was born outside Eksjö in Jönköping County, Sweden. Little is known of his early years or education. Lars Strömbäck assumes in his short biography that as a boy he was apprenticed to a local builder. Records from 1826 mention Jonsson as foreman ("verkmästare) at the building of the empire style church at Lofta on Öland which was designed by the prominent architect Axel Nyström (1793–1868). Johnson was to collaborate for many years with Nyström, and had by 1836 progressed to being in full charge of the building of Nyström's church in Utna. In the late 1830s he was commissioned to construct Brunkebergs hotell in central Stockholm. The hotel which was erected between 1837 and 1841 was designed by Nyström and remained in operation until 1969.

Jonsson was prodigiously productive throughout his career. This took place at a time when the Empire style was popular throughout Europe; particular so in Sweden where it had been introduced by King Karl Johan of Sweden (former Marshal of France General Bernadotte), where it was named the "Karl Johan Empire style". The style remained popular in Scandinavia throughout the nineteenth century. This fashion was sustained by France paying some of its debts to Sweden in ormolu bronzes rather than in currency.

The buildings Jonas Jonsson supervised were often designed by prominent architects including Nyström as well as Jöran Folke Oppman and his son Folke Birger Oppman (1818-1876). These were financed by parishes, or rural nobility and gentry as well as the Swedish state. His influence on building practices at Tjust in Småland was such that the characteristic Tjust empire style (Tjustempiren) was sometimes referred to as the "Jonsson empire style". He also gradually acquired some architectural skills, and was himself behind the design of a number of buildings including Linköping Savings Bank (Linköpings Sparbank) and Ljungstedtska school (Ljungstedtska skolan).

The rapid growth of shipping in the mid-19th century led to a need for more lighthouses along the Swedish coasts, and Jonsson was responsible for many new or refurbished lighthouses during the 1840s: Vinga, Kullen, Långe Erik, Fårö and Landsort. He was so successful as a lighthouse-builder that he was eventually offered such jobs without the standard tender procedure for government-financed buildings. However, there are also records of complaints from both workers and government inspectors, giving a picture of an unyielding man.

== Personal life ==
Jonsson married Fanny Sundström in 1842 and they had four children. In 1852, he moved with his family to Linköping, which became the center of his construction activities over the next 20 years. Strömbäck describes Jonsson as an example of social mobility: from humble rural beginnings, he became a wealthy citizen of the thriving city of Linköping, owner of several houses and member of the city council.

== Gallery ==
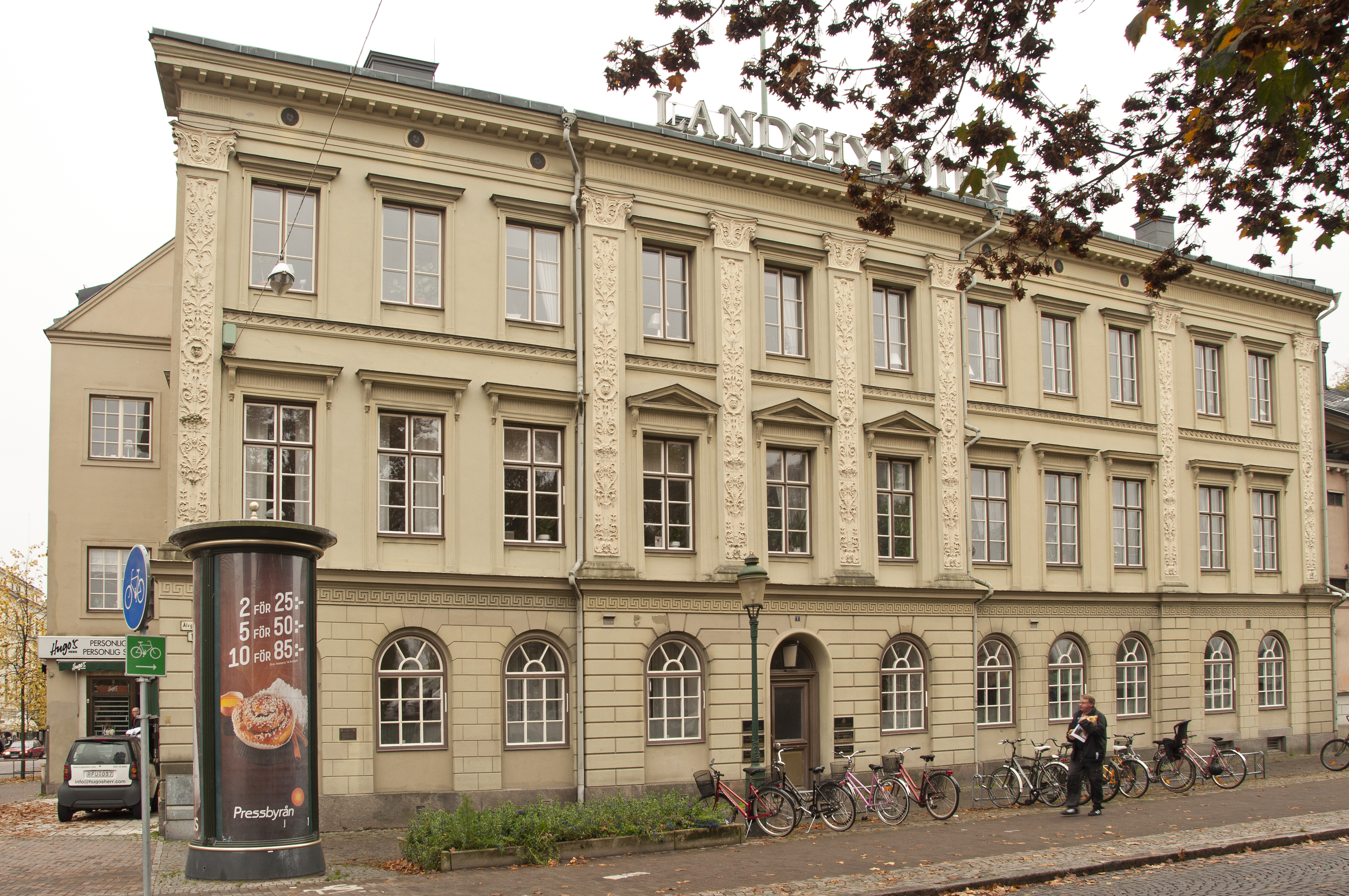
Hypoteksföreningens hus, Karlstad (1850)

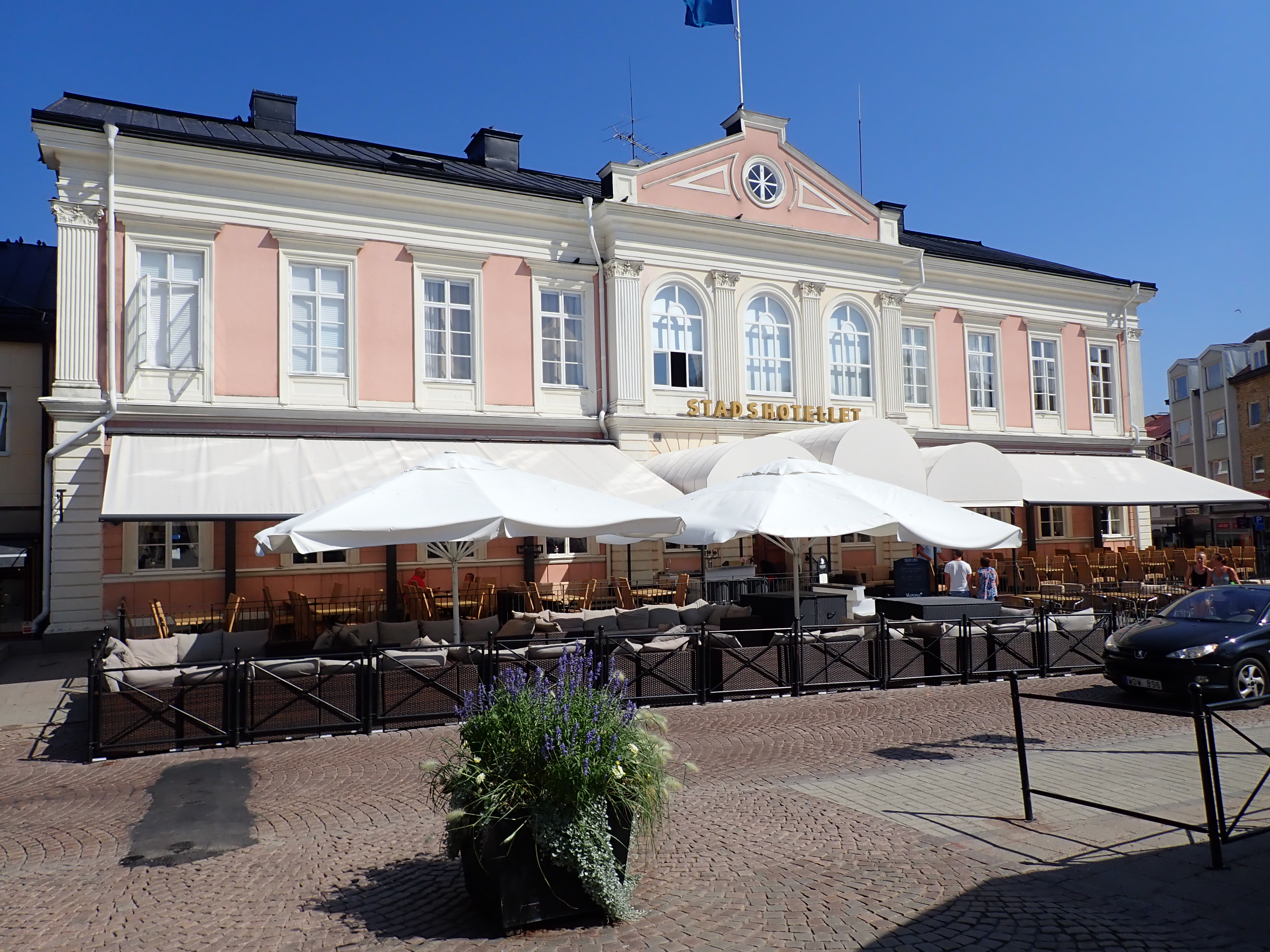
Stadshotellet, Vimmerby (1860)

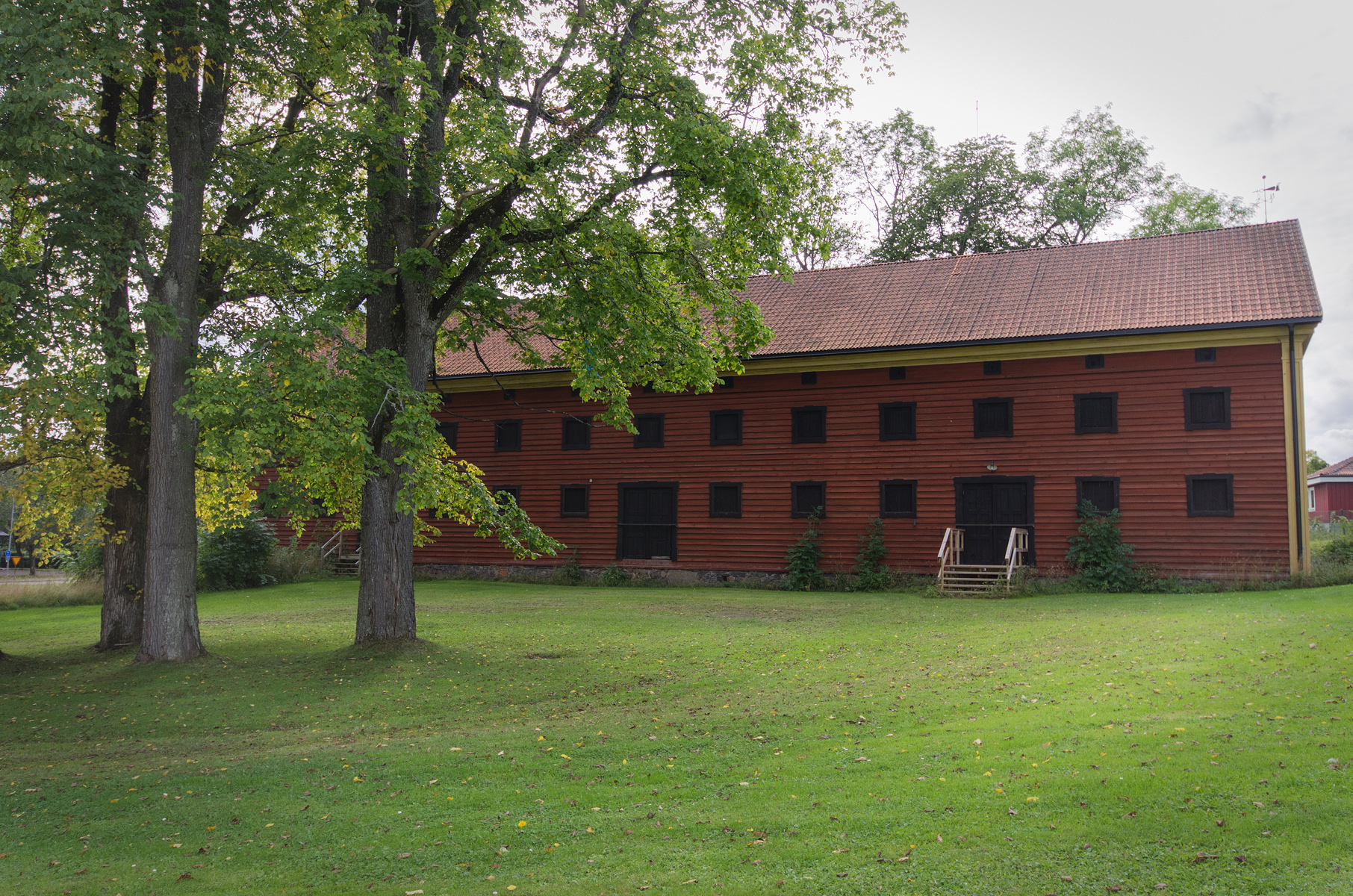
Ålundamagasinet, Åtvidaberg (1866)
