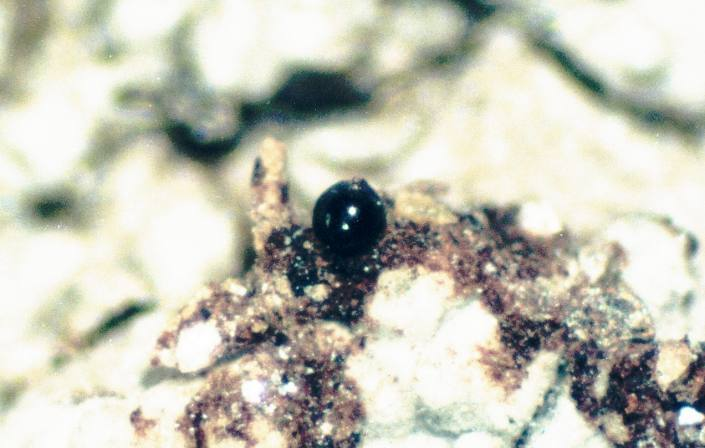
- Sphinctrina turbinata

Scientific classification
- Domain: Eukaryota
- Kingdom: Fungi
- Division: Ascomycota
- Class: Eurotiomycetes
- Order: Mycocaliciales
- Family: Sphinctrinaceae
- Genus: Sphinctrina; Fr. (1825)

Type species
- Sphinctrina turbinata Fr. (1825)

Synonyms
- Phacotiella Vain. (1927)

= Sphinctrina =

Genus of fungi

Sphinctrina is a genus of lichenicolous fungi, usually not lichenized, in the family Sphinctrinaceae. Its species are most commonly parasitic on lichens of the genus Pertusaria.

== Species ==
- Sphinctrina anglica Nyl. (1860)
- Sphinctrina benmargana Selva (2004)
- Sphinctrina intermedia Tibell (2014)
- Sphinctrina leucopoda Nyl. (1859)
- Sphinctrina ophioparmae Kalb (2001)
- Sphinctrina pallidella (Willey) Selva (2004)
- Sphinctrina paramerae D.Muñiz & Hladún (2013)
- Sphinctrina tubaeformis A.Massal. (1853)
- Sphinctrina turbinata Fr. (1825)
