= Bohdan =

Bohdan may refer to:

- Bohdan (name), a Slavic masculine name
- Bohdan, Podlaskie Voivodeship, a village in Poland
- Bohdan, Zakarpattia Oblast, a village in Ukraine
- Bohdan (bus), a bus manufactured in Ukraine
