= Boda, Rajgarh =

Boda
- Town
- Location in Madhya Pradesh, India Boda (India)
- Coordinates: 23°39′32″N 76°48′42″E
- India: India
- State: Madhya Pradesh
- District: Rajgarh

Government
  - Type: Urban Local Administration
  - Body: Nagar Parishad Boda
  - President: Dwarika Prasad Soni

Population (2014)
  - Total: 11,900 (Approx.)

Languages
  - Official: Hindi
- Time zone: UTC+5:30 (IST)
- PIN: 465685
- Telephone code: 07375
- ISO 3166 code: IN-MP
- Vehicle registration: MP-39

Boda is a town and a Nagar Parishad in Rajgarh district in the state of Madhya Pradesh, India.

== Demographics ==
As of the 2011 Indian census, the village had a population of 9,886. Males constitute 52% of the population and females 48%. Boda has an average literacy rate of 56%, lower than the national average of 59.5%; with male literacy of 71% and female literacy of 40%, whereas 16% of the population is under 6 years of age.

The main language spoken in Boda is Hindi, along with Malvi (a regional language and local dialect of Hindi).

== Culture ==
Festivals like Basant Panchami are celebrated by Gupta Pariwars (Medatwal Samaj). On Independence Day and Republic Day, several cultural programs are organized by schools. One of its main attractions is Andheria Bagh which is a historic temple of the Goddess Durga. Hanuman Mandir is more famous that is called 'Bageechi'. Sweet shops are also quite popular in the town. It boasts lush agricultural landscape and people own large amount of lands where they cultivate their crops. There are some more temples, such as Bada Mandir, Sitaram Mandir and Shreenath Mandir. Yaha onion farm has a big area of produce in this town mostly Patidar cast. A maa Chamunda Mandir has been built.

== Transport ==
The nearest airport is Bhopal. Nearest Railway stations are Pachore and Shujalpur
