= Grankullaviken =

Bay at the northern tip of Öland, Sweden

Coordinates: 57°21′N 17°6′E

Grankullaviken and surroundings.

Grankullaviken (or Grankullavik) is a shallow bay at the northern tip of Öland, Sweden, located in Böda socken, Borgholm Municipality. The bay is almost completely enclosed by two headlands and a few small shoal islands (Stora grundet, Borren, and Lilla grundet). Grankullavik is also the name of a village on the bay. The lighthouse Långe Erik on the Stora grundet island is officially named Ölands norra udde (Öland's northernmost point), even though the western headland extends a bit further north than the island upon which it stands. The eastern headland is the site of the windswept forest and nature reserve Trollskogen.

== History ==
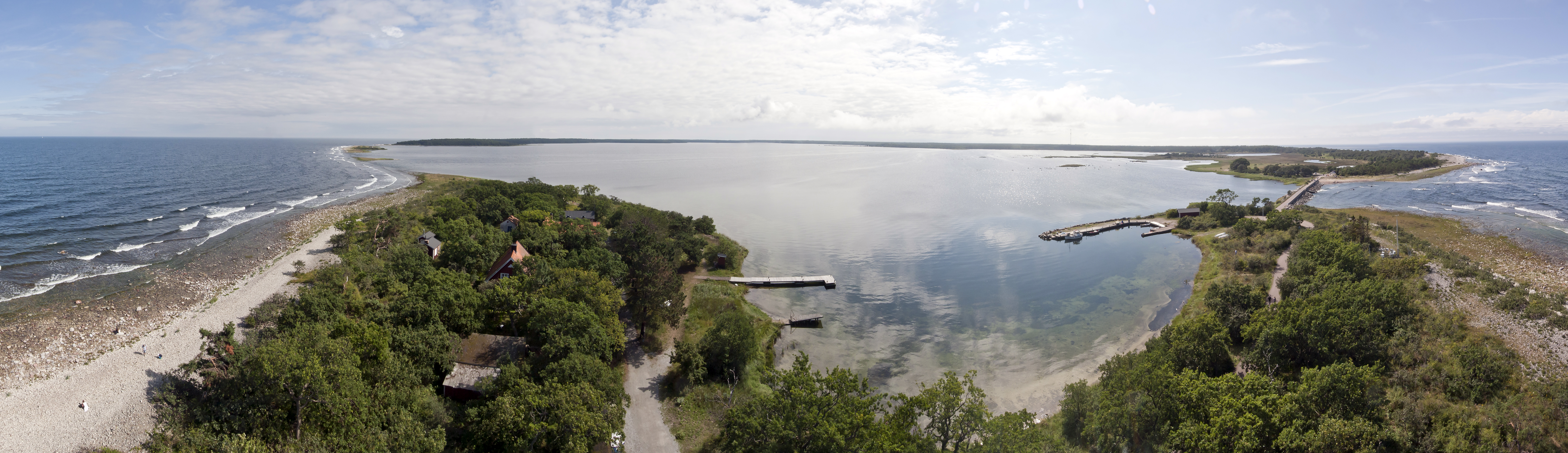
Panoramic image of Grankullaviken from the lighthouse Långe Erik.

In medieval times the bay was also referred to as Örehamn, and was probably important already in prehistoric times. This part of Öland was an important landing point for merchants in northern Kalmar County, and much of the shipping toward Gotland passed through this area as well. The bay and its port were of paramount importance to the economy of Boda. In modern times; Grankullaviken was important for the shipping of timber.

The three small shoal islands (Stora grundet, Borren, and Lilla grundet) have a history of human habitation as well. Stora grundet is the location of the lighthouse, and Lilla grundet is the site of a chapel dedicated to St. Olav and an abandoned cemetery. Records from the Linköping diocese dating from 1515 mention a chapel Sancti Olaui in Böda, but there are no further details; it is likely that stones from the chapel were used in the construction of the lighthouse.

=== Harbor ===
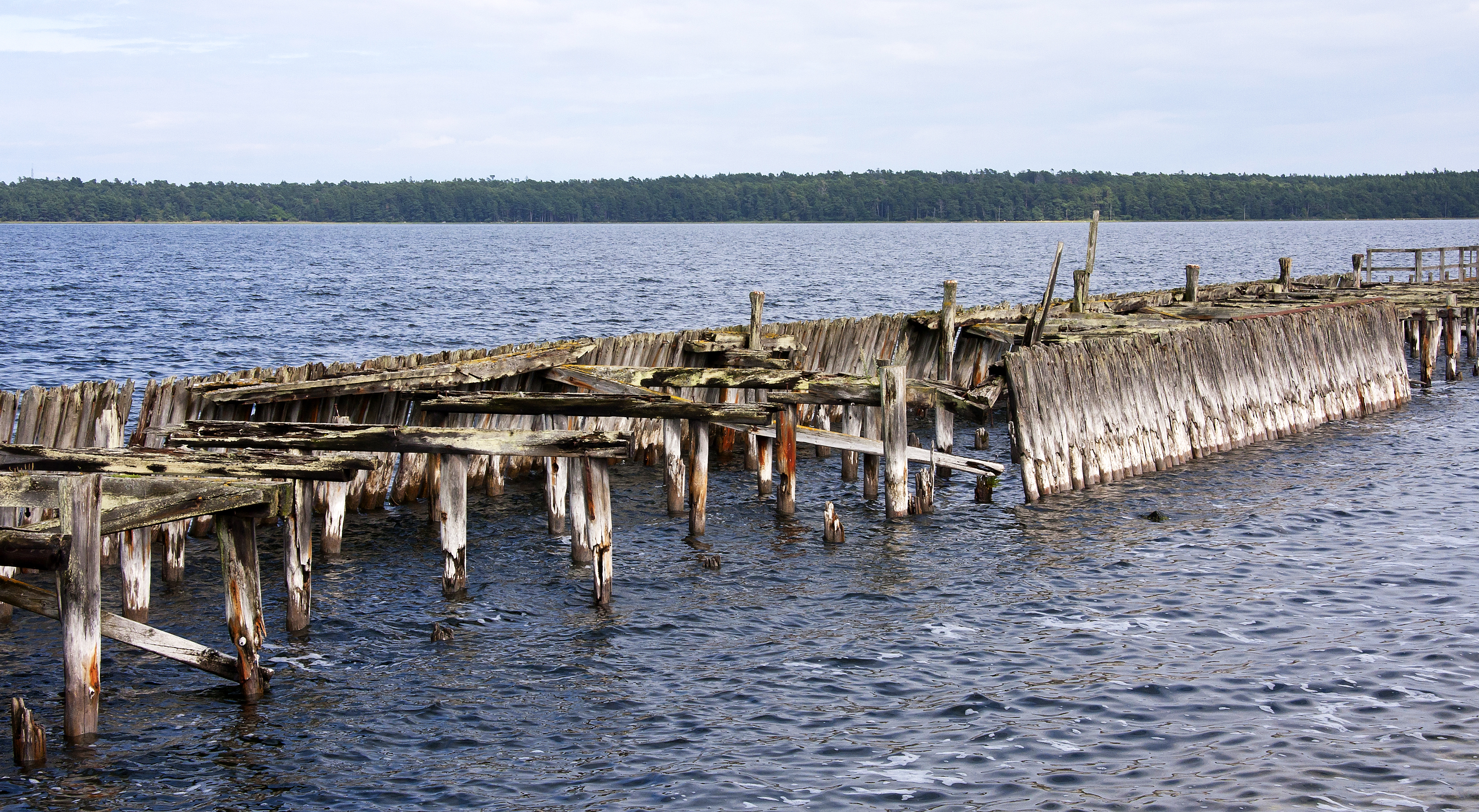
Old wooden jetty of Nabbelund, for lumber transport and ferry service to Gotland.

Lumber was shipped from Nabbelund (a village just below Långe Erik) into the 1950s, when the mill closed down. In 2007 the harbor was prepared for ferry service to Gotland; remains of the old pier were inventoried and preparations made for new infrastructure. Ferry service since 1959 was provided intermittently by the converted cargo ship Nordpol, sailing between Nabbelund and Gotland (Klintehamn or Visby).

The marina and fishing port of Grankullaviken at Nabbelund became defunct in March 2008. After a collision in Nynashamn between two ferries operated by Destination Gotland in July 2009, the ferry service established in 2007 ended on July 23, 2009.

== Fishing ==
Grankullaviken's sheltered location is attractive to fishermen who fish mainly for pike, bass, and trout, besides garfish, flatfish, sik, and ide.
