= Bedroom Eyes (musician) =

Swedish indie pop singer and songwriter

- Birth name: Jonas Melker Alexander Jonsson
- Born: April 6, 1983 (age 42); Föllinge, Sweden
- Genres: Indie pop
- Occupation(s): Singer, songwriter
- Instrument: Vocals
- Years active: 2006–present
- Website: www.bedroomeyes.se

Bedroom Eyes is a Swedish indie pop singer and songwriter (born Jonas Melker Alexander Jonsson; April 6, 1983, in Föllinge, Sweden).

His debut album was recorded in 2009 at Ocean Sound Recordings in Giske Municipality, Norway, with engineer Herman Söderström.

Jonsson lists Sofia Coppola, Bruce Springsteen and Dave Eggers as artistic influences.

== Biography ==
Bedroom Eyes has released two self-released EPs for free download, "Embrace in Stereo EP" in 2006 and "Valentine Vacancy EP" in 2007, and stirred up an internet interest resulting in more than 140,000 downloads of the song "Motorcycle Daydream". According to Elbo.ws he reached the top five among the world's most popular blog artists with the release of "Valentine Vacancy EP". Meanwhile, music news site Idolator.com referred to him as "this week's biggest artist in the world".

Rolling Stone magazine said about Jonsson: "Specialized in gracious songs about heartaches and personal dramas. [...] A strong songwriting. Like Jens Lekman meets Belle & Sebastian."

In 2007, Bedroom Eyes performed at Quart Festival in Kristiansand, Norway.

== EPs ==
- 2006" "Embrace in Stereo EP"
- 2007: "Valentine Vacancy EP"
