= Långe Erik =

Långe Erik Lighthouse Ölands Norra Udde Öland North End
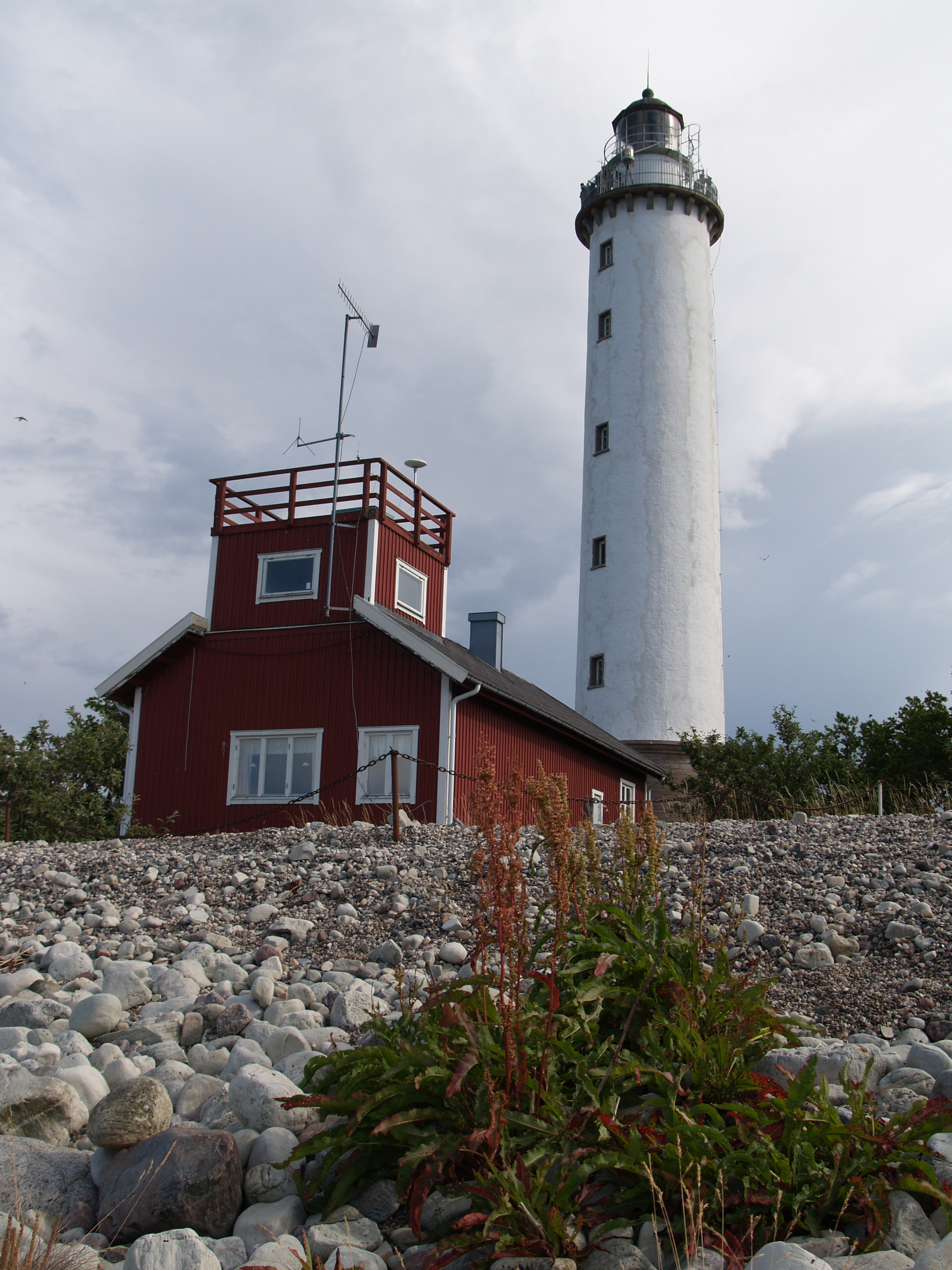
- Långe Erik Lighthouse
- Location: Grankullavik; Öland; Sweden
- Coordinates: 57.367036°N 17.097001°E

Tower
- Constructed: 1845
- Foundation: limestone
- Construction: limestone tower
- Automated: 1976
- Height: 32.1 metres (105 ft)
- Shape: cylindrical tower with balcony and lantern
- Markings: white tower, grey metallic lantern dome
- Power source: rapeseed oil, kerosene, electricity
- Operator: Swedish Maritime Administration (Sjöfartsverket)
- Heritage: governmental listed building, governmental listed building complex

Light
- First lit: 1 November 1845
- Focal height: 31.5 metres (103 ft)
- Lens: 3rd order Fresnel lens (original), small aerobeacon (current)
- Range: 13.8 nautical miles (25.6 km; 15.9 mi)
- Characteristic: Fl (4) W 15s.
- Sweden no.: SV-5475

Långe Erik ("Tall Erik"), official name Ölands norra udde, is a Swedish lighthouse built in 1845 and located on a little island, Stora Grundet (in Böda socken, Borgholm Municipality), in Grankullaviken bay at the north point of Öland, the second largest island in Sweden. The island is connected to Öland by a small bridge built in 1965.

The lighthouse is whitewashed, 32 meters high. It was designed by H. Byström and built by Jonas Jonsson. The former lighthouse keeper's house is next to the lighthouse, with a few buildings from the 1900s.

The older, larger lens is still installed, but no longer in use. The lens was used until the 1990s before an aerobeacon was installed on the lantern's balcony. The light is remote-controlled by the Swedish Maritime Administration.

The tower is open to visitors during the summer. Tickets are bought in a building next to the tower.

== See also ==
- List of lighthouses and lightvessels in Sweden
- Långe Jan ("Tall John"), the lighthouse at the south cape of Öland.
