= Grankullavik =

- Village
- Location within Sweden
- Coordinates: 57°20′10″N 17°5′40″E
- Country: Sweden
- Location: Öland
- Län: Kalmar County
- Municipality: Borgholm Municipality

Grankullavik is a village on the Grankullaviken bay in the north of Öland, Sweden, in the Böda socken, Borgholm Municipality.
