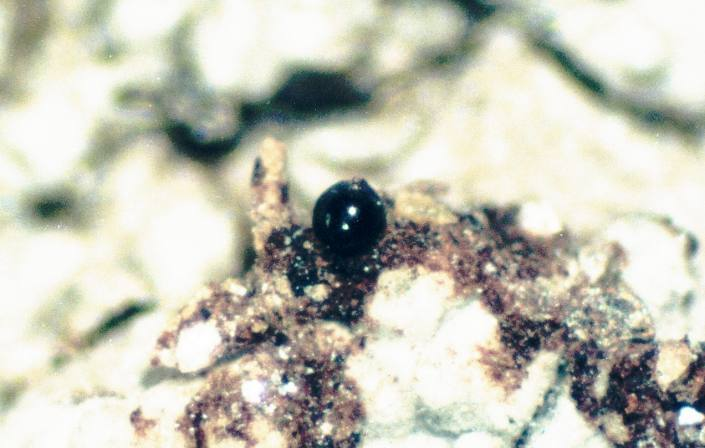
- Sphinctrina turbinata, member of the Sphinctrinaceae.

Scientific classification
- Kingdom: Fungi
- Division: Ascomycota
- Class: Eurotiomycetes
- Order: Mycocaliciales
- Family: Sphinctrinaceae; M.Choisy (1950)

Genera
- Pyrgidium; Sphinctrina

= Sphinctrinaceae =

Family of fungi

The Sphinctrinaceae are a family of fungi in the order Mycocaliciales.
