= Böda socken =

Coordinates: 57.2445°N 17.0597°E

Böda socken

Böda socken is a former socken of Åkerbo Hundred on Öland, Sweden. Since 1974, it has been part of the Borgholm Municipality on the island of Öland, Sweden. It covers 107 square kilometers and had 773 inhabitants in 2000.

== History ==
The oldest parts of Böda Church date from the late 12th century, although the church was heavily reconstructed in 1801–03. Böda parish is mentioned in a transcript from about 1320 ("de Bødhum"), and in the Böda missal from the first half of the 14th century ("ecclesie Bødhe"); there is an attestation from 1346 ("in parochiis ... bodha"). The medieval boundaries of the socken were about the same as those from the 1950s, with the exception of the village Binnerbäck, which was transferred around 1649 from Böda to Högby socken. The village Bocketorp was shared by the two socken.

After the municipal reform in 1862, the responsibility for the ecclesiastical and civil organization of the socken was transferred to the Böda landskommun. The latter was incorporated into Öland's Åkerbo district in 1952, and this in turn was incorporated into Borgholm Municipality in 1974. In 2010 the parish became part of Northern Öland's Assembly.

Much of the socken's area is taken up by the Böda kronopark.

== Archeology ==
The socken has various burial mounds from the Bronze Age and graves from the Iron Age.

== Sites of interest in Böda socken ==
- Långe Erik, a lighthouse built in 1845
- the wreck of the Swiks, which stranded in 1926
- Grankullaviken, a bay occupying the northern tip of the island
- Trollskogen, a windswept pine forest and nature reserve

== See also ==
- Mörbylånga
