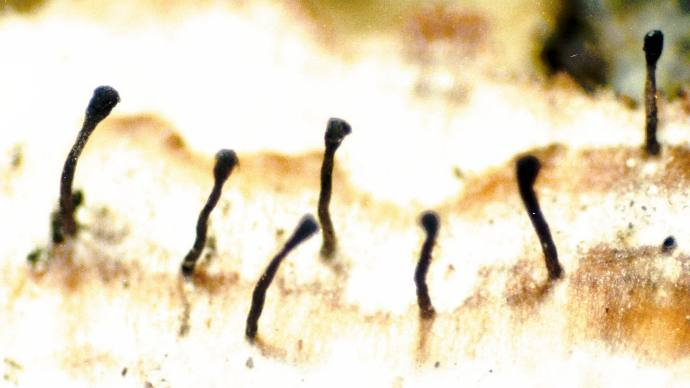
- Phaeocalicium polyporaeum, member of the family Mycocaliciaceae

Scientific classification
- Kingdom: Fungi
- Division: Ascomycota
- Class: Eurotiomycetes
- Order: Mycocaliciales
- Family: Mycocaliciaceae; A.F.W.Schmidt (1970)

Type genus
- Mycocalicium Vain. (1890)

Genera
- Brunneocarpos; Chaenothecopsis; Mycocalicium; Phaeocalicium; Pyrgidium; Sphinctrina; Stenocybe

Synonyms
- Sphinctrinaceae M.Choisy (1950)

= Mycocaliciaceae =

Family of fungi

The Mycocaliciaceae are a family of fungi in the order Mycocaliciales, comprising seven genera and approximately 90 species. Originally proposed in 1970 by Alexander Schmidt, the family is characterised by immersed thalli, stalked brown or black ascomata (fruiting bodies), and small cylindrical asci that release ascospores without forming a mazaedium. Molecular phylogenetic studies have placed Mycocaliciaceae within the class Eurotiomycetes and led to the inclusion of taxa formerly classified in the Sphinctrinaceae. The family has a fossil record dating back at least 50 million years, with several specimens discovered in Baltic and Bitterfeld amber. Mycocaliciaceae genera include Chaenothecopsis, Mycocalicium, and Phaeocalicium, which exhibit a range of ecological roles from saprobic to parasitic relationships with their substrates.

== Taxonomy ==
Calicioid fungi are a heterogeneous assemblage of fungi sharing the presence of a mazaedium, a structure in which loose masses of ascospores accumulate and which then are passively disseminated. Before 1970, the presence of a mazaedium was considered to be the defining trait of the order Caliciales, historically considered to be a monophyletic group. Mycocaliciaceae was circumscribed in 1970 by the lichenologist Alexander Schmidt. He showed that some of the genera that had been traditionally classified in the Caliciales had active spore dispersal rather than a mazaedium. He resurrected Chaenothecopsis, Mycocalicium and Strongyleuma, accepted Stenocybe and described the new genus Phaeocalicium. The Mycocaliciaceae and the Sphinctrinaceae are the families in the order Mycocaliciales, which was created in 2000 by Leif Tibell and Mats Weden. Mycocaliciaceae was shown in several studies to belong to the class Eurotiomycetes.

In 2005, molecular phylogenetic analysis of internal transcribed spacer DNA sequences suggested that the Sphinctrinaceae nested in the Mycocaliciaceae, and further, that some of the morphological features traditionally used to classify Mycocaliciales genera were found to be homoplasious. The 2022 "Outline of Fungi", a multi-authored compilation of fungal classification, places the Sphinctrinaceae in synonymy with the Mycocaliciaceae.

== Description ==
The thallus of Mycocaliciaceae species are immersed in the substrate, and often absent. Ascomata are stalked, brown or black, and topped by a head that is disc-like to somewhat spherical. Interascal tissue is absent in the hymenium. The asci are small, cylindrical, thick-walled at least in the apex, and not evanescent at an early stage. Ascospores are ellipsoidal to cylindrical in shape, pale to mid brown in colour, with walls that are smooth and thin. The ascospores are not released in a mazaedial mass.

== Genera ==
The list of the genera in the Mycocaliciaceae includes taxa formerly classified in the Sphinctrinaceae. Following the genus name is the taxonomic authority, year of publication, and the number of species:

- Brunneocarpos Giraldo & Crous (2016) – 1 sp.
- Chaenothecopsis Vain. (1927) – ca. 40 spp.
- Mycocalicium Vain. (1890) – 12 spp.
- Phaeocalicium A.F.W.Schmidt (1970) – 11 spp.
- Pyrgidium Nyl. (1867) – 3 spp.
- Sphinctrina Fr. (1825) – ca. 9 spp.
- Stenocybe Nyl. ex. Körb. (1855) – 14 spp.

== Fossil record ==
The first fossil record of a member of the Mycocaliciaceae was reported in 2000. The species, Chaenothecopsis bitterfeldensis, was described and illustrated from Bitterfeld amber dating back to at least 20 million years ago. The similarity in morphology to some extant East Asian species suggests that the genus had an ancient Laurasian distribution. Since then, several new calicioid fossil specimens have been discovered from Baltic amber (50–35 million years ago). For example, in 2020, nine new fossils were reported. Of all reported calicioid fossils, six are assigned to Chaenothecopsis and one to Phaeocalicium.
