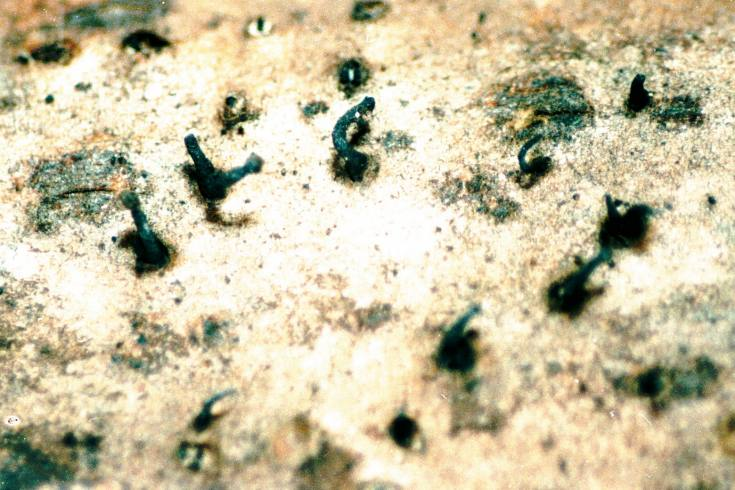
- Herbarium specimen of Phaeocalicium curtisii, member of the Mycocaliciales order.

Scientific classification
- Domain: Eukaryota
- Kingdom: Fungi
- Division: Ascomycota
- Class: Eurotiomycetes
- Subclass: Mycocaliciomycetidae; Tibell
- Order: Mycocaliciales; Tibell & Wedin (2000)

Families
- Mycocaliciaceae; Sphinctrinaceae

= Mycocaliciales =

Order of fungi

The Mycocaliciales are an order of ascomycetous fungi within the subclass Mycocaliciomycetidae and within the class Eurotiomycetes (subphylum Pezizomycotina).
