= Chaenotricha =

Scientific classification
- Kingdom: Fungi
- Division: Ascomycota
- Class: Coniocybomycetes
- Order: Coniocybales
- Family: Coniocybaceae
- Genus: Chaenotricha; Suija, McMullin & P.Lõhmus (2023)

Type species
- Chaenotricha obscura (G.Merr.) Suija, McMullin & P.Lõhmus (2023)

Species
- C. cilians C. obscura

Genus of lichen-forming fungi

Chaenotricha is a small genus of lichen-forming fungi in the family Coniocybaceae. Species live fungicolously, growing on the fruiting bodies of the poroid bracket fungus Trichaptum, and produce tiny, pin-like, dust-sporing fruiting bodies typical of calicioid lichens. The genus was established in 2023 to accommodate a distinct lineage of Trichaptum specialists. These lichens occur on standing dead conifer trunks and snags in boreal and hemiboreal forests of northern Europe and North America. The two described species are distinguished primarily by stalk length and ascospore size, though DNA sequencing is often needed for reliable identification.

== Taxonomy ==
Fungicolous, calicioid lichens growing on Trichaptum have been noted since the nineteenth century, including a Scandinavian record by Theodor Fries (1865) of a Chaenotheca brunneola variant cilians on that host, although the original material is lost. In North America, George Merrill (1909) described Calicium obscurum from Trichaptum; the name was later used in Chaenotheca, and a superficially similar North American taxon, Chaenotheca balsamconensis (2015), was subsequently shown to be the same species as Merrill's and treated as a synonym.

A molecular re-assessment of chaenothecoid fungi occurring on Trichaptum demonstrated that these specimens form a separate lineage within Coniocybomycetes, sister to the combined clade of Chaenotheca in the loose sense and Sclerophora. On that evidence, the new genus Chaenotricha was erected in 2023 for the Trichaptum-specialists. The new combination Chaenotricha obscura was made for Merrill's taxon, with an epitype from Michigan designated to fix the application of the name; a new European species, C. cilians, was introduced, and a third, well-supported lineage was left undescribed for now because material was limited. The genus name combines Chaenotheca (where these fungi had been placed historically) and Trichaptum, their host.

== Description ==
The thallus is immersed or inconspicuous on the host surface, sometimes forming a thin, cortex-free granular layer loosely associated with unicellular green algae; in some cases on the pore surface of the host fruiting body no algal partner is evident, suggesting that lichenisation can be weak or optional in certain microhabitats.

Ascomata are minute, stalked pins with a darker head that carries a powdery spore mass (a mazaedium). Stalks are dark brown to black, usually shiny and without a frosty coating (epruinose); a standard potassium hydroxide spot test may draw out a red pigment from the stalk (K+ red), though this reaction varies within and among specimens. Internally, the excipulum and hypothecium are well developed and continuous with the stalk; the spore-bearing tissue breaks down early so that mature spores accumulate as a dust. Asci are cylindrical, eight-spored and arranged in a single row; paraphyses are simple and hyaline. Ascospores are non-septate, smooth, hyaline when young and brown at maturity, spherical to irregularly spherical. No asexual morph is known.

Across the genus, external features overlap, so measurements and DNA data are often needed for reliable identification. C. cilians generally has shorter stalks (about 0.3–0.9 mm, mean about 0.6 mm) and smaller spores (mostly around 4.4–4.5 μm) than C. obscura (stalks about 0.6–1.9 mm, mean about 1.1 mm; spores 5.2–5.6 μm), although individual specimens may vary. In practice, spore diameter and stalk length are the most informative measured characters, and sequencing of the internal transcribed spacer region is commonly used to separate the species.

== Habitat and distribution ==
Chaenotricha species grow exclusively on the fruiting bodies (sporocarps) of Trichaptum, recorded on T. abietinum, T. fuscoviolaceum and T. biforme. They are typically found on standing dead trunks or snags in hemiboreal and boreal settings, most often on conifers such as Norway spruce and Scots pine, and occasionally on birch.

The genus is known from northern and eastern Europe—including Denmark, Estonia, Latvia, Lithuania, Norway, Russia and Sweden—and from North America (Canada and the United States). The undescribed lineage is documented from a small number of sites in Canada, the USA and Estonia.
