= Chaenotricha cilians =

Scientific classification
- Kingdom: Fungi
- Division: Ascomycota
- Class: Coniocybomycetes
- Order: Coniocybales
- Family: Coniocybaceae
- Genus: Chaenotricha
- Species: C. cilians

Binomial name
- Chaenotricha cilians Suija, McMullin & P.Lõhmus (2023)
- Type locality: Kardla village, Estonia

Species of lichen-forming fungus

Chaenotricha cilians is a species of pin lichen in the family Coniocybaceae. It was described as new to science in 2023 from Estonia, and is one of two species in the newly established genus Chaenotricha. Unlike most lichens, it grows on the fruiting bodies of bracket fungi in the genus Trichaptum rather than on bark or rock, producing tiny dark pin-like structures along the edges of its host. The species is known from boreal and hemiboreal forests across northern Europe, with a single record from Canada.

== Taxonomy ==
Chaenotricha cilians was described as a new species in 2023 by Ave Suija, R. Troy McMullin, and Pärtel Lõhmus, based on material collected from the sporocarps (the bracket-like fruiting bodies) of the polypore wood-decay fungus Trichaptum. In the same study, the authors introduced the genus Chaenotricha for a lineage of stalked, mazaediate (powdery-spored) pin lichens specialized on Trichaptum, after multi-locus DNA data showed that these fungicolous specimens form a distinct lineage within Coniocybomycetes, separate from Chaenotheca and Sclerophora.

The epithet cilians revives a name introduced by Theodor Magnus Fries in 1865 for a fungus-dwelling form of Chaenotheca brunneola occurring on old, dead fruiting bodies of Polyporus abietinus (now treated in Trichaptum) around Uppsala. Fries remarked that it could be found on many such polypores in the district, but only as a narrow fringe at the outermost edge of the cap; the tiny black apothecia reminded him of håren i ögonlockets kant ('eyelashes'), hence his designation "β cilians". The original material for Fries's form is thought to be lost, and the epithet was later revived for the modern species concept when the Trichaptum-associated lineage was recognised as distinct. Within Chaenotricha, phylogenetic analyses resolved three lineages, two of which were treated as species; C. cilians corresponds mainly to a northern European lineage (with one North American record). It can be separated from the related Chaenotricha obscura by its shorter apothecial stalks on average and slightly smaller ascospores. The type specimen was collected in Estonia from Trichaptum growing on a Norway spruce snag in a spruce-dominated forest.

== Description ==
The thallus of Chaenotricha cilians is usually inconspicuous and may be hard to see on the surface of its host fungus. Where it is present, the fungal partner forms a loose association with microscopic green algal cells on the sporocarp surface, so the lichenized component is largely expressed as the fruiting bodies. These are minute, stalked apothecia that appear as fine dark "pins", developing mostly on the upper surface and along the edges of Trichaptum sporocarps, and only occasionally on the underside spore-bearing surface.

Each apothecium has a slender, dark-brown stalk (generally under 1 mm long) topped by a small, rounded to slightly cone-shaped head (capitulum). The spore mass (mazaedium) is dark brown and powdery, and the exciple is well developed as a continuation of the stalk tissue. The asci are cylindrical and typically contain eight spores arranged in a single row. The ascospores are smooth, non-septate (single celled) and become brown at maturity, usually about 4–5 μm in diameter and roughly spherical to irregularly spherical. No asexual reproductive structures have been reported.

== Habitat and distribution ==
Chaenotricha cilians is fungicolous, growing directly on the sporocarps of Trichaptum species, including T. abietinum, T. fuscoviolaceum and T. biforme. It has been recorded mainly from hemiboreal and boreal forests and boggy habitats, where its Trichaptum hosts occur on standing dead trunks and snags, most often of Norway spruce and Scots pine and only rarely birch.

The species is currently known from northern and eastern Europe (Denmark, Estonia, Latvia, Lithuania, Norway, Russia and Sweden) and has also been reported once from Canada. In a few collections the apothecia were produced on the hymenophore (the underside spore-bearing surface) of the host. In those cases the authors did not detect algal cells around the apothecia, raising the possibility that lichenization in this species may be facultative (occurring only under certain conditions) rather than constant.
