= List of lichens of Sweden =

This is a highly incomplete list of lichens of Sweden ordered by their scientific name. Swedish and scientific names are written in italics.

- Arthopyrenia gemmata, Grå vårtlav
- Calicium abietinum, Svart knappnålslav
- Calicium viride, Grön knappnålslav
- Chaenotheca chlorella, Brun knappnålslav
- Coniocybe furfuracea, Ärgnållav
- Cyphelium tigillare, Ladlav
- Dermatocarpon aquaticum, Bäcklav
- Dermatocarpon miniatum, Sipperlav
- Erioderma pedicellatum
- Haematomma ventosum, Vindlav
- Porina chlorotica, Skugg-vårtlav
- Pyrenula nitida, Bok-vårtlav
- Rhizocarpon geographicum, Map lichen, Kartlav
- Sphaerophorus globosus, Korall-lav
- Staurothele fissa, Brun vårtlav
- Verrucaria maura, Saltlav
- Verrucaria rupestris, Kalk-vårtlav

== Sources ==
- Björn Ursing 1964. Svenska Växter: Kryptogamer.
