= Chaenotheca cinerea =

Conservation status
- Apparently Secure (NatureServe)

Scientific classification
- Domain: Eukaryota
- Kingdom: Fungi
- Division: Ascomycota
- Class: Coniocybomycetes
- Order: Coniocybales
- Family: Coniocybaceae
- Genus: Chaenotheca
- Species: C. cinerea

Binomial name
- Chaenotheca cinerea (Pers.) Tibell (1987)

Synonyms
- Calicium cinereum Pers. (1800)

Species of pin lichen

Chaenotheca cinerea is a species of pin lichen in the family Coniocybaceae. This small lichen forms grey-white crusts on tree bark and produces distinctive microscopic fruiting bodies that resemble tiny pins, each standing only 0.6–1 mm tall with thread-thin stalks topped by dark spore-bearing heads. Originally described in 1800 from specimens found in oak bark crevices, it is characterised by its two-toned stalks that are pale at the base and dark at the top, covered with a thick white powdery coating.

== Taxonomy ==
The lichen was first described in 1800 by Christiaan Hendrik Persoon as Calicium cinereum. Persoon distinguished the species by its gregarious growth habit, powdery ashen-grey stalks, and loose powdery blackish-olive disc. He noted that the species occurs commonly in bark crevices of oak trees (Provenit passim in fissuris corticis quercuum), classified it among the smaller Calicium species. Leif Tibell transferred it to the genus Chaenotheca in 1987.

== Description ==
Chaenotheca cinerea forms a thin thallus—the main body of the lichen—that is fully exposed rather than hidden beneath bark. It appears grey-white and ranges from a dusting of fine grains to a warty, uneven crust; in sheltered crevices it may sink almost entirely into the substrate. The algal partner (Stichococcus) occupies a narrow layer just below the surface, supplying the fungus with photosynthate while tolerating the intermittent drying typical of exposed bark.

The species is best recognised by its minute "pin-lichen" fruiting bodies. Each consists of a stalk and a head, together standing only 0.6–1 mm tall. The stalk is thread-thin (about 0.07–0.12 mm wide) and two-toned: the upper part is dark but masked by a thick, powdery white bloom (pruina), whereas the lower part is pale brown to nearly white. Microscopy shows that the stalk's outer skin is colourless and gelatinous, built from hyphae oriented parallel to the surface. The head is obovoid to inverted-cone shaped and is encircled by a well-developed rim (exciple) that often splits irregularly; its underside carries a dense white pruina, while the interior mass of freed spores (the mazaedium) is dark brown. Inside, the asci—sac-like spore factories—develop in chains rather than singly and vary in shape from ellipsoidal to irregular. Each ascus releases spherical, smooth ascospores about 4.5–5.5 micrometres across, sometimes marked by faint cracks.
