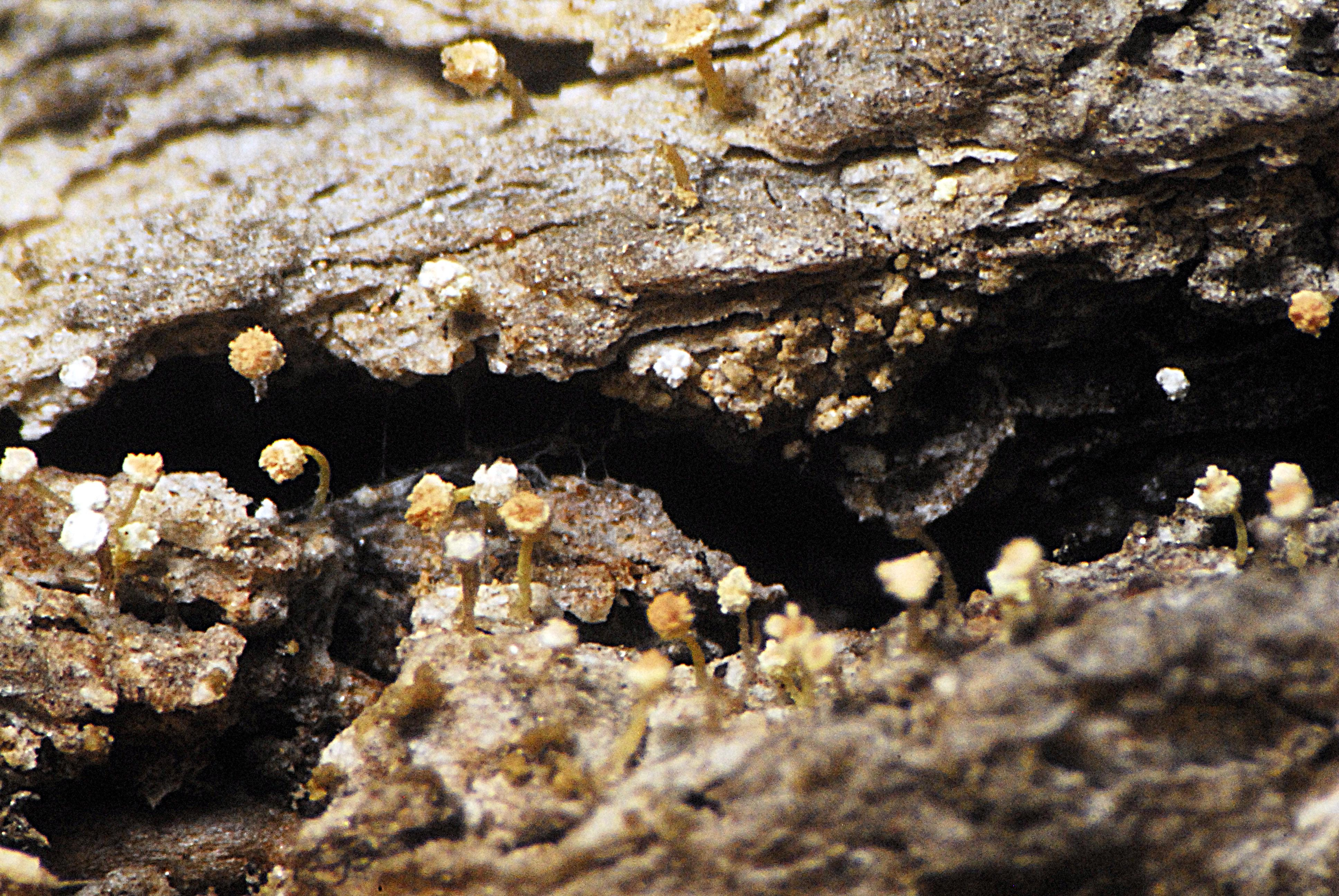

Scientific classification
- Domain: Eukaryota
- Kingdom: Fungi
- Division: Ascomycota
- Class: Coniocybomycetes
- Order: Coniocybales
- Family: Coniocybaceae
- Genus: Sclerophora
- Species: S. pallida

Binomial name
- Sclerophora pallida (Pers.) Y.J.Yao & Spooner (1999)

Synonyms
- List: Calicium pallidum Pers. (1794); Coniocybe pallida (Pers.) Fr. (1824); Coniocybe stilbea var. pallida (Pers.) Körb. (1855); Fulgia pallida (Pers.) Trevis. (1862); Chaenotheca pallida (Pers.) Stizenb. (1862); Coniocybe nivea var. pallida (Pers.) Arnold (1885); Roesleria pallida (Pers.) Sacc. (1889); Pseudo-coniocybe pallida (Pers.) Marchand (1896); Pilacre pallida (Pers.) Boud. (1907); Trichia nivea Hoffm. (1790); Stemonitis nivea J.F.Gmel. (1792); Coniocybe pallida var. nivea Zahlbr. (1922); Coniocybe nivea (J.F.Gmel.) Arnold (1885); Sclerophora nivea (J.F.Gmel.) Tibell (1984); Coniocybe coniophaea Norman (1868); Roesleria coniophaea (Norman) H.Magn. (1936); Coniocybe nivea var. coniophaea (Norman) Keissl. (1938); Coniocybe pallida var. coniophaea (Norman) Oxner (1956); Chaenotheca coniophaea (Norman) Tibell (1984); Sclerophora coniophaea (Norman) Mattsson & Middelb. (1987)

= Sclerophora pallida =

Species of lichen

Sclerophora pallida is a crustose lichen species in the family Coniocybaceae. First described by Christiaan Hendrik Persoon in 1794, it has undergone numerous taxonomic revisions before receiving its current scientific name in 1999. The species is characterised by its bark-immersed thallus and distinctive stalked, pin-like fruiting bodies that grow to 0.4–0.7 mm tall with pale yellow stalks that turn grey with age. These structures produce a mazaedium (powdery spore mass) containing spherical, warty ascospores measuring 7–8 micrometres in diameter. Though considered the most common member of its genus, S. pallida remains rare and is listed as threatened throughout much of its range. It primarily grows on the bark of old deciduous trees, particularly elm, ash and oak, and is widely distributed across Europe, with occurrences also documented in Siberia, North America and Japan.

== Taxonomy ==
Sclerophora pallida is a lichen-forming fungus with a complex taxonomic history involving several name changes and classification adjustments. The species belongs to the family Coniocybaceae within the Ascomycota.

The species was first described by Christiaan Hendrik Persoon as Calicium pallidum in 1794. It was later transferred to different genera, being known as Coniocybe pallida (Pers.) Fr. when Elias Magnus Fries made the new combination in 1824, and then as Roesleria pallida (Pers.) Sacc. when Pier Andrea Saccardo transferred it in 1881.

The taxonomic confusion arose partly because non-lichenized fungi in the genus Roesleria, particularly R. hypogaea (now known as R. subterranea), were sometimes misidentified as this species due to their similar mazaediate (powdery spore mass) fruiting bodies. Yao and Spooner formally established the current binomial name Sclerophora pallida in 1999 when they transferred the species to the genus Sclerophora.

Sclerophora pallida has also been known under the synonym Sclerophora nivea Tibell (1984), which was based on Trichia nivea Hoffm. (1790). However, since Hoffmann's name was illegitimate as a later homonym of Trichia nivea O.F.Müll. (1778), and since Persoon's epithet predates it, the name S. pallida takes precedence.

== Description ==
Sclerophora pallida is a crustose lichen species characterised by its immersed thallus (the main body of the lichen) that grows embedded within its substrate. The most distinctive features of this lichen are its small, stalked reproductive structures called apothecia, which measure 0.4–0.7 mm in height. These apothecia have slender stalks (0.06–0.1 mm in diameter) and are topped with a fertile head containing spores.

The base of the fertile head is surrounded by a well-developed raised rim called an exciple, which forms a collar-like structure where it meets the stalk. When fresh and moist, the lower surface of the head and the stalk appear pale yellow and somewhat translucent. As the apothecia age, they turn grey and lose their powdery coating (known as pruina).

Young apothecia of Sclerophora pallida begin as sessile (attached directly to the substrate without a stalk), globe-shaped structures covered with a yellow powdery substance. The mazaedium—a specialized spore mass found at the top of the fruiting body—is pale brown and contains minute dark yellow crystals that turn purple-violet when tested with potassium hydroxide solution (K+).

The reproductive spores (ascospores) of this lichen are spherical, measuring 7–8 μm in diameter, and have a distinctive surface ornamentation resembling small warts.

== Similar species ==
Sclerophora pallida can be distinguished from other closely related species in the genus Sclerophora by a combination of morphological features. The diagnostic features for distinguishing these species include fruiting body height, stalk thickness, capitulum and stalk colour, pruina characteristics on both the capitulum and its margin, and spore size and ornamentation. Sclerophora amabilis differs from S. pallida in having smaller spores (5–6 μm vs. 7–8 μm in S. pallida) and taller fruiting bodies (0.6–1.7 mm vs. 0.4–0.7 mm). S. amabilis has distinctly reddish-brown to pinkish-brown stalks that are undusted except at the transition to the capitulum, while S. pallida has pale straw-coloured stalks that turn grey with age. Young apothecia of S. amabilis have brightly yellow-pruinose heads that later become pinkish-brown to ochre, whereas S. pallida has pale yellow pruinose heads that later become pale ochre.

Sclerophora farinacea has thicker white pruina on the margin of the capitulum (compared to S. pallida's indistinct whitish to pale yellowish pruina). S. farinacea also has medium to dark brown stalks (0.7–1.2 mm tall), contrasting with the straw-coloured stalks of S. pallida. While both species have similar spore sizes (7–8 μm), their overall appearance differs significantly due to the pruina characteristics. Sclerophora peronella is another related species that can be confused with S. pallida, though it has distinctive features of its own that separate it from the other members of the genus.

== Habitat and distribution ==
Sclerophora pallida establishes itself within the dried fissures of bark and on the woody surfaces of broadleaf trees. It is considered the most common member of the genus Sclerophora, though still rare in absolute terms. The species primarily grows on dry bark and wood of old deciduous trees, particularly Ulmus (elm), Fraxinus (ash), or Quercus (oak), either as solitary trees or in well-lit woods.

The lichen has a wide distribution covering most of Europe but excluding the northernmost and southernmost parts where its natural tree substrates do not occur. In the United Kingdom, it occurs in England and in Scotland. It has also been found in Ukraine, Belarus, Lithuania, Poland, Macedonia, Austria (specifically in the Karwendel Mountains at elevations around 1180 metres), and throughout continental Europe. In Norway, it has been documented at Østensjøvannet in Oslo, where it grows on several old elm and ash trees and has likely been present since at least 1865. In the Czech Republic, it has been recorded from various parts of the territory and was historically most frequent in colline to submontane forests, though recent records come primarily from mountain belts.

Beyond Europe, the species has been documented in Siberia, North America, and Japan. Despite its wide distribution, the species appears to prefer areas with favourable mesoclimatic conditions, often in mature forests or in avenue trees with long ecological continuity. The species is considered rare to extremely rare throughout its range and faces significant conservation concerns. It is listed as regionally extinct (RE) in Denmark, critically endangered (CR) in Germany, Poland, and Slovakia, and vulnerable (VU) in Austria, Finland, Great Britain, and Switzerland. In Norway, it is classified as near threatened (NT) on the national Regional Red List.
