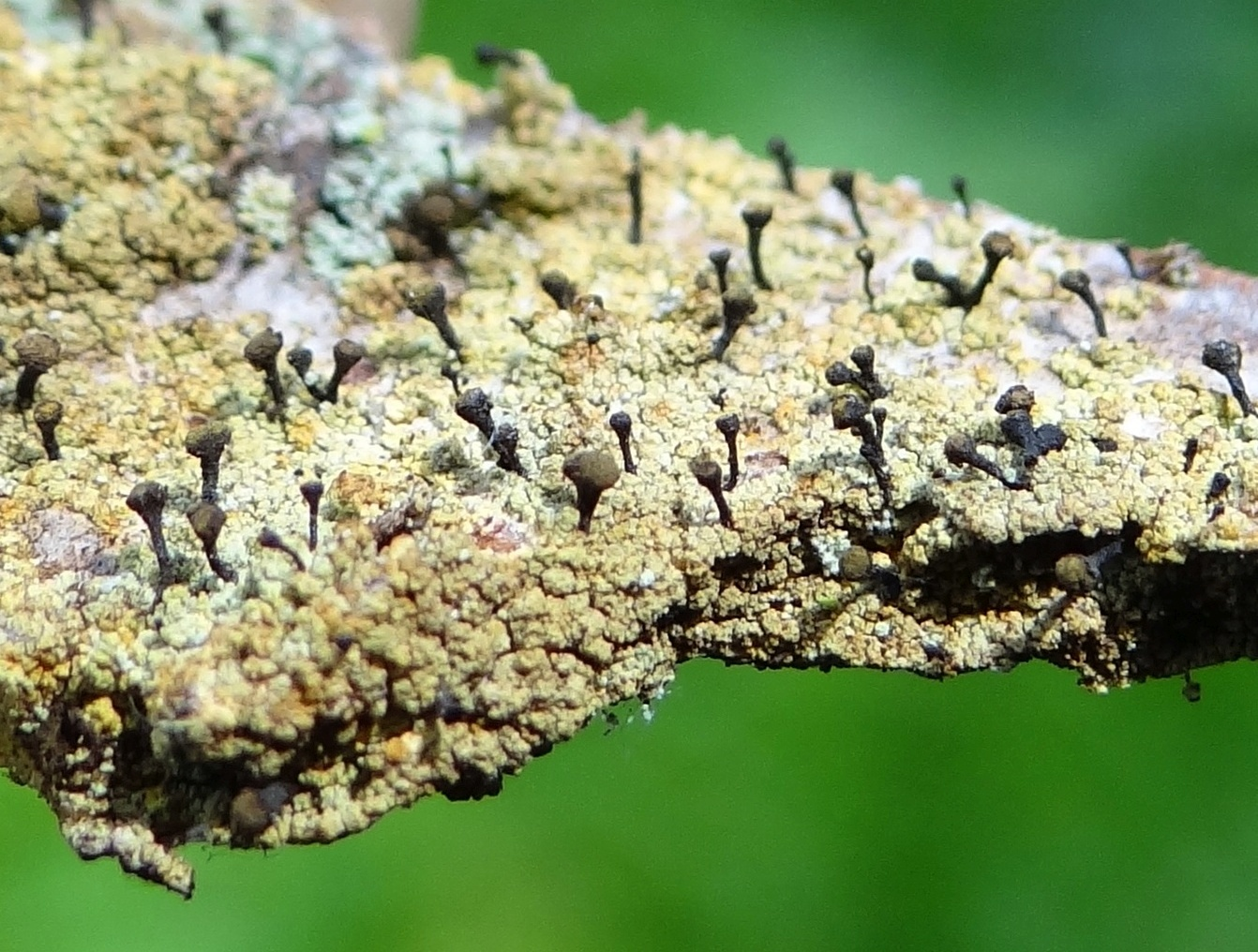
- Chaenotheca ferruginea growing on wood

Conservation status
- Apparently Secure (NatureServe)

Scientific classification
- Kingdom: Fungi
- Division: Ascomycota
- Class: Coniocybomycetes
- Order: Coniocybales
- Family: Coniocybaceae
- Genus: Chaenotheca
- Species: C. ferruginea

Binomial name
- Chaenotheca ferruginea Th. M. Fries (1860)

Synonyms
- Calicium ferrugineum (Turner); Cyphelium ferrugineum (Ach.); Phacotrum ferrugineum (Gray)

= Chaenotheca ferruginea =

Species of lichen

Chaenotheca ferruginea commonly known as the rusty stubble lichen, is a species of lichenized fungus that grows on willow tree bark as well as other sources of wood. This lichen species was originally discovered in the United Kingdom. However, there have since been many observations across the world, including in the United States, Europe, and in Australia. This species was originally described within the genus Calicium but has since been placed into the genus Chaenotheca.

== Taxonomy ==
This lichen was first described in 1812 in the literature of English Botany, edited and published by James Sowerby. This was within a much larger, comprehensive collection of illustrations and descriptions of various flora. The work contained multiple lichens, including those now considered in the genus Chaenotheca.

Since the discovery of this organism, most Chaenotheca were referred to as part of the genus Calicium, mainly due to the work of Erik Acharius. This genus was characterized by the presence of a calicoid thallus with stalked apothecia that produce simple, pigmented, spherical spores. Since this discovery, numerous species have been described.

However, later on the use of the genus Calicium to describe specimens that now belong to the genus Chaenotheca was seen as inaccurate. Theodor Magnus Fries described this genus and proposed the placement of 8 of the species that were previously identified in Calicium into the genus Chaenothecia.

=== Etymology ===
The genus Chaenotheca can be split into Chaeno- and -theca. In Latin, Chaeno has the meaning of haired or bristled. Theca comes from Latin as well and has a meaning of encased or encapsulated.

=== Genetic evaluation ===
In 2013, a genomic study was published discussing the phylogenetic placement of calicoid fungi, which are those with a wart like thallus with regions above and below the substrate, including what is now Chaenotheca ferruginea. This analysis discussed the placement of multiple Classes and Orders, including Coniocybacae. This paper proposed the new Class and Order which is now Coniocybomycetes and Conioybales respectively. The genetic analysis of many lichens in the genus Chaenotheca were placed into this grouping as well. Another, more recent, phylogenetic analysis, conducted in 2023, focusing on the ITS region of the species within the genus Chaenotheca and its close relatives further showed the differences between some of the subgroups within Coniocybales.

== Characteristics ==
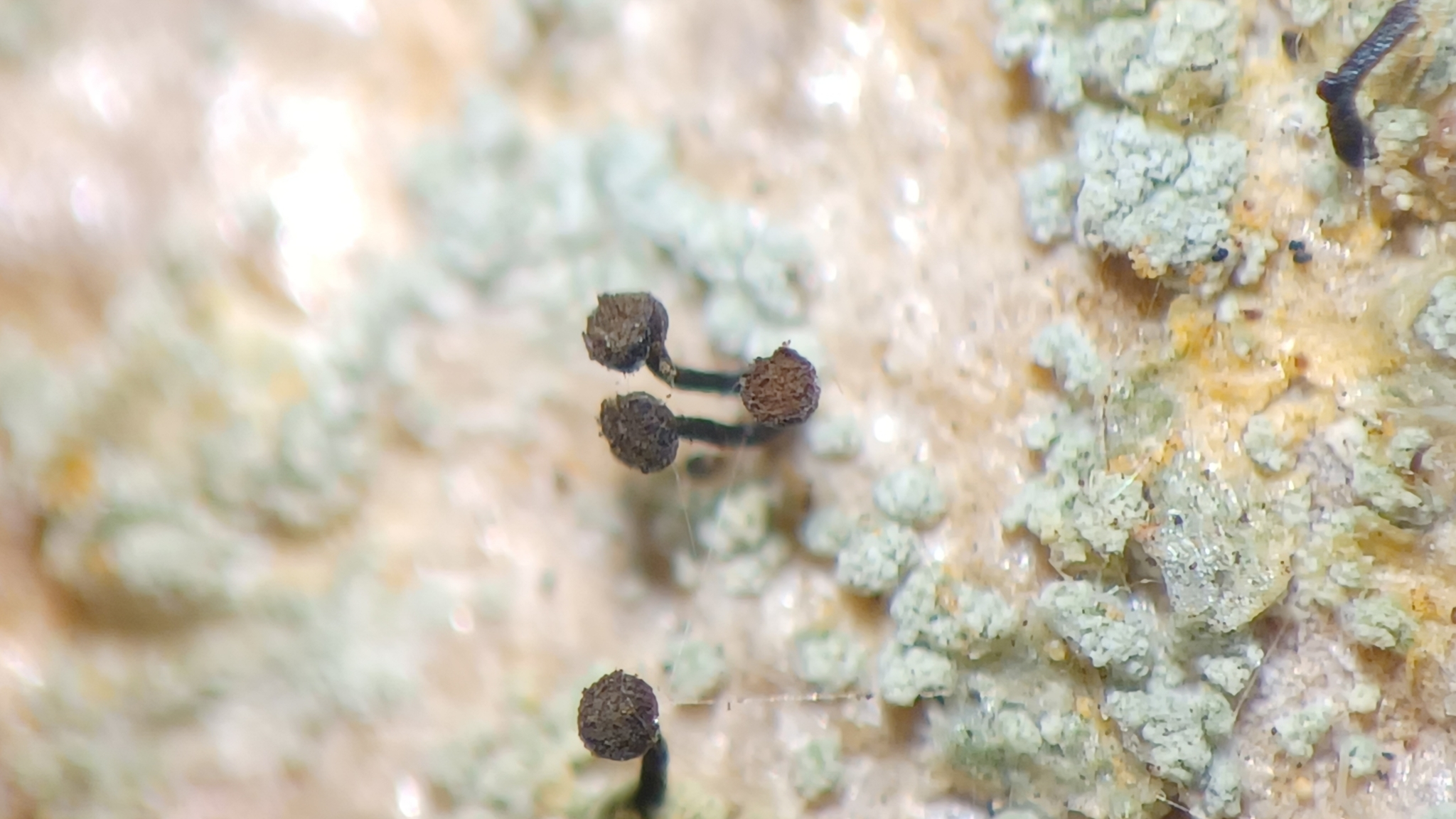
Stalked apothecia of Chaenotheca ferruginea

The macroscopic appearance of this lichen is quite distinct. It is recognizable by the apparent wart-like thallus and very apparent stalked apothecia that are quite small and have a pin or needle-like appearance. The thallus of this lichen is typically a light gray, with patches of yellow or red-orange as well. The appearance is verrucose, meaning that it has patches of thallus elevated above the substrate as well as growth beneath.

Additionally, the very distinct apothecial structures are typically a shiny black color with a lighter, sometimes orange top. These stalked structures tend to be 1 to 2 millimeters tall with a stalk width of between 0.07 and 0.15 millimeters.These structures are a key feature of those within the order Coniocybales. Additionally it is of note that the apothecia on these stalked structures are convex, whereas most are usually cup shaped.

=== Distinct features ===
In addition to the very visual features associated with Chaenotheca ferruginea there are more features that cannot be seen by observation alone. This genus tends to have a sterile thallus, meaning that no asexual reproduction has been observed with this genus. Additionally, the tissue of the thallus contains a distinct yellow-red color and stains red under a Prussian Blue stain, meaning that there is little to no ferrous iron present in the tissue.

=== Morphology ===
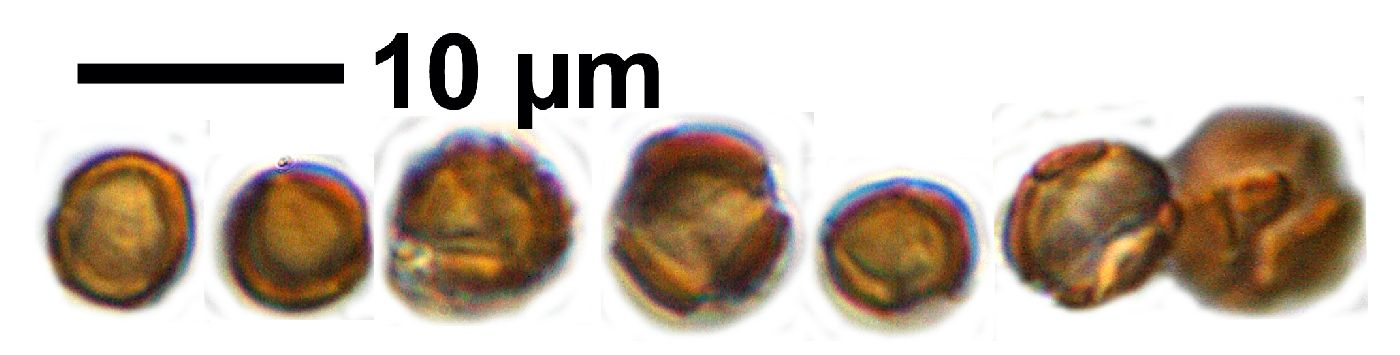
Spores visualized from a sample of Chaenotheca ferruginea

The distinct convex apothecium contains groups of asci bundled together alongside sterile hyphae that grow from the center of the stalk. These asci tend to be cylindrical in shape and contain 8 ascospores each. Additionally, the arrangement of these ascospores can be either in 1 or 2 rows, still coming to a total of 8 ascospores per asci.

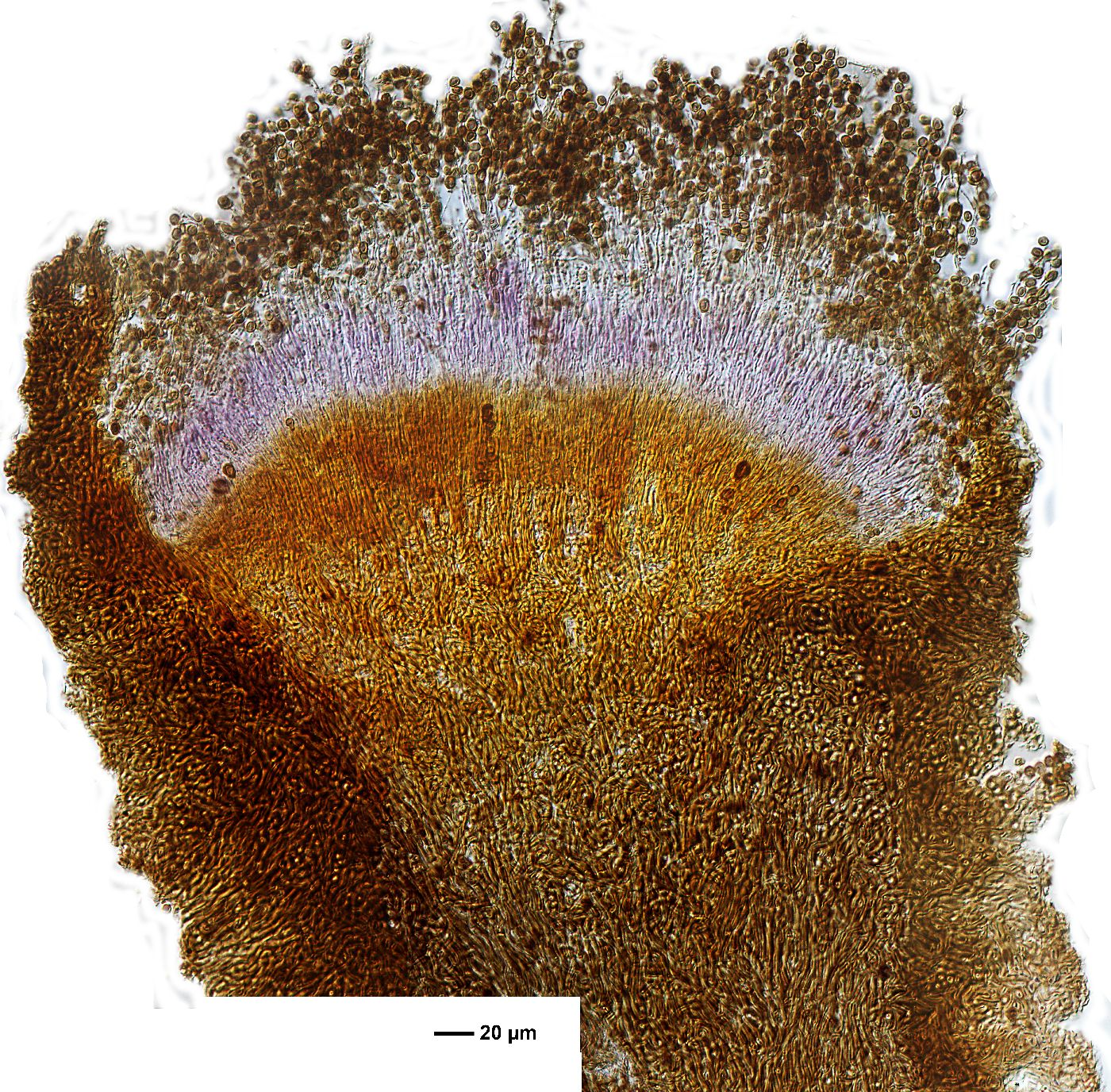
Cross sectional view of the apothecium of Chaenotheca ferruginea

The spores of this organism are distinct in their shape and coloration. The ascospores of this fungus are globose, or spherical and have a distinct yellow-brown coloration. Another notable characteristic of these spores is that they are fissured in their structure. Under a microscope this appears as defined creases in the spore. However, this fissured feature is mainly observed in mature spores. These spores tend to be 7 to 8 micrometers in diameter as well.

The photobiont that this fungus forms a lichenized structure alongside is typically of the genus Trebouxia, which is a form of green algae. There are other genera that species in the genus Chaenotheca will form a lichen with, but still these are typically still other green algae. Trebouxia in particular is a green, globose algae that lives in conjunction with Chaenotheca ferruginea.

== Ecology ==
=== Distribution ===
Chaenotheca ferruginea is widely distributed across Europe and is also somewhat prolific on the East and West coasts of the United States. However, there have been observations of this species globally, including in Costa Rica, Argentina, Australia, and New Zealand.

=== Human impact ===
This organism tends to grow on bark and other sources of wood including tree stumps and wood fences. It is very common in Europe so it could be considered to be a slight concern in terms of cosmetics, however it is very unlikely that this is a significant issue caused by this lichen. Additionally, since they are so prolific and are not heavily impacted by atmospheric SO2, the Conservation Designations for UK Taxa has labelled this species as not endangered or threatened.
