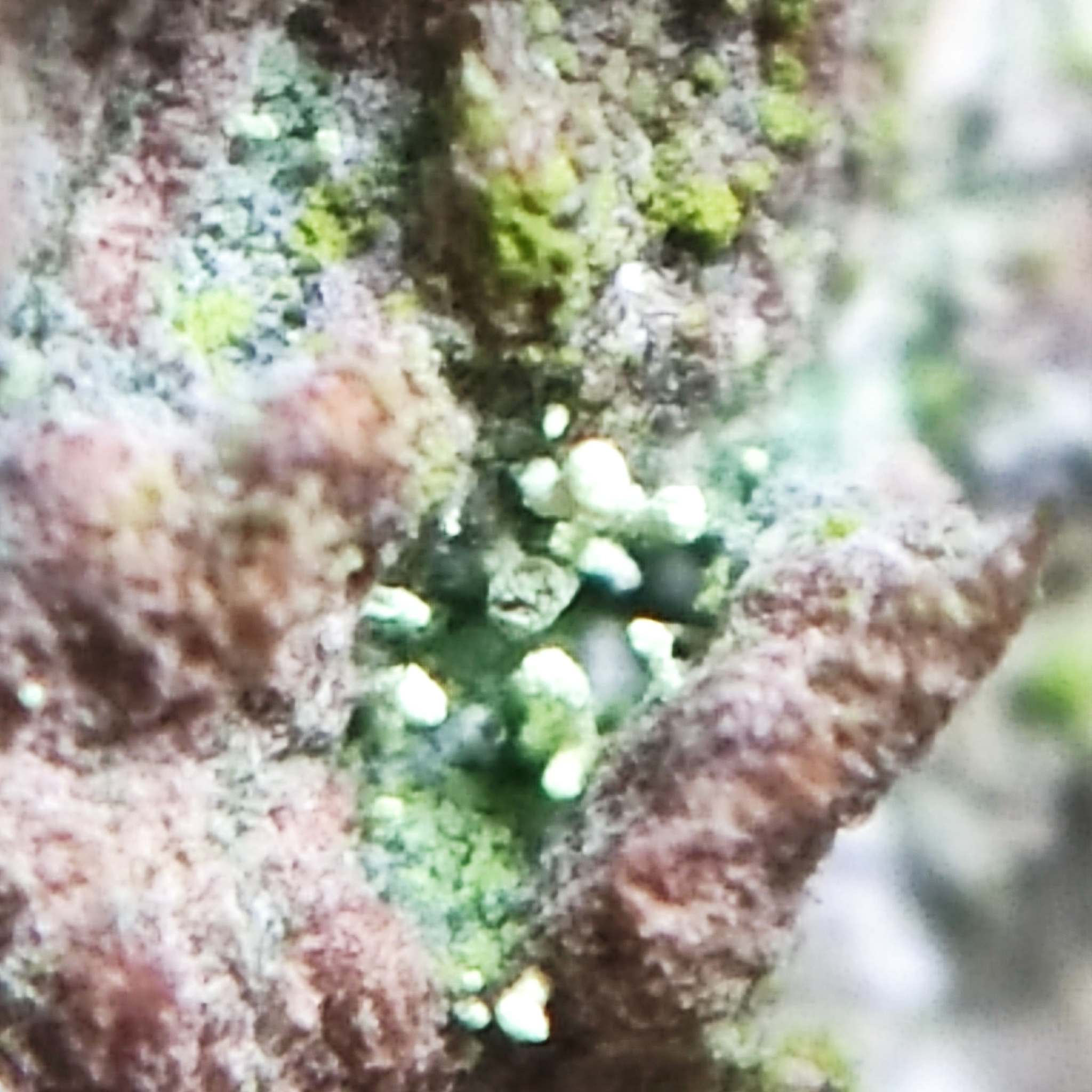

Scientific classification
- Domain: Eukaryota
- Kingdom: Fungi
- Division: Ascomycota
- Class: Coniocybomycetes
- Order: Coniocybales
- Family: Coniocybaceae
- Genus: Chaenotheca
- Species: C. brachypoda

Binomial name
- Chaenotheca brachypoda (Ach.) Tibell (1987)

Synonyms
- Lichen sulphureus Retz. (1769); Coniocybe brachypoda Ach. (1816); Calicium furfuraceum var. sulphurellum Link (1833); Coniocybe furfuracea subsp. brachypoda (Ach.) Arnold (1885); Coniocybe sulphurea (Retz.) Nyl. (1886); Chaenotheca sulphurea (Retz.) Middelb. & Mattsson (1987)

= Chaenotheca brachypoda =

Species of lichen

Chaenotheca brachypoda is a species of lichen in the family Coniocybaceae. This tiny pin lichen is almost invisible except for its minute fruiting structures that rise like microscopic pins from tree bark, each topped with a yellow-green, frost-like coating containing distinctive acids. Originally described in 1816 from specimens growing on pine logs in Sweden, it lives mostly hidden within the bark of its host tree, with only hair-fine stalks extending upward to release powdery spores from spherical heads barely 0.2 mm across.

== Taxonomy ==
The lichen was first described in 1816 by Erik Acharius as Coniocybe brachypoda. Acharius distinguished the species by its areolate-leproso greyish crust, spherical yellowish-farinose apothecia (fruiting bodies) on short thick stalks, and yellowish powdery spores. He noted that the species grows on wood, specifically on truncated pine logs in Sweden, and mentioned existing specimens in the herbarium at the eye level. Acharius compared it to Calicium chlorellum, noting that while it sometimes grows on the same wood and crust, C. brachypoda has a larger capitulum than Coniocybe furfuracea. Leif Tibell transferred the taxon to the genus Chaenotheca in 1987.

== Description ==
Chaenotheca brachypoda is a tiny pin lichen whose main body (the thallus) lives almost entirely inside the bark it colonises, so little more than a faint stain is usually visible on the surface. Its internal algal partner (Stichococcus) forms a thin green layer that keeps the lichen self-sufficient by providing photosynthate. Above the bark rise the minute fruiting structures that give the species its pin-like appearance. Each consists of a hair-fine stalk only 0.04–0.08 mm thick that lifts the spore-bearing head 0.4–1.4 mm into the air. Both stalk and head are cloaked in a dense yellow-green pruina—a frost-like coating of crystalline pigments containing vulpinic and pulvinic acids—which sometimes leaves the lower half of the stalk exposed as glossy black. The head itself is near-spherical, just 0.1–0.2 mm across. Its outer rim (exciple) is poorly developed and may appear only as a slight collar sitting below the dark-brown mazaedium, the powdery mass of mature spores.

Microscopically, the sacs that produce spores (asci) grow in chains and vary in outline from cylindrical to irregular. Each ascus releases numerous spherical to cuboid ascospores 3–4 μm in diameter. The spore walls are unevenly thickened and show a network of fine cracks, features that help separate C. brachypoda from closely related species.
