= Chaenotheca papuensis =

Scientific classification
- Kingdom: Fungi
- Division: Ascomycota
- Class: Coniocybomycetes
- Order: Coniocybales
- Family: Coniocybaceae
- Genus: Chaenotheca
- Species: C. papuensis

Binomial name
- Chaenotheca papuensis Aptroot & Tibell (2003)
- Holotype: Myola, Papua New Guinea

Species of lichen

Chaenotheca papuensis is a species of crustose lichen in the family Coniocybaceae. Found in Papua New Guinea, it was formally described as a new species in 2003 by the lichenologists André Aptroot and Leif Tibell. The type specimen was collected by Aptroot in 1995 from the Owen Stanley Range, (Oro Province) at an elevation of about 2,100 m (6,900 ft); there, in the remote mountain village Myola, it was found growing on the bark of huts and on wood.

The lichen has a pale grey thallus that grows superficially on its substrate. It has a somewhat pimply ("minutely verrucose") to areolate texture. The green algal photobiont partner is trebouxioid. In terms of chemical spot tests, the thallus is K+ (yellow), C−, KC−, and PD+ (yellow); pruina on the apothecia (fruiting bodies) of the lichen consists of vulpinic acid. Distinguishing features of the lichen include its sturdy apothecia, the thick lemon-yellow pruina on its lower capitulum and stalk, and its relatively small spherical to somewhat ellipsoidal spores that measure 3.5–4.5 micrometres. These spores are ornamented on their surfaces with irregular polygonal areas outlined by thin cracks.

The South African species Chaenotheca chloroxantha is somewhat similar in appearance, but is distinguished from C. papuensis by its more slender apothecia and larger spores.
