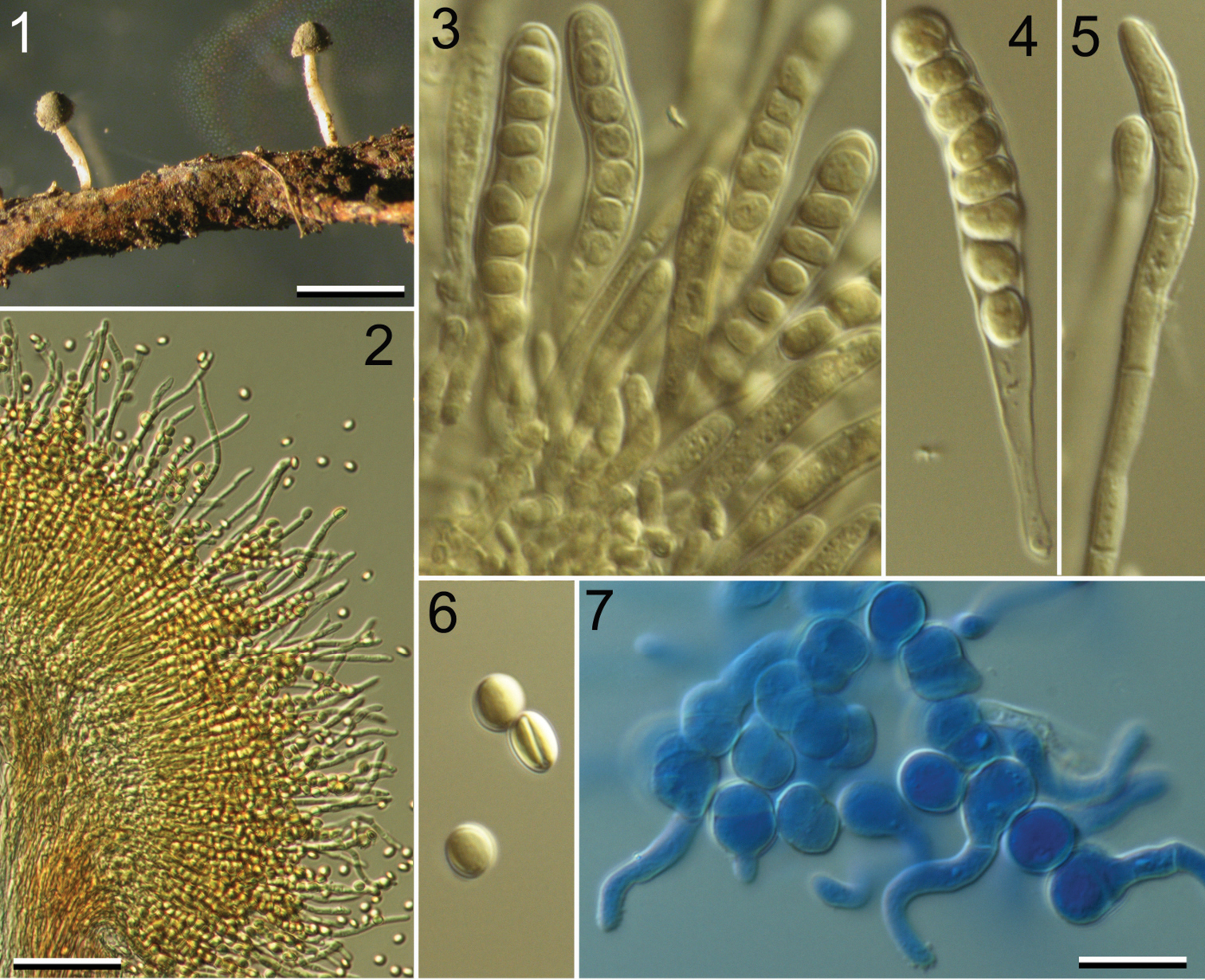
- Roesleria subterranea

Scientific classification
- Kingdom: Fungi
- Division: Ascomycota
- Class: incertae sedis
- Order: incertae sedis
- Family: Roesleriaceae
- Genus: Roesleria Thüm. & Pass. (1877)

Type species
- Roesleria subterranea (Weinm.) Redhead (1985)

Synonyms
- Paracudonia Petr. (1927)

= Roesleria =

Genus of fungi

Roesleria is a fungal genus in the family Roesleriaceae.

The genus was circumscribed by Felix Karl Albert Ernst Joachim von Thümen-Gräfendorf and Giovanni Passerini in Oesterr. Bot. Z. vol.27 on page 270 in 1877.

The genus name of Roesleria is in honour of Leonard Roesler (1839–1910), who was a German-Austrian chemist and oenologist, he was Professor at the Technical University of Karlsruhe in 1867.

== Species ==
As accepted by Species Fungorum;

- Roesleria brasiliana Viégas (1947)
- Roesleria bubonis (Rostr.) Sacc. & Trotter (1913)
- Roesleria norrlinii Vain. (1927)
- Roesleria subterranea (Weinm.) Redhead (1985)

Former species;

- R. coniophaea (Norman) H. Magn. (1936) = Sclerophora pallida Coniocybaceae
- R. hyalinella (Nyl.) Sacc. (1889) = Sclerophora peronella
- R. hypogaea Thüm. & Pass. (1877) = Roesleria subterranea
- R. pallida sensu auct. p.p., = Roesleria subterranea
- R. pallida (Pers.) Sacc. (1889) = Sclerophora pallida
- R. pallida var. farinacea (Chevall.) Sacc. & Traverso (1911) = Sclerophora farinacea
- R. pilacriformis (Rehm) Henn. (1895)= Roesleria subterranea

== See also ==
- List of Ascomycota genera incertae sedis
