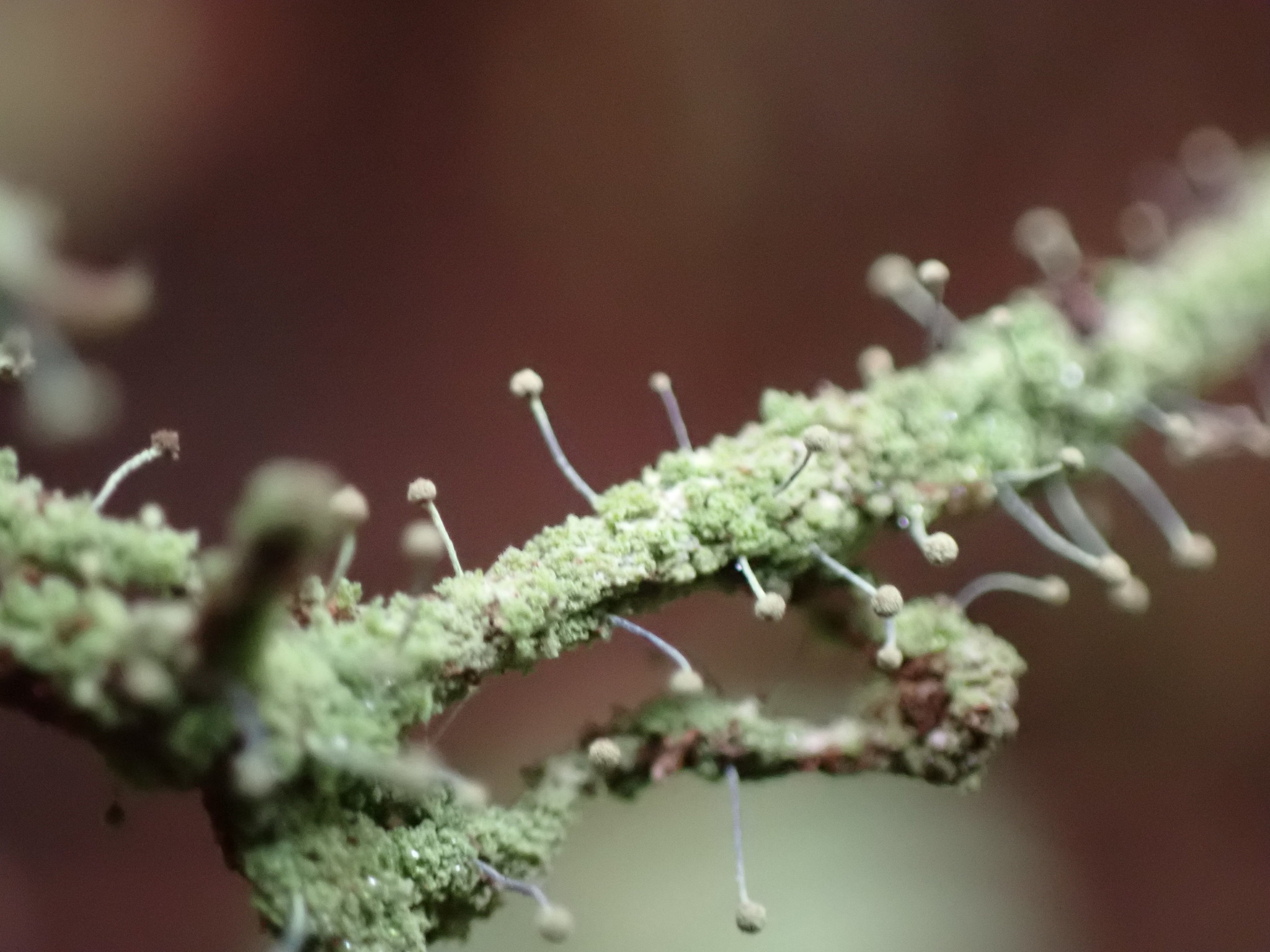

Conservation status
- Apparently Secure (NatureServe)

Scientific classification
- Kingdom: Fungi
- Division: Ascomycota
- Class: Coniocybomycetes
- Order: Coniocybales
- Family: Coniocybaceae
- Genus: Chaenotheca
- Species: C. furfuracea

Binomial name
- Chaenotheca furfuracea (L.) Tibell (1984)

Synonyms
- Mucor furfuraceus L. (1753); Coniocybe furfuracea (L.) Ach. (1816)

= Chaenotheca furfuracea =

Species of lichen-forming fungus

Chaenotheca furfuracea is a mealy (farinaceous), bright yellow-green leprose pin lichen. It is in the family Coniocybaceae. This distinctive lichen forms vivid yellow-green powdery crusts on tree bark and produces tiny pin-like fruiting bodies up to 2 mm tall, each with a hair-thin stalk topped by a spherical head. It grows in damp, deeply shaded locations such as tree root crevices and rocky overhangs, particularly in upland areas of Europe where it grows mainly on beeches, oaks, and spruce roots.

== Description ==
Chaenotheca furfuracea forms a loose, powdery (leprose) crust that spreads across bark as a vivid yellow-green stain. The photobiont—the lichen's algal partner—is a species of Stichococcus, whose tiny green cells sit just below the surface and provide photosynthate. Rising from the crust are pin-like fruiting bodies up to about 2 mm tall. Each comprises a hair-fine stalk (roughly one-tenth of a millimetre thick) that is sheathed in a yellow-green, frost-like coating of crystalline pigment called pruina; the stalk appears black where this coating wears away. At the tip sits a near-spherical head only 0.1–0.2 mm across. Its outer rim (exciple) is so poorly developed that it is scarcely visible, and the interior spore mass (mazaedium) begins life dusted with the same yellow-green pruina before ageing to a pale brown.

Under the microscope the spore-producing sacs (asci) are irregular in outline and develop in chains rather than singly. Each ascus releases numerous microscopic ascospores that are spherical, only 2.3–3 μm in diameter, and ornamented with a maze of fine ridges (reticulations) that may look like tiny warts under a light microscope. The lichen lacks specialised conidiomata—structures that many fungi use for asexual propagation—but does form simple, upright threads (conidiophores) that bud off colourless, ellipsoidal conidia in loose chains. Chemical spot tests reveal the presence of vulpinic acid, pulvinic acid, and pulvinic dilactone in both the crust and the pruina, compounds that lend the species its characteristic yellow-green hue.

== Habitat and distribution ==
The species can be found in European countries like Belgium, Luxembourg, and Switzerland. The species are growing mostly on beeches and oaks, and on tree roots of spruces. They also grow on detritus or sand, and in rare cases on fissures of siliceous rocks. It does better in climates with high humidity and low luminosity. In Nepal, Chaenotheca furfuracea has been reported at 3,000 m elevation in a compilation of published records.

Chaenotheca furfuracea usually occupies damp, deeply shaded nooks—tucked into crevices between tree roots or on rocky faces beneath overhangs—and is encountered most often in upland areas.

== See also ==
- List of lichens named by Carl Linnaeus
