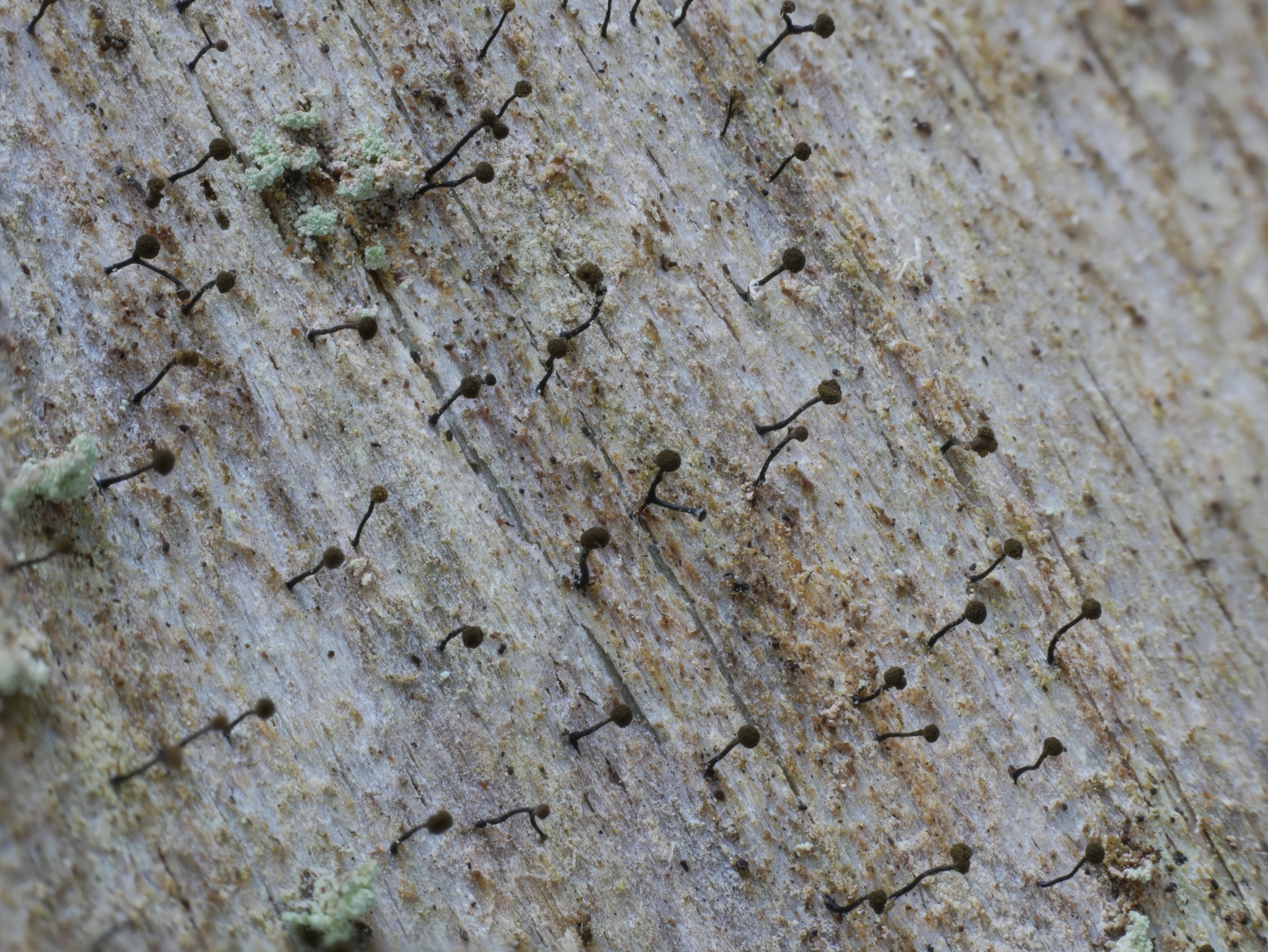

Conservation status
- Apparently Secure (NatureServe)

Scientific classification
- Kingdom: Fungi
- Division: Ascomycota
- Class: Coniocybomycetes
- Order: Coniocybales
- Family: Coniocybaceae
- Genus: Chaenotheca
- Species: C. brunneola

Binomial name
- Chaenotheca brunneola (Ach.) Müll.Arg. (1862)

Synonyms
- List: Calicium brunneolum Ach. (1816); Embolus brunneolus (Ach.) Wallr. (1831); Calicium melanophaeum var. brunneolum (Ach.) Schaer. (1833); Cyphelium brunneolum (Ach.) De Not. (1846); Calicium trichiale var. brunneolum (Ach.) Nyl. (1857); Cyphelium trichiale var. brunneolum (Ach.) Mudd (1861); Phacotium brunneolum (Ach.) Trevis. (1862); Allodium brunneolum (Ach.) Kieff. (1895); Coniocybe brunneola (Ach.) Samp. (1922)

= Chaenotheca brunneola =

Species of lichen-forming fungus

Chaenotheca brunneola, the brown-head stubble lichen, is a species of pin lichen in the family Coniocybaceae.

== Taxonmomy ==
It was first scientifically described by Erik Acharius in 1816, as Calicium brunneolum. Johannes Müller Argoviensis transferred it to the genus Chaenotheca in 1862. A common name used for the lichen in North America is "brown-head stubble lichen".

== Description ==
The thallus of Chaenotheca brunneola is immersed in its substrate, whereas the extends to 1.5 mm, upon which rests a shiny black spherical mazaedium. It makes ascospores that are colourless and spherical, measuring 3.5–4.5 μm. The green algal photobiont partner for C. brunneola is from the genera Trebouxia or Dictyochloropsis.

In a 2016 study, the authors show that Chaenotheca brunneola appears to comprise multiple distinct species that are morphologically similar but genetically different. Specimens growing on fruit bodies of the polypore fungus Trichaptum formed a separate evolutionary lineage from those growing on wood, despite looking very similar. The Trichaptum-dwelling specimens had somewhat shorter stalks and occasional K+ (red) pigmentation compared to true C. brunneola. This suggests there are cryptic species within what has been considered C. brunneola, with substrate specificity (wood vs. fungal fruit bodies) corresponding to distinct genetic lineages. The authors consider this a case of convergent evolution leading to morphologically similar but genetically distinct species adapted to different substrates.

== Habitat ==
The lichen typically grows on wood, particularly on snags (standing dead trees) of pine (Pinus sylvestris), spruce (Picea abies), and birch. It has also been reported to occasionally grow on fruiting bodies of polypore fungi, particularly Trichaptum abietinum and T. fuscoviolaceum. In Nepal, Chaenotheca brunneola has been reported from 3,000 to 3,556 m elevation in a compilation of published records.
