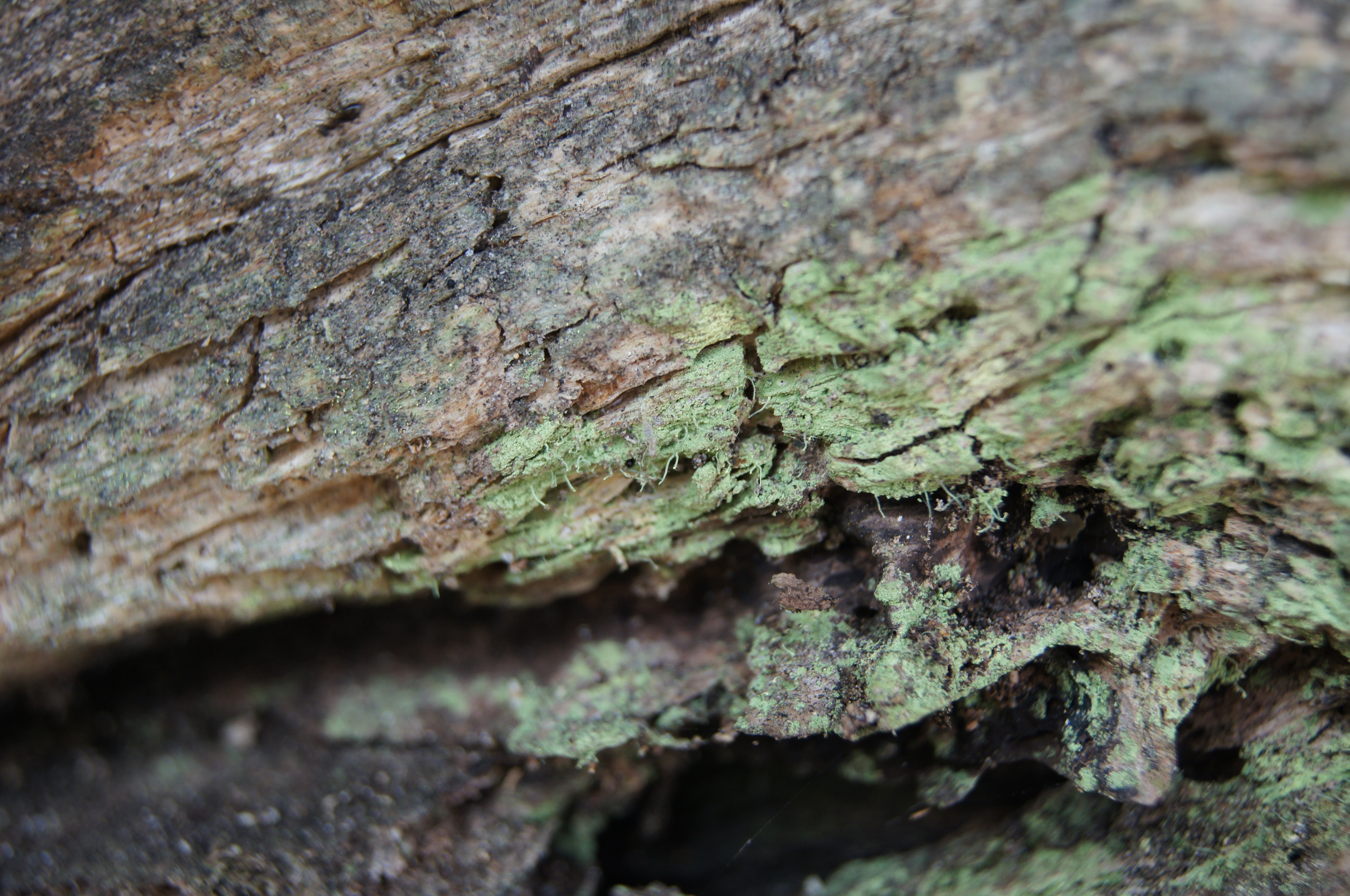

Scientific classification
- Kingdom: Fungi
- Division: Ascomycota
- Class: Coniocybomycetes
- Order: Coniocybales
- Family: Coniocybaceae
- Genus: Chaenotheca
- Species: C. chlorella

Binomial name
- Chaenotheca chlorella (Ach.) Müll.Arg. (1862)

= Chaenotheca chlorella =

Species of lichen

Chaenotheca chlorella is a species of lichen belonging to the family Coniocybaceae.

It has been found in the Alberta province of Canada, the Republic of Altai in southern Siberia, and Belarus.

Synonym:

- Calicium chlorellum Ach., 1803 (= basionym)
