= Hypotrachyna mcmulliniana =

Scientific classification
- Kingdom: Fungi
- Division: Ascomycota
- Class: Lecanoromycetes
- Order: Lecanorales
- Family: Parmeliaceae
- Genus: Hypotrachyna
- Species: H. mcmulliniana

Binomial name
- Hypotrachyna mcmulliniana Lendemer & J.L.Allen (2020)

Species of lichen-forming fungus

Hypotrachyna mcmulliniana is a species of foliose lichen in the family Parmeliaceae. It has a blue-grey thallus about 3–10 cm (1–4 in) wide, with lobes 1.0–4.0 mm wide, and isidia without hairs.

This species is most common in the southeast of North America but has been observed as far north as Connecticut. This lichen grows on conifers, hardwood trees and shrubs, and rocks. The conservation status of the lichen has not been ranked.

This species was described in 2020 by James Lendemer and Jessica Allen, and was named to honor R. Troy McMullin, a lichen researcher and educator at the Canadian Museum of Nature, in recognition of his work to describe and share lichen biodiversity in well-studied, often disturbed areas.
