= Porina chlorotica =

Scientific classification
- Domain: Eukaryota
- Kingdom: Fungi
- Division: Ascomycota
- Class: Lecanoromycetes
- Order: Gyalectales
- Family: Porinaceae
- Genus: Porina
- Species: P. chlorotica

Binomial name
- Porina chlorotica (Ach.) Müll.Arg., 1884

Synonyms
- Verrucaria chlorotica Ach. (1810)

Species of fungus

Porina chlorotica is a species of crustose lichen belonging to the family Porinaceae.
