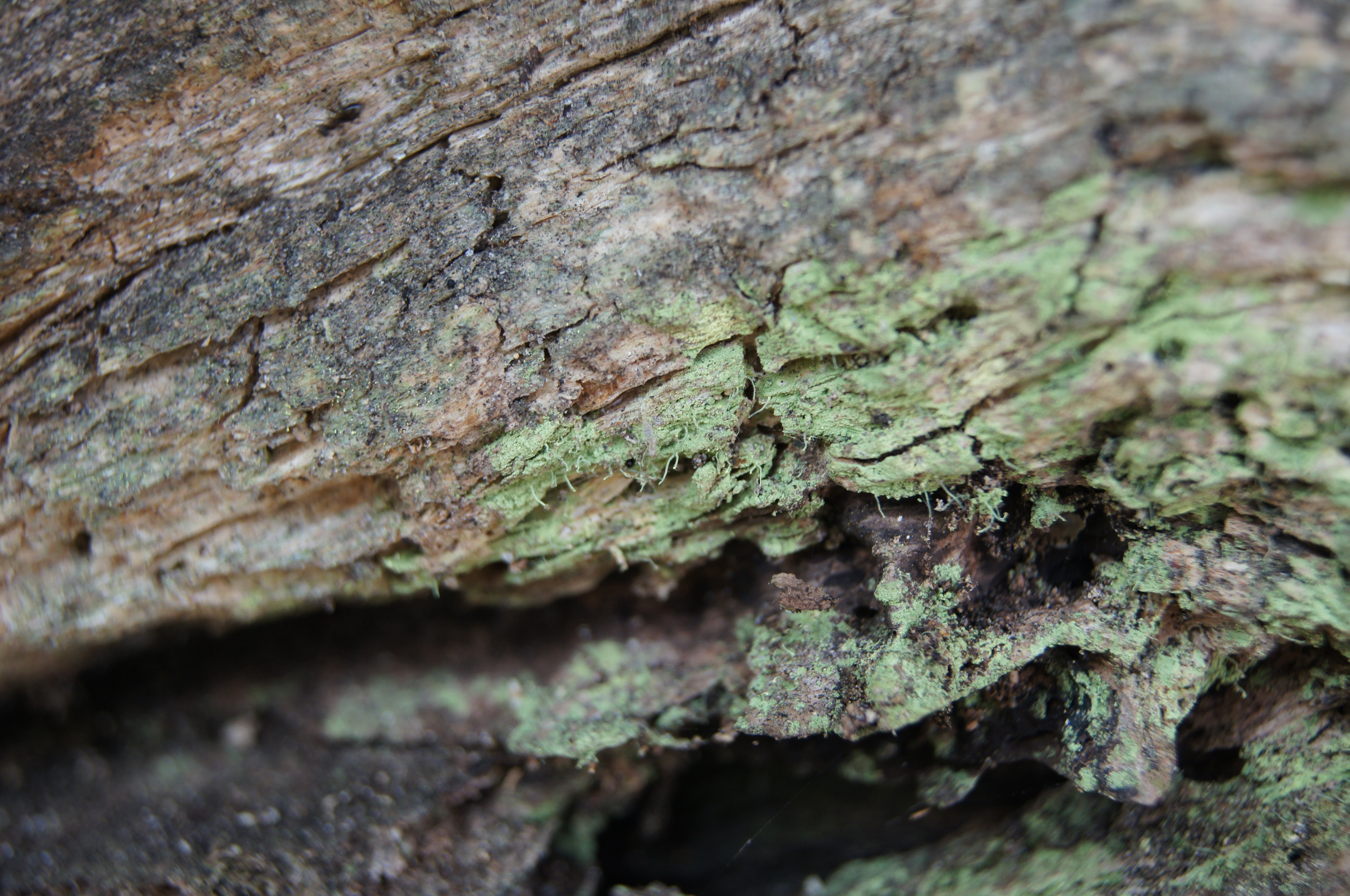
- Chaenotheca chlorella

Scientific classification
- Kingdom: Fungi
- Division: Ascomycota
- Class: Coniocybomycetes
- Order: Coniocybales
- Family: Coniocybaceae
- Genus: Chaenotheca (Th.Fr.) Th.Fr. (1860)

Type species
- Chaenotheca chrysocephala (Turner ex Ach.) Th.Fr.

Synonyms
- Calicium b Chaenotheca Th.Fr. (1856); Cybebe Tibell (1984)

= Chaenotheca =

Genus of lichen-forming fungi

Chaenotheca is a genus of lichen-forming fungi in the family Coniocybaceae. The reproduction structures are a mass of loose ascospores that are enclosed by a cup-shaped exciple sitting on top of a tiny stalk, having the appearance of a dressmaker's pin (called a mazaedium), hence the common name pin lichen. Genus members are also commonly called needle lichens. The genus has a worldwide distribution, with the greatest diversity in the temperate forests of the northern hemisphere, though species have also been recorded from the southern hemisphere including Australia, New Zealand, and South America. Species of Chaenotheca are small, inconspicuous lichens that grow mainly on bark and decaying wood in sheltered, humid, low-light microhabitats such as old-growth and ancient woodland, and are considered indicators of ecological continuity in forest environments.

== Taxonomy ==
Chaenotheca was established as a genus by Theodor Magnus Fries in 1860, but several of its species had already been treated earlier under a broader concept of Calicium by Erik Acharius (1816). Fries separated Chaenotheca from related calicioid lichens on the basis of a crustose thallus and stalked apothecia with a distinct excipulum, together with simple, pigmented, spherical spores. He also rejected the then-common practice of placing these species in "Cyphelium" as an inappropriate application of that name. The genus concept was soon widely adopted, and it was later fixed by lectotypification with Chaenotheca trichialis (Ach.) Th.Fr. by Clements and Shear (1931). In parallel, Fries and subsequent authors continued to recognise Coniocybe as a closely similar genus, traditionally separated by its more weakly developed excipulum.

More recent work has left the phylogenetic position of Chaenotheca unsettled: no close relative has been firmly identified for the genus or for the family Coniocybaceae, and both morphological and preliminary molecular evidence suggest it does not belong in the Lecanorales. In the same study, the main molecular groupings broadly matched clusters previously suggested from morphology and chemistry, but the deeper branches of the tree were weakly supported, making it impossible to determine from the internal transcribed spacer (ITS) data alone whether the two subgenera each form natural, exclusively related groups.

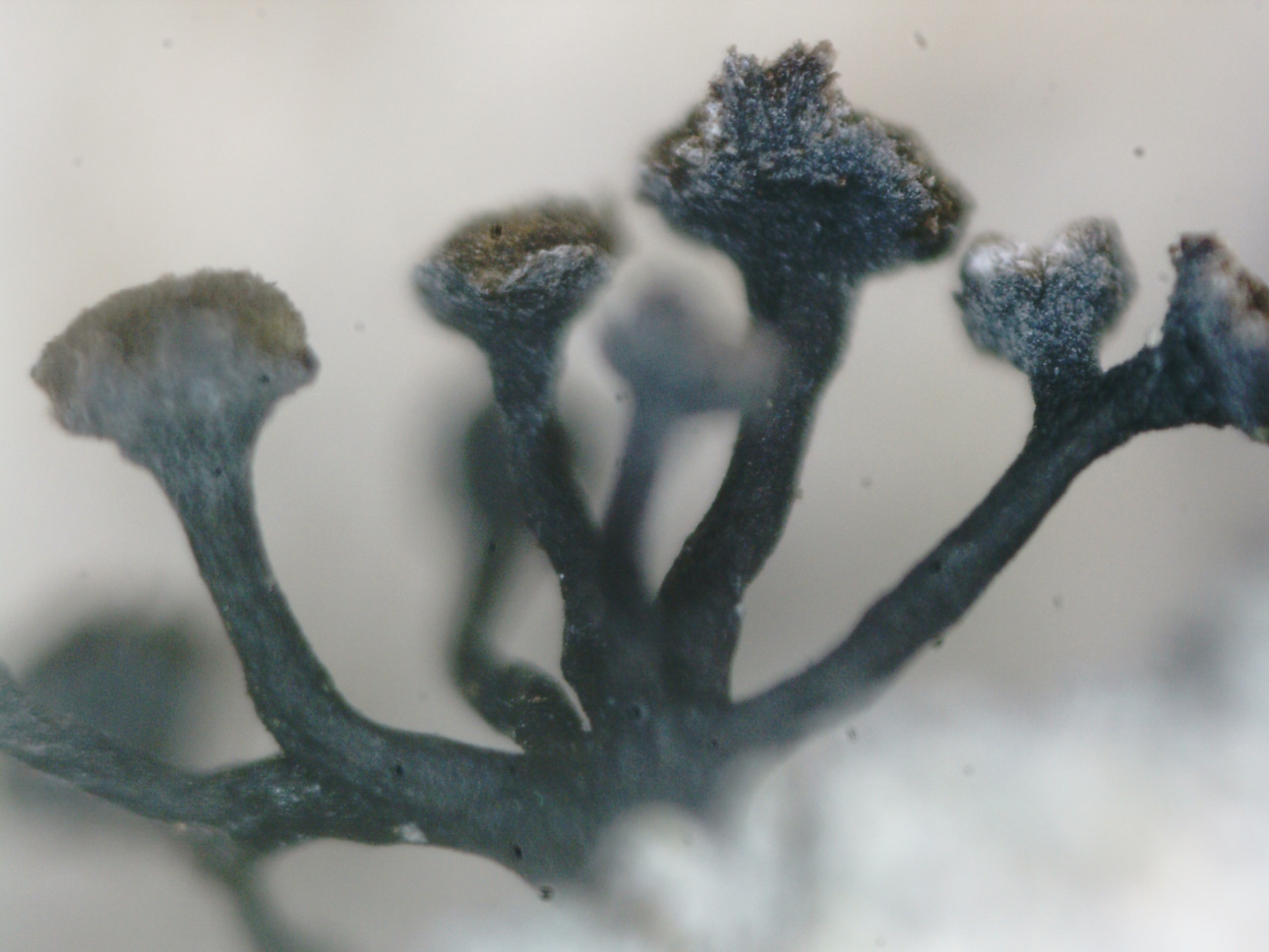
Chaenotheca ferruginea

A specialized lineage of mazaediate (producing a powdery spore mass at maturity) lichens living on the fruit bodies (sporocarps) of the polypore genus Trichaptum was long treated within Chaenotheca. Early records include a Trichaptum-inhabiting variant mentioned by Fries in 1865, and a North American taxon described as Calicium obscurum in 1909 (later treated as Chaenotheca obscura); the name Chaenotheca balsamconensis was introduced much later for the same entity. Multi-locus phylogenetic analyses support these Trichaptum specialists as a distinct lineage within Coniocybomycetes, sister to the combined clade of Chaenotheca s. lat. and Sclerophora, and they have been separated as the genus Chaenotricha with Chaenotricha obscura as the type species and Chaenotricha cilians described as a second species.

Cybebe was described as a monospecific genus for Cybebe gracilenta, separated from Chaenotheca mainly by its unusual ascus development (with asci formed in chains) and its unpigmented spore wall; however, molecular analyses place C. gracilenta well within Chaenotheca, forming a strongly supported clade with Chaenotheca gracillima. The characters used to define Cybebe are therefore best interpreted as derived features of that lineage (specialised features that evolved within that branch rather than being inherited from a common ancestor), and Cybebe is treated as a synonym of Chaenotheca.

== Fossil record ==
Chaenotheca is known from European Paleogene amber, where several specimens preserve the distinctive stalked fruiting bodies and crustose thallus typical of the genus. Four of the five Chaenotheca inclusions reported from Baltic and Bitterfeld amber are broadly similar to living species, but their exact identification is uncertain because many modern Chaenotheca species are morphologically variable and key diagnostic traits are not preserved in the fossils.

One inclusion from Priabonian Baltic amber (Samland Peninsula, near Kaliningrad; 34–38 Ma) differs from both the other fossils and described living species in several anatomical details, and has been described as the fossil species Chaenotheca succina. It has a stipe surface formed of intertwining hyphae, paraphyses persisting within the mazaedium, and a thin continuous outer layer in the ascospores. These characters have not been reported from modern members of the genus and may represent ancestral states. A separate Baltic-amber fossil shows features that closely resemble those of the modern Chaenotheca ferruginea lineage, and has been suggested as a potential minimum-age constraint for that lineage once relationships within Chaenotheca are better resolved.

== Description ==
Species of Chaenotheca are crustose lichens with a thallus that may sit on the surface of the substrate or be partly immersed in it. The thallus is variable in texture, ranging from powdery (farinose) or granular to warted (verrucose) or squamulose, and it may be grey, greenish grey, golden yellow, or brownish. The photosynthetic partner (photobiont) is a green alga, most often from Dictyochloropsis, Stichococcus, Trebouxia, or Trentepohlia.

The apothecia are stalked, with a short to long, slender stipe built from brown hyphae arranged around the axis; the head is usually globose to somewhat cone-shaped. A thalline margin is absent, and the cup-shaped exciple is typically well developed, forming as a continuation of the stalk tissue. The internal sterile tissue (hamathecium) is lacking. The asci are short-lived and vary in shape (cylindrical to ellipsoidal or irregular). They develop from ascogenous hyphae, with or without croziers, and may form singly or in chains. The ascospores are pale to dark brown and range from nearly spherical to cylindric-ellipsoid; they are usually non-septate, but are rarely 1–5-septate. As the asci break down, the spores accumulate as a dry, brown spore mass (mazaedium). Spore walls are generally thick and pigmented, and may be smooth or marked by an irregular cracked pattern. Asexual fruiting bodies (conidiomata) are usually absent in nature and have been reported only in culture. Many species produce pulvinic acid derivatives, typically as a pruina and less often within the thallus. Some also contain Pd+ (yellow-red) depsides or depsidones that remain chemically uncharacterised.

== Photobiont ==
Species of Chaenotheca form symbioses with green algae from several genera, including Symbiochloris, Trebouxia, and Tritostichococcus (in the family Trebouxiophyceae), and Trentepohlia (in the Ulvophyceae). Within the genus, photobiont choice is often consistent at the species level: individual Chaenotheca species tend to associate with only one photobiont genus rather than switching among several. Because of this apparent specificity, earlier authors sometimes treated shared photobionts as evidence of close relationships, and some infrageneric classifications explicitly used photobiont identity as a defining character. Molecular work, however, suggests a more complicated picture: some clades contain species that all share a single photobiont genus, while others include species with different photobionts, implying that switches in photobiont partner occurred at various points in the evolutionary history of the genus, and that photobiont patterns only partly agree with the inferred phylogeny.

== Habitat and distribution ==
Chaenotheca species occur mainly on bark and decaying wood, and only rarely on soil or rock. They are most often found in sheltered microhabitats where humidity remains high and light levels are low.

In Switzerland, 15 species were recorded as of 2006, most of which were recorded from montane to subalpine forests in the Northern Prealps.

== Species ==
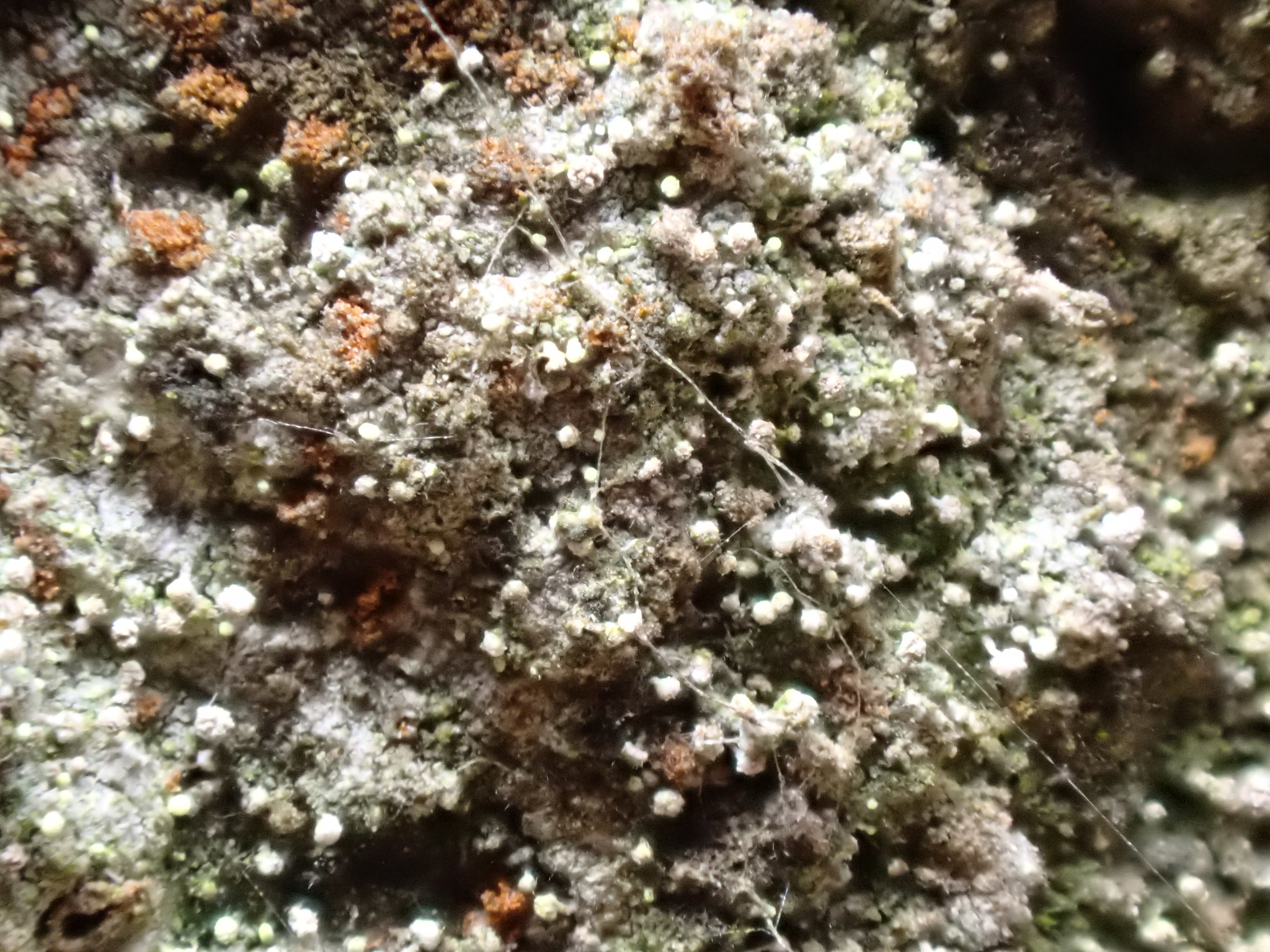
Chaenotheca brachypoda

As of February 2026, Species Fungorum (in the Catalogue of Life) accepts 37 species of Chaenotheca.

- Chaenotheca australis Tibell (1998)
- Chaenotheca biesboschii Tibell & van der Pluijm (2019) – Netherlands
- Chaenotheca brachypoda (Ach.) Tibell (1987)
- Chaenotheca brunneola (Ach.) Müll.Arg. (1862)
- Chaenotheca chlorella (Ach.) Müll.Arg. (1862)
- Chaenotheca chloroxantha Tibell (2001)
- Chaenotheca chrysocephala (Ach.) Th.Fr. (1860)
- Chaenotheca citriocephala (F.Wilson) Tibell (1985)
- Chaenotheca degelii Tibell (1983) – New Zealand
- Chaenotheca deludens Tibell (1987)
- Chaenotheca epidrya (Ach.) Vain. (1927)
- Chaenotheca erkahomattiorum Selva (2013) – North America
- Chaenotheca ferruginea (Turner) Mig. (1930)

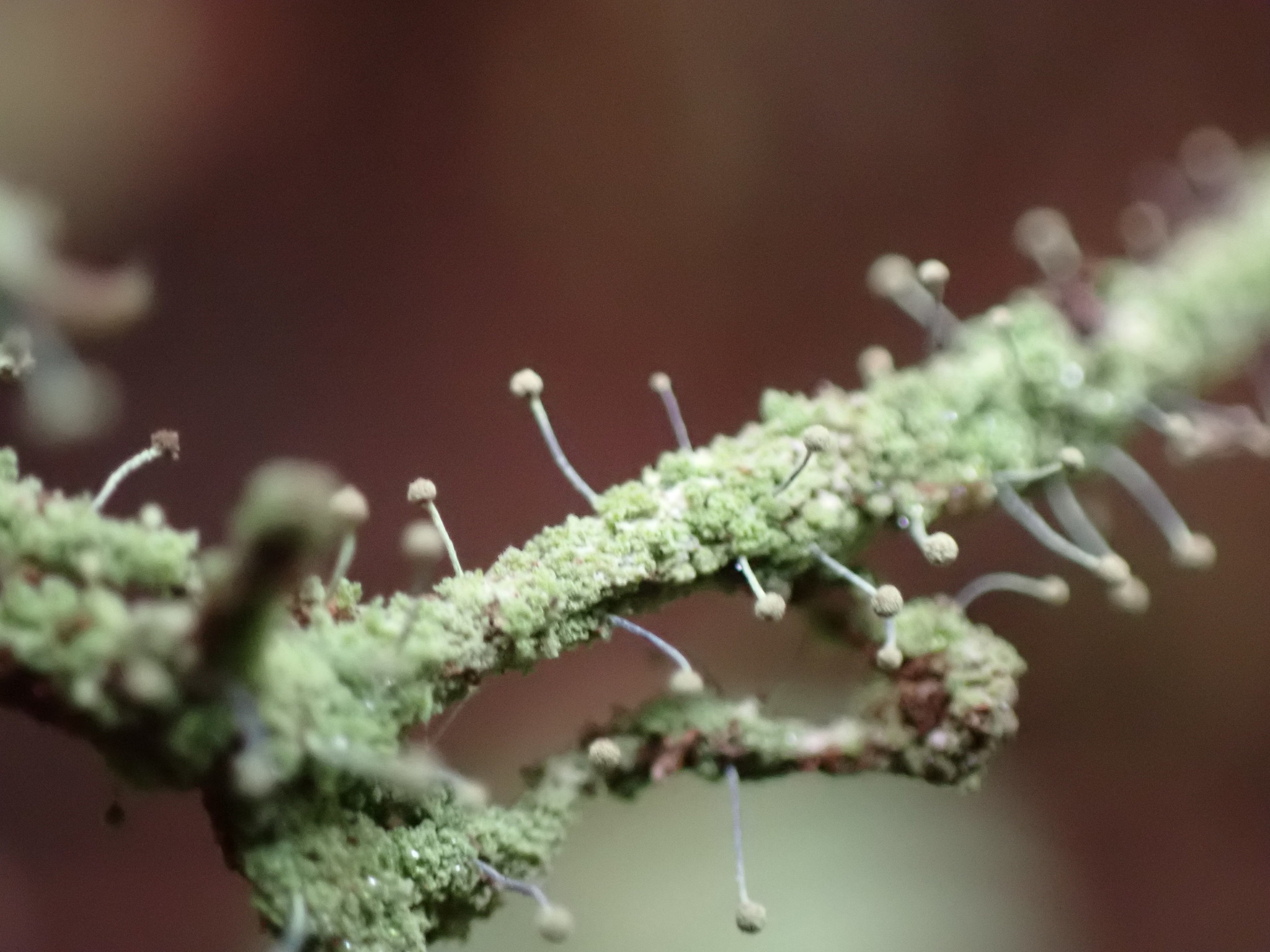
Chaenotheca furfuracea

- Chaenotheca floridana R.C.Harris (1995)
- Chaenotheca furfuracea (L.) Tibell (1984)
- Chaenotheca gracilenta (Ach.) Mattsson & Middelb. (1987)
- Chaenotheca gracillima (Vain.) Tibell (1984)
- Chaenotheca granulosa A.F.W.Schmidt (1974)
- Chaenotheca hispidula (Ach.) Zahlbr. (1922)
- Chaenotheca hygrophila Tibell (1980)
- Chaenotheca laevigata Nádv. (1934)
- Chaenotheca longispora Reese Næsborg & Tibell (2019)
- Chaenotheca nepalensis A.F.W.Schmidt (1974)
- Chaenotheca nitidula Tibell (2002) – northeastern North America
- Chaenotheca papuensis Aptroot & Tibell (2003)
- Chaenotheca phaeocephala (Turner) Th.Fr. (1861)
- Chaenotheca sachalinensis M.Satô (1936)
- Chaenotheca schaereri (De Not.) Zahlbr. (1922)
- Chaenotheca selvae Maloles & McMullin (2018) – Canada
- Chaenotheca servitii Nádv. (1934)
- Chaenotheca sphaerocephala Nádv. (1942)
- Chaenotheca stemonea (Ach.) Müll.Arg. (1862)
- Chaenotheca succina Rikkinen & A.R.Schmidt (2018)
- Chaenotheca trichialis (Ach.) Th.Fr. (1860)
- Chaenotheca xyloxena Nádv. (1934)
