= George Knox Merrill =

American lichenologist (1864–1927)

George Knox Merrill (16 October 1864 –21 October 1927) was an American lichenologist. He was a leading exponent of lichenology in the early 20th century. He was particularly interested in species of the family Cladoniaceae, in which he published several new species, varieties, and forms. In 1909 he started publishing the series Lichenes Exsiccati, which he continued intermittently until 1927; more than 400 specimen items were presented in two exsiccata series.

Merrill was born in Lewiston, Maine, to John Merrill (a farmer) and Jane Prescott. He attended public schools in Lewiston, and later, in Boston where he and his mother moved after his father died. He entered Harvard University but never finished a degree there. Around this time he took up an interest in journalism and started writing articles for the newspaper The Beverly Citizen. Merrill was also a chess player of note, and once won the state championship of Maine.
