= Coniocybe =

Scientific classification
- Kingdom: Fungi
- Division: Ascomycota
- Class: Coniocybomycetes
- Order: Coniocybales
- Family: Coniocybaceae
- Genus: Coniocybe; Acharius, 1816

Genus of fungi

Coniocybe is a genus of fungi belonging to the family Coniocybaceae.

The species of this genus are found in Europe, America, and Australia.

== Species ==
Species:

- Coniocybe atriocephala F.Wilson
- Coniocybe crocata Körb.
- Coniocybe farinosa Boistel
