= Roesleria subterranea =

Scientific classification
- Kingdom: Fungi
- Division: Ascomycota
- Class: Ascomycetes
- Order: incertae sedis
- Family: Roesleriaceae
- Genus: Roesleria
- Species: R. subterranea

Binomial name
- Roesleria subterranea (Weinm.) Redhead, (1985)

Synonyms
- Pilacre subterranea Weinm., (1832)

Species of fungus

Roesleria subterranea is a plant pathogen.
