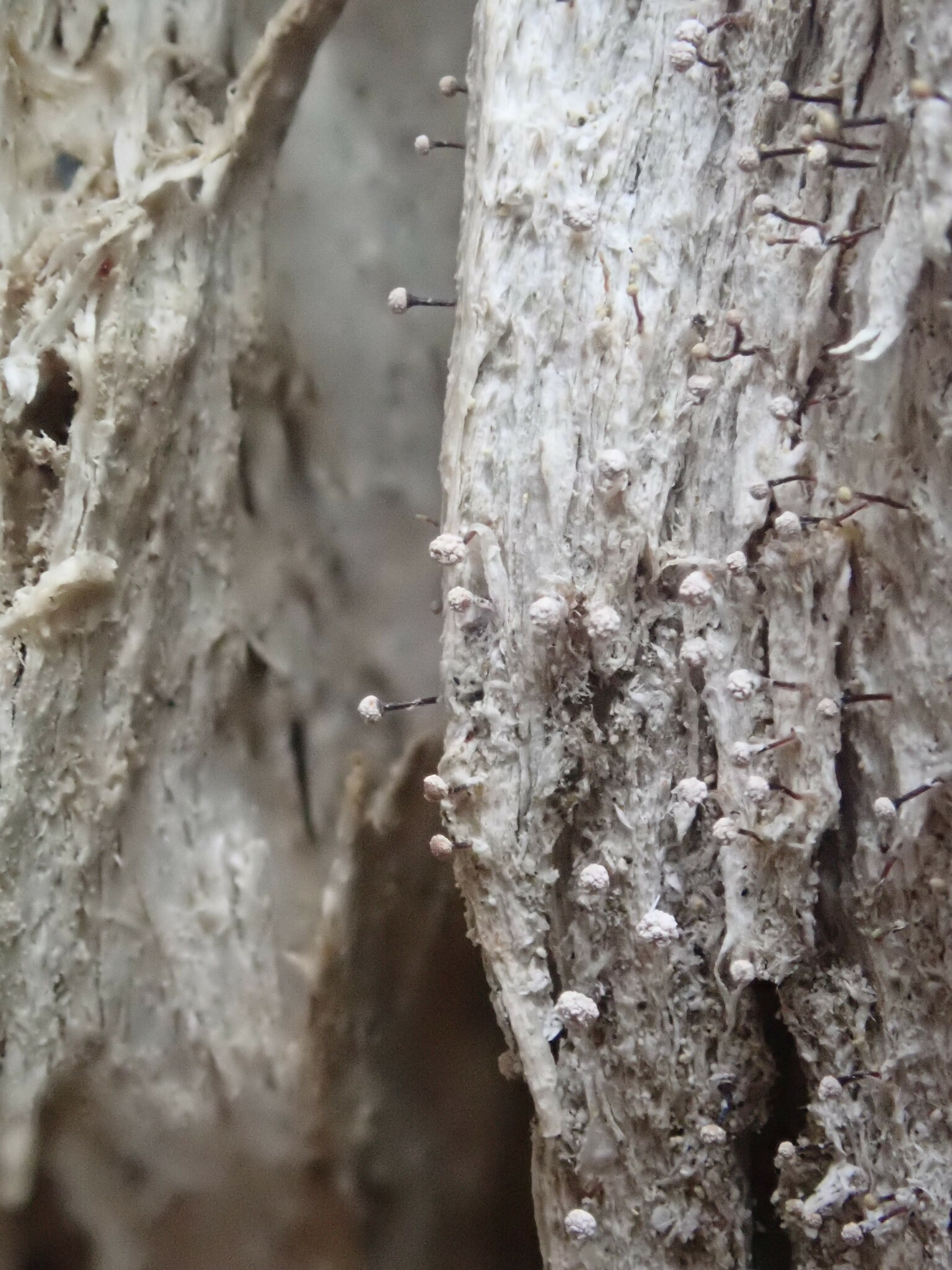
- Sclerophora peronella

Scientific classification
- Domain: Eukaryota
- Kingdom: Fungi
- Division: Ascomycota
- Class: Coniocybomycetes
- Order: Coniocybales
- Family: Coniocybaceae
- Genus: Sclerophora; Chevall. (1826)

Species
- See text

= Sclerophora =

Genus of lichens

Sclerophora is a genus of lichen-forming fungi in the family Coniocybaceae. Largely restricted to temperate latitudes, three of its species have been reported in North America.

== Species ==
As of March 2023, Species Fungorum (in the Catalogue of Life) accepts 4 species of Sclerophora:

- Sclerophora farinacea (Chevall.) Chevall. (1826)
- Sclerophora pallida (Pers.) Y.J.Yao & Spooner (1999)
- Sclerophora peronella (Ach.) Tibell (1984)
- Sclerophora sanguinea (Tibell) Tibell (1984)
