= R. Troy McMullin =

Canadian lichenologist

Richard Troy McMullin
- Education: University of Guelph; Dalhousie University; Queen's University; Trent University; Purdue University
- Scientific career
- Fields: Lichenology
- Workplaces: Canadian Museum of Nature
- Author abbrev. (botany): McMullin

Richard Troy McMullin is a Canadian explorer and lichenologist who works as a research scientist at the Canadian Museum of Nature. He is an adjunct professor at Carleton University and a Fellow of the Royal Canadian Geographical Society. His primary research focus is on advancing the knowledge of the Canadian lichen biota.

McMullin has been featured on several podcasts and YouTube channels including The New York Botanical Garden, the Canadian Museum of Nature, TVOkids, and the Hakai Institute's channels.

== Professional leadership ==
McMullin has been a member of the Lichen Specialist Group for the International Union for Conservation of Nature (IUCN) Species Survival Commission since 2015. He is the former president (2018–2021) and current director and associate newsletter editor of the Field Botanists of Ontario. He has acted as an authority on lichens for COSEWIC and as the Head of Botany at the Canadian Museum of Nature. McMullin has given numerous workshops, including ones on old-growth forest lichens and introductory lichen identification, at the Eagle Hill Institute in coastal Maine. He is an associate editor of the journal Botany (published by Canadian Science Publishing).

McMullin initiated the push for Canada to adopt a national lichen, which was chosen to be Cladonia stellaris in March 2020.

== Bibliography ==
McMullin has authored or co-authored over 200 scientific articles. His book for children, The Secret World of Lichens: A Young Naturalist's Guide, received a positive review in Kirkus Reviews: "Mushrooms may get most of the fungal love, but after poring over high-quality photos of 38 lichens and pausing to absorb McMullin’s densely informative notes on their physical and reproductive structures, distribution, and manifold uses as food, medicine, dyestuffs, and even air pollution monitors, readers will be strongly tempted to divide their affections". Assisted by Lyndsey Sharp he edited and distributed the exsiccata Lichens of Canada Exsiccati.

=== Books ===
- McMullin, R. Troy (August 2023). The Macrolichens of Ontario and the Great Lakes Region of the United States. Firefly. ISBN 978-0-228-10369-1.
- ——— (2022). The Secret World of Lichens: A Young Naturalist's Guide. Firefly. ISBN 978-0-228-10399-8.
- McMullin, Troy; Anderson, Frances, eds. (2014). Common Lichens of Northeastern North America: A Field Guide. Memoirs of the New York Botanical Garden. Bronx, NY: The New York Botanical Garden. ISBN 978-0-89327-511-2.

=== Selected academic publications ===
- Drotos, Katherine H I; Larson, Douglas W; McMullin, R Troy (July 2024). "Scientific Telephone: The Cautionary Tale of the Global Coverage of Lichens". BioScience. 74 (7): 473–477. doi:10.1093/biosci/biae048. ISSN 0006-3568. PMC 11328143. PMID 39156616.
- McMullin, R. Troy; Allen, Jessica L. (April 2022). "An Assessment of Data Accuracy and Best Practice Recommendations for Observations of Lichens and Other Taxonomically Difficult Taxa on iNaturalist". Botany. 100 (6): 491–497. Bibcode:2022Botan.100..491M. doi:10.1139/cjb-2021-0160. ISSN 1916-2790.

== Eponyms ==
At least one lichen species has been named after McMullin:

- Hypotrachyna mcmulliniana Lendemer & J.L. Allen, 2020 (common name: Troy's Square Pants)

== See also ==
- Category:Taxa named by R. Troy McMullin
