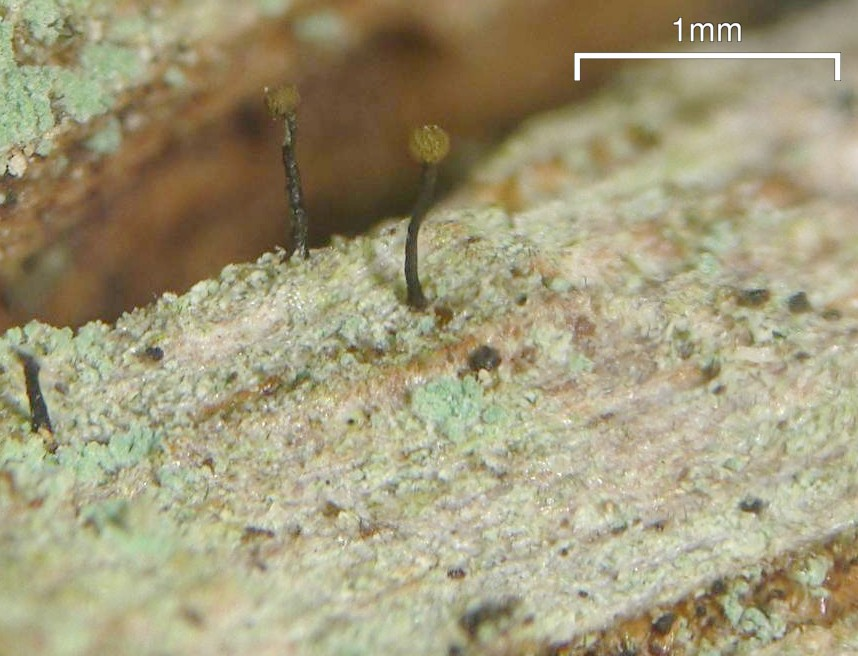
- Chaenotheca brunneola

Scientific classification
- Kingdom: Fungi
- Division: Ascomycota
- Class: Coniocybomycetes; M.Prieto & Wedin (2013)
- Order: Coniocybales; M.Prieto & Wedin (2013)
- Family: Coniocybaceae; Rchb. (1837)

Type genus
- Coniocybe Ach. (1816)

Genera
- Chaenotheca; Chaenotricha; Coniocybe; Sclerophora

= Coniocybaceae =

Family of fungi

The Coniocybaceae are the sole family of lichen-forming fungi in the Coniocybales, which itself is the only order in the class Coniocybomycetes.

== Taxonomy ==
The family was circumscribed by Heinrich Gottlieb Ludwig Reichenbach in 1837. Both the order and the class were proposed by Maria Prieto and Mats Wedin in 2013 after molecular phylogenetics analysis of various calicioid lichens showed that the Coniocybaceae represented an early diverging lineage in the inoperculate ascomycetes.

== Description ==
Coniocybomycetes lichens form symbiotic relationships with various types of green algae, including Dictyochloropsis, Stichococcus, Trentepohlia, and members of the Trebouxioid group. The most distinctive feature of these lichens is their stalked reproductive structures called apothecia. These structures have a spherical to cone-shaped head (capitulum) and contain a powdery mass of spores called a mazaedium, which can range from brown to pale in colour. The apothecia's outer protective layer (excipulum) varies in its development and appears as an extension of the stalk tissue.

The fungi reproduce through spores that develop in specialised cells called asci. These asci are cylindrical, ellipsoidal, or irregularly shaped and break down early in development. They can form either individually or in chains from specialised fungal threads (ascogenous hyphae), sometimes with hook-like structures called croziers. The spores themselves are typically simple and round or elliptical, though some rare species produce cylindrical spores with 1–5 cross-walls (septa). The spore surface can be smooth or decorated with wart-like projections or cracks, and their colour ranges from pale to brown.

Secondary reproductive structures called pycnidia have only been conclusively observed in laboratory cultures of some Chaenotheca species, appearing as simple, Asterophoma-like structures. Simple thread-like reproductive forms (hyphomycetous anamorphs) have been documented both in laboratory cultures and in natural settings.

The order is characterised by the presence of specific chemical compounds, including derivatives of pulvinic and vulpinic acids that appear as a frosting-like coating (pruina) or within the lichen body (thallus). Some species also contain other compounds such as atranorin, baeomycesic acid, squamatic acid, and in one species, pseudoplacodiolic acid.

While genetic studies suggest a relationship with the order Lichinomycetes, there are no known shared physical characteristics (morphological synapomorphies) between these groups.

== Genera ==
- Chaenotheca (Th.Fr.) Th.Fr. (1860) – 28 spp.
- Chaenotricha Suija, McMullin & P.Lõhmus (2023) – 2 spp.
- Coniocybe Ach. (1816) – 4 spp.
- Sclerophora Chevall. (1826) – 4 spp.
