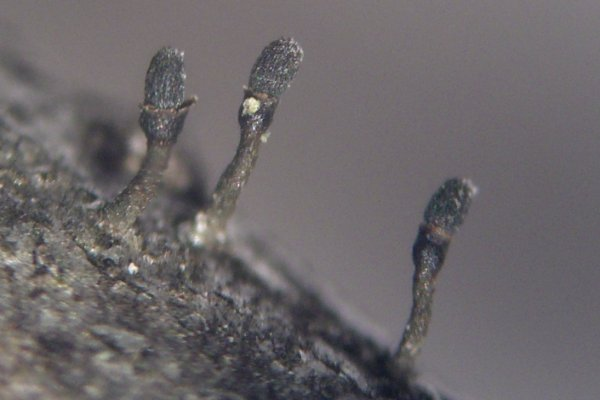

Conservation status
- Vulnerable (NatureServe)

Scientific classification
- Kingdom: Fungi
- Division: Ascomycota
- Class: Lecanoromycetes
- Order: Caliciales
- Family: Caliciaceae
- Genus: Allocalicium; M.Prieto & Wedin (2016)
- Species: A. adaequatum

Binomial name
- Allocalicium adaequatum (Nyl.) M.Prieto & Wedin (2016)

Synonyms
- Calicium adaequatum Nyl. (1869); Embolidium adaequatum (Nyl.) Vain. (1927); Embolidium adaequatum var. umbrinella Räsänen (1939); Calicium hemisphaericum G.E.Howard (1955)

= Allocalicium =

Single-species lichen genus

Allocalicium is a single-species fungal genus in the family Caliciaceae. It is monotypic, containing the single pin lichen species Allocalicium adaequatum. This lichen occurs in North America, South America, Europe, and the Russian Far East, where it grows on branches and twigs of deciduous trees and shrubs, typically those of alder and poplar. The species was originally described in 1869 as a member of Calicium, but molecular phylogenetics analysis demonstrated it was not a member of that genus and so Allocalicium was created to contain it.

Allocalicium is characterised by a thallus that grows predominantly under the surface of its bark substrate, though variations exist. Its characteristic structures include olive-brown stalked ascomata, dark brown apothecia (fruiting bodies) measuring 0.4–0.7 mm, and spores with unique spiral ridges formed by the uneven rupture of the outer spore wall. The photobiont partner of the lichen is from the green algal genus Trebouxia.

== Taxonomy ==
Allocalicium was circumscribed in 2016 by lichenologists Maria Prieto and Mats Wedin, to contain the single species Allocalicium adaequatum. This lichen was originally called Calicium adaequatum when it was first described by William Nylander in 1869. He wrote Ad corticem alni in Lapponia meridionali, Turtola, socium Calicii byssacei Fr., legit J. P. Norrlin (1867) ('On the bark of alder in Southern Lapland, Turtola, associated with Calicium byssaceum Fr., collected by J. P. Norrlin (1867).') In 1927, Edvard Vainio suggested that the species should instead be classified in the genus Embolidium. This genus has since been folded into synonymy with Calicium, and so Vainio's Embolidium adaequatum, as well as the variety subsequently proposed by Veli Räsänen in 1939, E. adaequatum var. umbrinella, are now considered synonyms of Allocalicium adaequatum. The species Calicium hemisphaericum, described as new in 1955 by Grace E. Howard from specimens collected in Washington state, was placed into synonymy with A. adequatum in 1975 by the pin lichen specialist Leif Tibell.

In an analysis of the systematics of the Caliciaceae using molecular phylogenetics, Prieto and Wedin discovered that the lichen was one of several Calicium species that did not group with other members of the genus. The generic name Allocalicium combines the Greek prefix allo ("strange") with the name of its former genus. One vernacular name used in North America is "shrub stubble".

Allocalicium is closely related to Tholurna, and both have quite similar spore ornamentation and capitulum morphology. The relatedness of the two genera had been mentioned in 2003 by Tibell, who suggested that the genus Calicium, as it was then circumscribed, was polyphyletic. Using molecular phylogenetics analysis, he showed that it formed a strongly supported clade with Tholurna dissimilis. This close phylogenetic relationship between the two taxa was unexpected, as Tholurna is fruticose (shrubby) and Calicium is crustose.

== Description ==
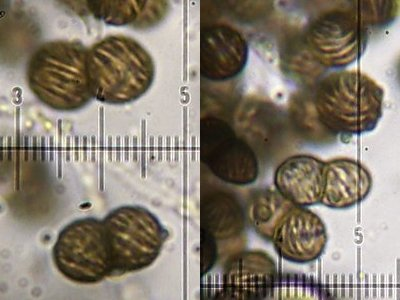
Spirally ornamented spores of Allocalicium

Allocalicium typically has a thallus that is immersed in its substrate (endosubstratal), although some specimens have been recorded as having thalli with warty to almost squamulose (scaly), greenish-grey areoles. It has a pale grey to olive brown stalk that is 8–10 times as high as its diameter. Its ascomata have olive-brown stalks that form small clumps. The apothecia (fruiting bodies) are dark brown, and measure 0.4–0.7 mm in diameter. The capitulum (the expanded, upper part of the stalk) is bell-shaped and dark. The excipulum (the base upon which rests the hymenium) is 20–35 μm thick, and brown on its outermost parts. Spores have a single septum, and measure 11 by 4.5–5.5 μm. The spores have a surface ornamentation consisting of spirally arranged ridges. This ornamentation is created through the uneven breaking of the spore wall's outermost layer.

In a study of pin lichen (i.e., calicioid lichen) species of western Oregon, Jouko Rikkinen proposed that the variations he observed in Allocalicium adaequatum specimens, with some displaying smaller ascomata and shorter spores and others having more robust ascomata with larger spores, suggest potential differences not explained by spore age alone. The smaller form was found to predominate in lowland hardwoods, particularly on older Quercus twigs, while the larger form was mainly found in montane forests on various deciduous trees and smooth-barked Abies species.

The photobiont of Allocalicium is a member of the green algal genus Trebouxia. No secondary metabolites (lichen products) have been detected in this species.

The appearance of Phaeocalicium polyporaeum is reminiscent of Allocalicium adaequatum due to its small stature, dark head, and lighter olive-brown stems. This similar species can be distinguished by its uniquely obconically shaped head and its substrate preference: the fruiting bodies of polypore fungi.

== Habitat and distribution ==
Allocalicium adaequatum grows on thin branches and twigs of the species Alnus incana, Populus, and Salix. Specimens collected from Switzerland, in contrast, have all been recorded on sycamore. It prefers locales with high humidity, and is often found along streams in well-lit areas of swamps. On the West Coast of northern North America, the distribution of the lichen extends as far north as Alaska. It was reported as new to eastern North America in 2013 when it was collected in New Brunswick. It has also been recorded in South America, Europe (including Finland, Germany, Switzerland, and Ukraine) and the Russian Far East. It is on the Swedish red list of threatened species. In Asia, it has been reported to occur in Thailand.

In a study conducted in the Wells Gray Provincial Park, located in east-central British Columbia, Canada, Allocalicium adaequatum has been observed exclusively in forest stands that are older than approximately 300 years. Despite its association with old stands, the lichen has also been found on the young branches of shrubs, specifically alder (Alnus), which are more typically found in mid-seral stands, indicating a broader ecological range than previously characterised. A previous study conducted in Northern Europe similarly concluded that A. adaequatum could be used as a reliable indicator species of forest continuity.
