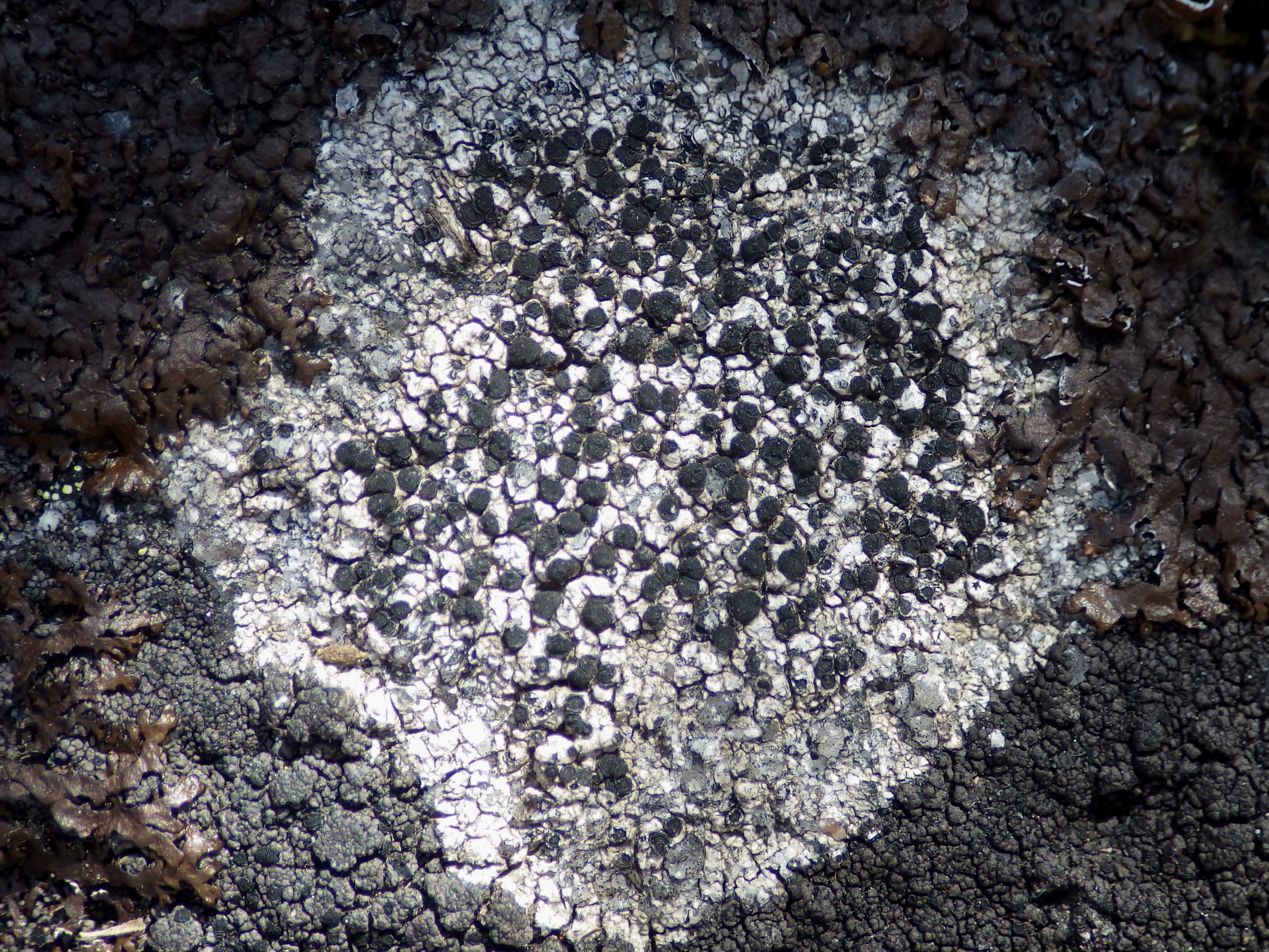

Conservation status
- Vulnerable (NatureServe)

Scientific classification
- Kingdom: Fungi
- Division: Ascomycota
- Class: Lecanoromycetes
- Order: Caliciales
- Family: Caliciaceae
- Genus: Buellia
- Species: B. aethalea

Binomial name
- Buellia aethalea (Ach.) Th.Fr.

Synonyms
- Buellia aethalea f. aethaleoides (Nyl.) Grummann; Buellia aethalea f. baltica (Erichsen) Grummann; Buellia aethalea f. sororioides (Erichsen) Grummann; Buellia aethalea subsp. aethaleoides (Nyl.) Grummann, 1958; Buellia aethalea subsp. baltica (Erichsen) Grummann, 1957; Buellia aethalea subsp. sororioides (Erichsen) Grummann, 1957; Buellia aethaleoides (Nyl.) H.Olivier; Buellia atroalba var. aethaleoides (Nyl.) Boistel; Buellia atroalbella var. aethalea (Ach.) Mong.; Buellia atropallidula (Nyl.) J.Lahm, 1883; Buellia baltica Erichsen; Buellia hillmannii Erichsen; Buellia impressula (Leight.) A.L.Sm.; Buellia ocellata var. tenella Müll.Arg., 1875; Buellia soraria Th.Fr.; Buellia sororia Th.Fr.; Buellia sororia subsp. sororioides (Erichsen) Riehm., 1935; Buellia sororia var. sororioides (Erichsen) Riehm.; Buellia sororioides Erichsen; Buellia sororioides f. dendritica Erichsen, 1930; Buellia subatra Erichsen; Buellia subatrata Erichsen; Caloplaca umbrinofusca (Nyl.) H.Olivier; Gyalecta aethalea Ach.; Lecanora atropallidula Nyl.; Lecanora immersata Nyl., 1878; Lecanora umbrinofusca Nyl.; Lecidea aethalea (Ach.) Nyl.; Lecidea aethalea (Ach.) Stiz.; Lecidea aethaleoides Nyl.; Lecidea atroalbella var. aethalea (Ach.) Nyl.; Lecidea impressula Leight.; Lecidea sororia (Th.Fr.) Stizenb.; Lecidea verruculosa Borrer; Lichen opegraphus subsp. aethalea (Ach.) Lam.; Lichen verruculosus Borrer; Melanaspicilia aethalea (Ach.) Vain.; Rinodina atropallidula (Nyl.) Arnold; Rinodina immersata (Körb.) Zahlbr.; Rinodina ocellulata Bagl. & Carestia; Rinodina umbrinofusca (Nyl.) H.Olivier

= Buellia aethalea =

Species of fungus

Buellia aethalea is a species of lichen that belongs to the family Caliciaceae. It is commonly known as darkened button lichen, and Buellie noircie in French. The lichen's familiar nickname is inspired by the appearance of its surface, adorned with small black spots reminiscent of buttons.

== Description ==
The thallus of this crustose lichen has a distinctive areolate structure, with the individual areoles varying considerably in their appearance. They typically range from 0.2–0.6(−1.2) mm in diameter, displaying an angular, irregular shape. The areoles can exhibit a pale to dark grey coloration, sometimes taking on a brownish tint that gives the thallus a discolored look. Separating the areoles is a narrow, black prothallus that helps delineate the edges of the thallus.

Examining the thallus microscopically reveals a white medulla that lacks any deposits of calcium oxalate.

Reproductive structures on this lichen are represented by its lecideine apothecia, which remain immersed within the thallus rather than developing a raised, sessile appearance. These apothecia are relatively small, measuring (0.1–)0.2–0.2(−0.5) mm in diameter. The apothecial margin is black, but indistinct and reduced, while the disc itself is flat and black, lacking any sort of pruina or surface bloom.

The excipular anatomy of the apothecia is rather narrow and poorly differentiated. The inner hyphae are hyaline and prosoplectenchymatous, often resembling the orientation and appearance of the paraphyses. In contrast, the outer excipular hyphae are parallel, moderately swollen, and heavily pigmented in various shades of brown and greenish blue. This pigmentation of the outer exciple also extends into the brown epihymenium.

The hymenium itself is hyaline and lacks any conspicuous oil droplets. The paraphyses exhibit a simple to moderately branched morphology, with their apical portions swollen and capped in a brown pigment.

Turning to the asci, they are clavate in shape and contain 8 ascospores each. Those ascospores start out as a blue-green color but eventually mature into a dark brown hue. They are 1-septate, broadly ellipsoid in shape, and become constricted with age, measuring (11–)11.6–[12.8]–14.1(−17) x (5–)7.2–[8.1]–8.9(−10) μm.

Pycnidia are quite rare on this lichen. When present, they take on a urceolate to globose, unilocular structure, with conidiogenous cells that are primarily terminal (apical), though occasionally also intercalary (among or between sub-apical cells). The conidia produced within these pycnidia are bacilliform, measuring 5–5.5 x 1 μm.

== Chemistry ==
Spot tests reveal that the thallus and medulla are K+ yellow to red (indicating the presence of crystals), P+ yellow, and C−, KC−, CK−. The thallus does not fluoresce under UV light, and the medulla is non-amyloid. The secondary metabolites present in B. aethalea are norstictic and connorstictic acids.

This lichen species is epilithic, growing on a variety of siliceous (HCl-) rock substrates.

== Distribution and ecology ==
Buellia aethalea is widely distributed across temperate regions, with the species being commonly encountered in northern Europe. However, reports of its occurrence in North America are considerably scarcer.

Within the Sonoran Desert region of North America, the lichen has been documented growing at higher elevations in the state of Arizona. Specific locations where B. aethalea has been observed include the San Francisco Peaks and the White Mountains.

Ecologically, Buellia aethalea functions as an epilithic lichen, colonizing a variety of siliceous, or acid-based, rock substrates.

== Conservation status ==
=== Worldwide ===
According to NatureServe conservation status, Buellia aethalea has a global conservation status of G3 (rounded), indicating it is vulnerable.

=== National ===
In Canada, it is ranked as N3N5, with subnational ranks of S3S5 in British Columbia and SNR (unranked) in other provinces. In the United States, it is unranked nationally and, in several states.
