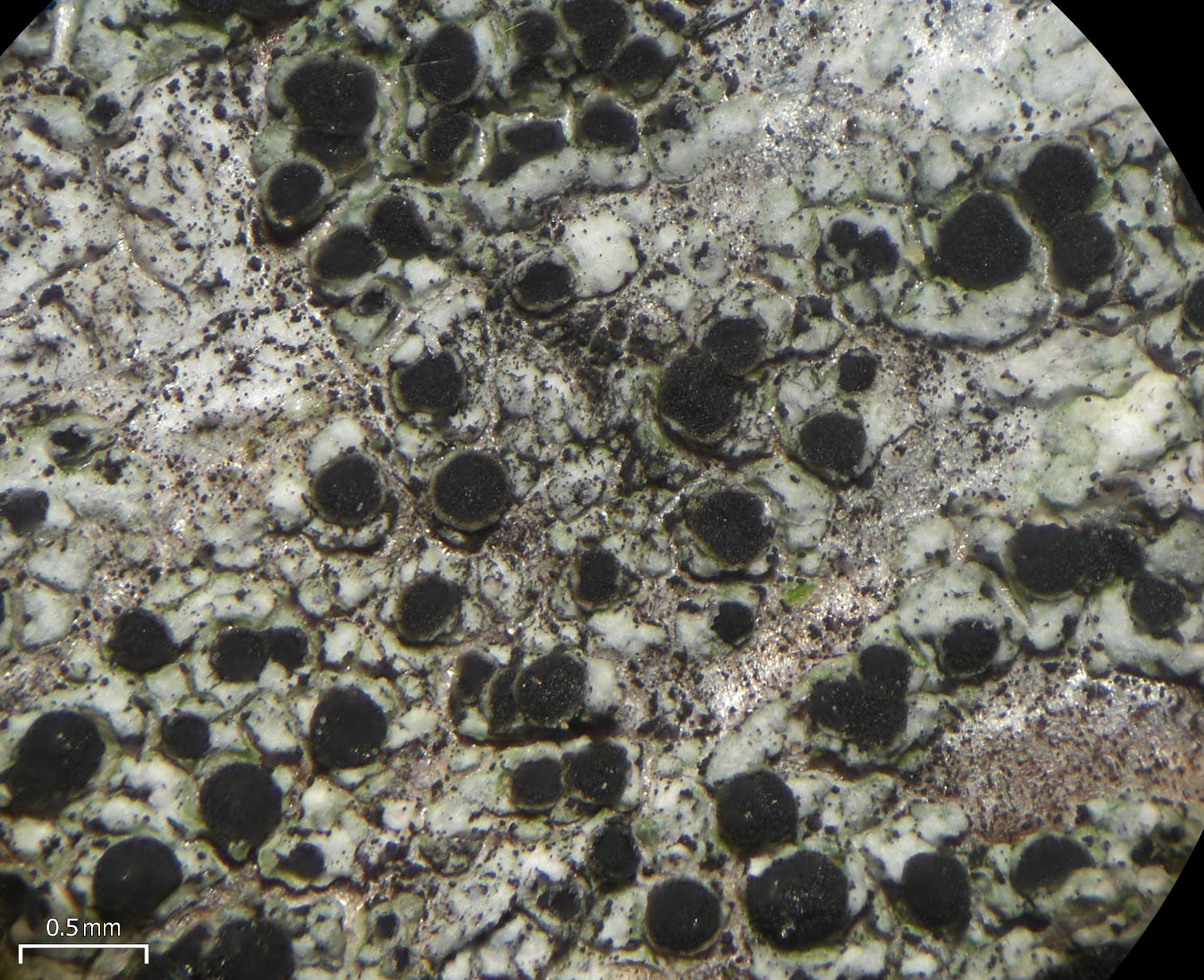

Scientific classification
- Domain: Eukaryota
- Kingdom: Fungi
- Division: Ascomycota
- Class: Lecanoromycetes
- Order: Caliciales
- Family: Caliciaceae
- Genus: Amandinea
- Species: A. milliaria

Binomial name
- Amandinea milliaria (Tuck.) P.F.May & Sheard (1997)

Synonyms
- Rinodina milliaria Tuck. (1877)

= Amandinea milliaria =

Species of lichen in the family Caliciaceae

Amandinea milliaria is a species of corticolous lichen in the family Caliciaceae. It was originally described as a species of Rinodina by Edward Tuckerman in 1877. Philip F. May and John Wilson Sheard transferred it to Amandinea in 1997. The lichen is found in the east coast of North America, ranging from Prince Edward Island south to Texas, and includes the Great Lakes region.
