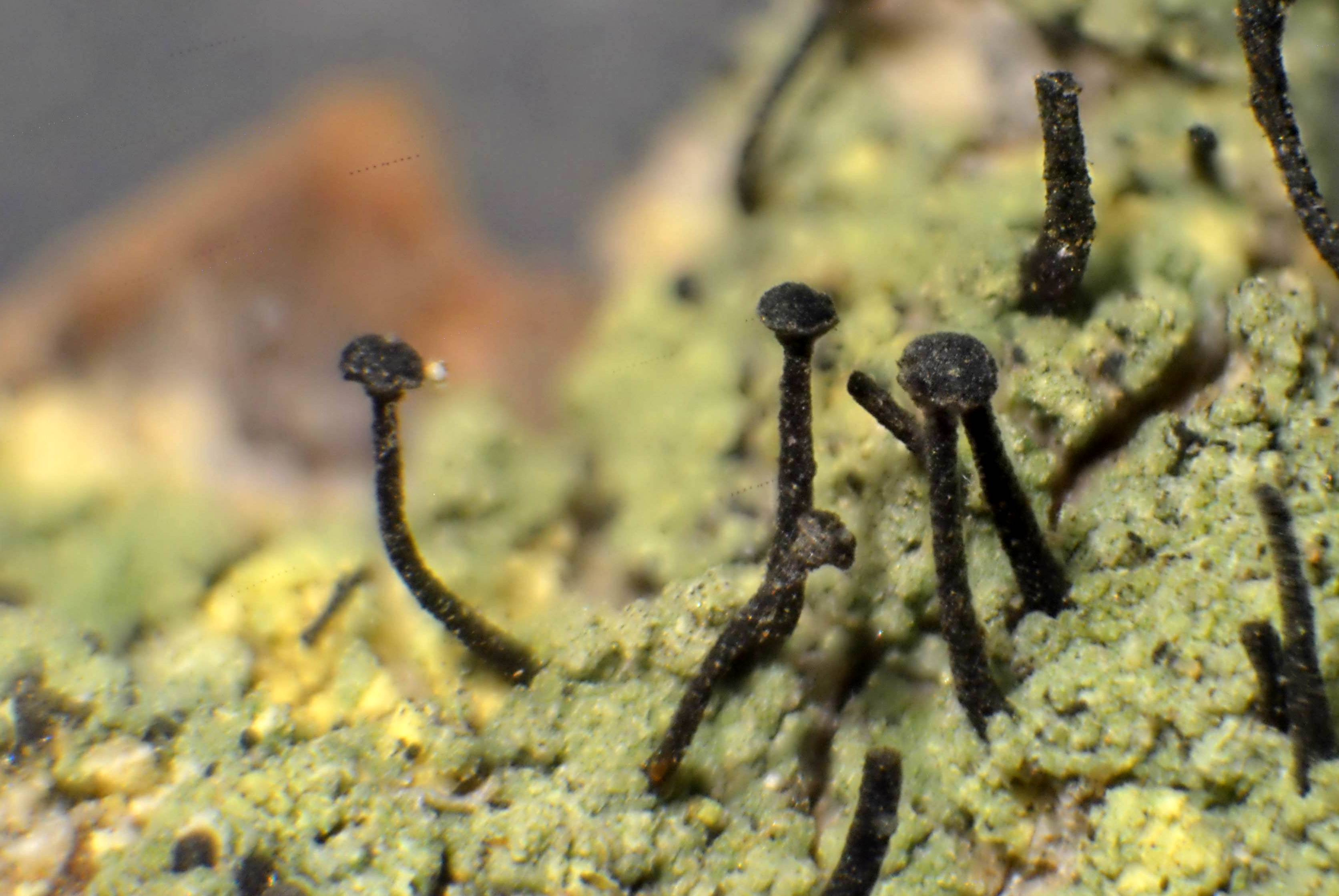
- Calicium viride

Scientific classification
- Kingdom: Fungi
- Division: Ascomycota
- Class: Lecanoromycetes
- Order: Caliciales
- Family: Caliciaceae; Chevall. (1826)

Type genus
- Calicium Pers. (1794)

Synonyms
- Buelliaceae Zahlbr. (1908); Pyxinaceae J.W.Griff. & Henfr. (1859)

= Caliciaceae =

Family of lichen-forming fungi

The Caliciaceae are a family of mostly lichen-forming fungi belonging to the class Lecanoromycetes in the division Ascomycota. Although the family has had its classification changed several times throughout its taxonomic history, the use of modern molecular phylogenetic methods has helped to establish its current placement in the order Caliciales. Caliciaceae contains 39 genera and about 670 species. The largest genus is Buellia, with around 300 species; there are more than a dozen genera that contain only a single species.

Most Caliciaceae grow on bark, dead wood, or rocks. Some members of this family, particularly those of the type genus, Calicium, are characterized by the presence of thin-walled and short-lasting asci (spore-bearing cells) and a mazaedium, which is an accumulation of loose, maturing spores covering the surface of the fruiting body. The resulting passive spore dispersal is relatively rare amongst the Ascomycota. The mazaedium, usually black, either sits atop a long thin stalk, or rests on (or is sometimes immersed within) the surface of the lichen substrate. Many other Caliciaceae species generate spores in an apothecium, which typically resembles a flattened black disc.

The family contains species with crustose (crusty), foliose (leafy), and, in a few instances, fruticose (shrubby) growth forms. The photobiont partner of Caliciaceae lichens is usually from the green algal genus Trebouxia. Collectively, the family has a cosmopolitan distribution, and can be found on all major land masses. Although the family is best represented in mountainous areas of temperate and tropical regions, a few hardy species can survive the harsh environment offered by Antarctica's McMurdo Dry Valleys by growing in cracks on the surface of rocks. Five Caliciaceae species are included in the International Union for Conservation of Nature's Red List of Threatened Species. Some air pollution-resistant species in the genus Pyxine have been investigated for use as biomonitors of heavy metal pollution. Several fossils of Caliciaceae found as inclusions in amber have been used to evaluate the evolutionary history of the family.

== Systematics ==
Caliciaceae was circumscribed in 1826 by the French botanist François Fulgis Chevallier. He wrote about the family: "The Calicinees are a small group of plants, the growth of which has misled botanists. They are small parasitic fungi on the crusts of lichens, mainly on Variola and common porin, and on dead canes." The type genus of the Caliciaceae is Calicium, originally circumscribed in 1794 by Christiaan Hendrik Persoon; this genus is itself typified by Calicium viride. Buelliaceae and Pyxinaceae are historical families created to contain taxa that are now included in the Caliciaceae.

Two other calicioid families with "Caliciaceae" in their name – Microcaliciaceae (order Pertusariales, class Lecanoromycetes) and Mycocaliciaceae (order Mycocaliciales, class Eurotiomycetes) – contain species formerly considered to be closely related to the Caliciaceae. The monogeneric Microcaliciaceae has non-lichenized, calicioid species that are parasites on lichens or free-living colonies of algae, while Mycocaliciaceae contains non-lichenized calicioid fungi lacking a mazaedium and utilising active spore dispersal.

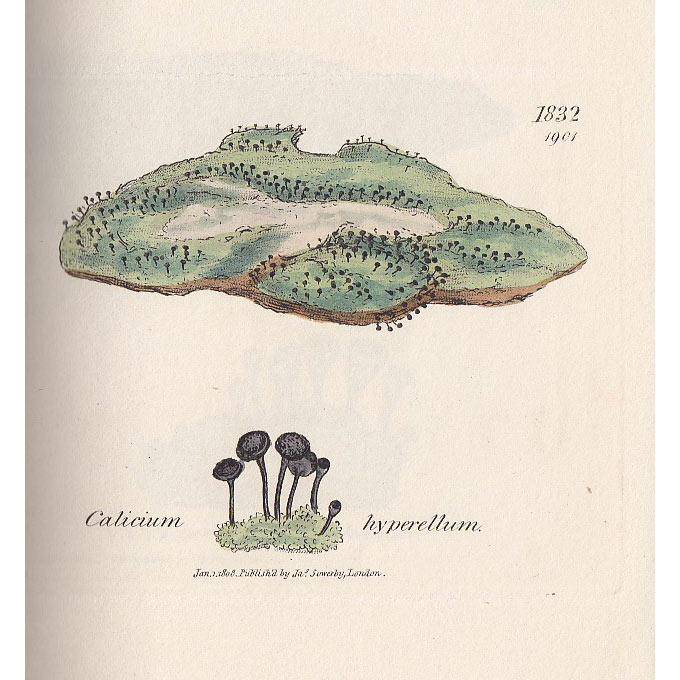
The lichen Calicium viride (then called Calicium hyperellum) as it appeared in Smith and Sowerby's English Botany, Vol. 10 (1843).

=== Classification ===
The Caliciaceae and other morphologically similar pin lichens with mazaedium-forming ascomata featuring passive spore dispersal used to be grouped together in the order Caliciales, which was for a long time considered to be a model example of a monophyletic grouping of taxa. Historically, the family has also been placed by various authors in the orders Coryneliales, Helotiales, and the now-obsolete Sphaeriales, depending on which phenotypic characteristics were considered to be the most important.

The Swedish lichenologist Leif Tibell spent much of his career studying calicioid lichens, and used a variety of techniques to help him understand relationships of taxa in this group, including phenetic and cladistic analyses of morphology, and investigation of secondary chemistry. He suggested in 1984 that the order was polyphyletic (i.e., it did not originate from a single common ancestor) and that the main identifying features of the Caliciales had evolved independently in several different unrelated groups. He restricted the order to three families (Caliciaceae, Mycocaliciaceae, and Sphinctrinaceae) that he considered to be the "core" of the group. Preliminary phylogenetic analysis showed that Mycocaliciaceae and Sphinctrinaceae belonged to the class Eurotiomycetes, while Caliciaceae appeared to group with the order Lecanorales. The proposition that mazaediate fungi are dispersed throughout the Ascomycota was confirmed later in several molecular phylogenetic studies. The six genera that were included by Tibell in the Caliciaceae in his 1984 proposed classification of calicioid fungi (Acroscyphus, Calicium, Cyphelium, Texosporium, Thelomma, and Tholurna) are still in the family today.

=== Phylogenetics ===
The Caliciaceae and the Physciaceae were shown to be closely related in molecular studies. Both of these families were tentatively placed in the Teloschistales as part of the suborder Physciineae. Since the mazaedia-producing species of the Caliciaceae were nested within the genera Dirinaria, Pyxine, and Physcia (all once contained in the family Physciaceae), some authors treated all the members of the Caliciaceae and Physciaceae as one family, and the name Physciaceae was proposed for conservation in 2002. With the appearance of additional phylogenetic studies since then, however, a two-family concept of Caliciaceae and Physciaceae has been preferred by most authorities. In 2012, the suborder Physciineae was promoted to ordinal status and the name Caliciales was resurrected. In its modern circumscription, the order Caliciales contains these two families. A large molecular study of the Caliciaceae-Physciaceae clade published in 2016 has helped to sort out natural relationships in this group, and more clearly define generic delimitations.

The genus Culbersonia, previously classified in the Physiaceae because of its morphological resemblance to Physconia, was shown to be a member of the Caliciaceae in 2019. In phylogenetic analysis, it groups together in a clade with Pyxine and Dirinaria. These three genera are distinguished from other Caliciaceae in the appressed foliose growth form (like small leaves pressed flat against the substrate), the absence of a mazaedium, and ecologically by their predominance in the subtropics and tropics.

== Description ==
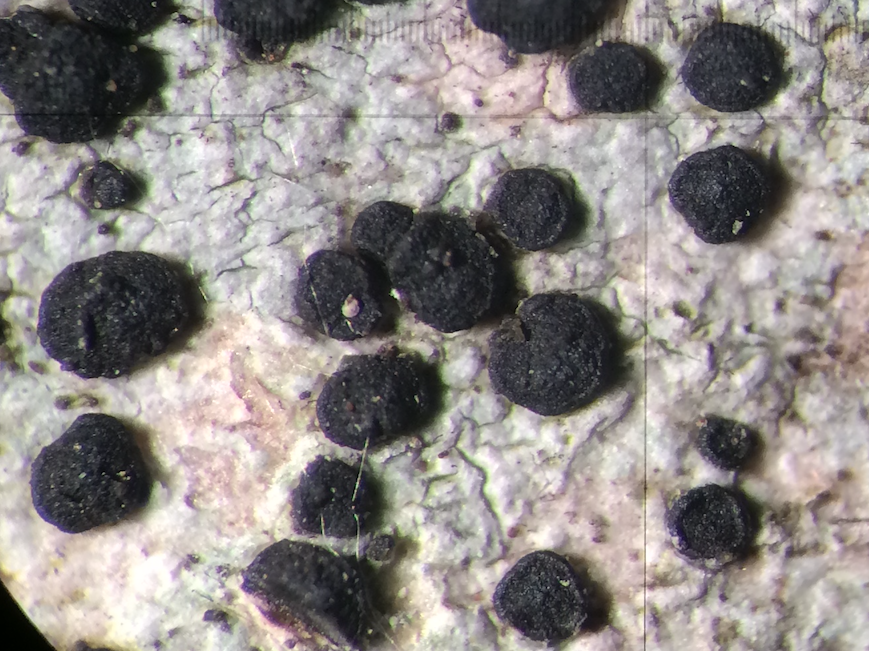
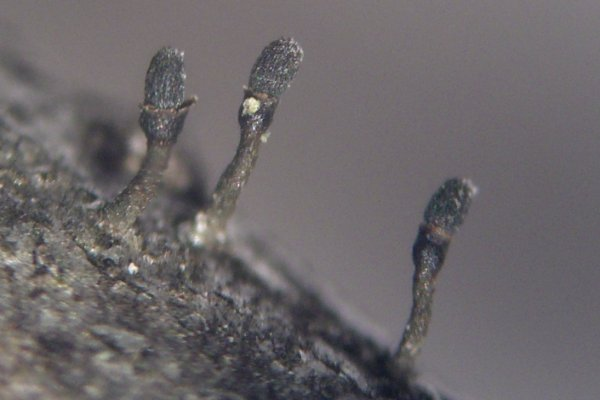
The lecidiene ascomata of the boreal button lichen (Buellia disciformis, left) are carbonized, discoid, and sessile. The mazaediate ascomata of the shrub stubble lichen (Allocalicium adaequatum, right) rest atop short, black stalks.

The thallus, when present, is crustose, with a texture that is verrucose (warty), granular (grainy), or areolate. Its colour is typically grey, yellow, or greenish. Sometimes it is immersed within the outer layers of the bark of its host. The ascomata are more or less spherical or hemispherical, situated atop a long stalk in some species, but sessile in other species. When it is present, the stalk is usually melanized (blackened). The form of the ascomata is either apotheciate (consisting of an apothecium) or mazaediate. The apothecium consists of the asci (spore-bearing cells) and associated hymenium, and the sterile, structural, and supportive part of the apothecium, called the excipulum. In apotheciate Caliciaceae species, the apothecium is typically lecidiene (lacking a margin around the thallus, or having a margin made of the excipulum itself), rather than lecanorine (rounded with a protruding margin). The tissue structure of the excipulum is either prosoplectenchymatous (comprising long, narrow, wavy, parallel hyphae) or paraplectenchymatous (a cell arrangement where the hyphae are oriented in all directions), and is hyaline (translucent) to dark brown. The genus Acroscyphus, which contains the single widespread but rare species A. sphaerophoroides, is a peculiar exception to the typical morphology of the Caliciaceae: it has a finger-like (dactyliform) thallus, immersed ascocarps on podetia (hollow stalks), and a yellow to orange medulla.

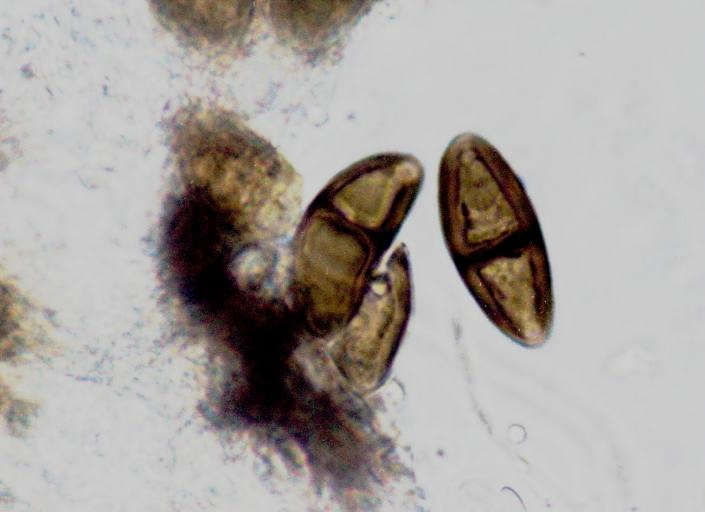
Photograph of brown, 1-septate (2-celled) spores from Buellia disciformis taken through a compound microscope at 1000X magnification. The spores measure about 27 x 11 μm.

The asci of Caliciaceae species are cylindrical to broadly club-shaped. They are attached to croziers, which are hook-shaped structures on cells that form at the base of the asci. The asci have thin walls and lack any internal structures at the tip. As a result, they last for only a short time before they degrade, and the ascospores within are released passively in a mazaedial mass. The hamathecium (a term that refers to the tissues interspersed between the asci in the hymenium) consists of unbranched to slightly branched paraphyses that are amyloid. There are usually eight spores per ascus, although sometimes this is reduced to four, or increased to 16–32 per ascus. The ascospores are dark brown, with a surface that is either smooth or ornamented with remnants from the rupture of the outer wall layers. They have either zero or one septa. The spores of Texosporium lichens have a unique ornamentation that is created by paraphyses that stick to the surface; this feature may help provide protection against desiccation or DNA-damaging radiation encountered when exposed in sunny habitats. The conidiomata produced by Caliciaceae species are in the form of pycnidia. The conidia lack a septum, are rod-shaped (bacillar) to thread-shaped (filiform) in form (often curved), and are hyaline.

The secondary chemistry of Caliciaceae species is variable. Chemicals that are commonly reported from the family are depsides (including atranorin), terpenes, depsidones (e.g., norstictic acid), and lichexanthone. Sometimes anthraquinones are present when the thallus is pigmented. Acroscyphus is again an exception, as it contains secondary compounds not found in other Caliciaceae, including chloroatranorin, rugulosin, zeorin, and chrysophanic acid.

== Genera ==
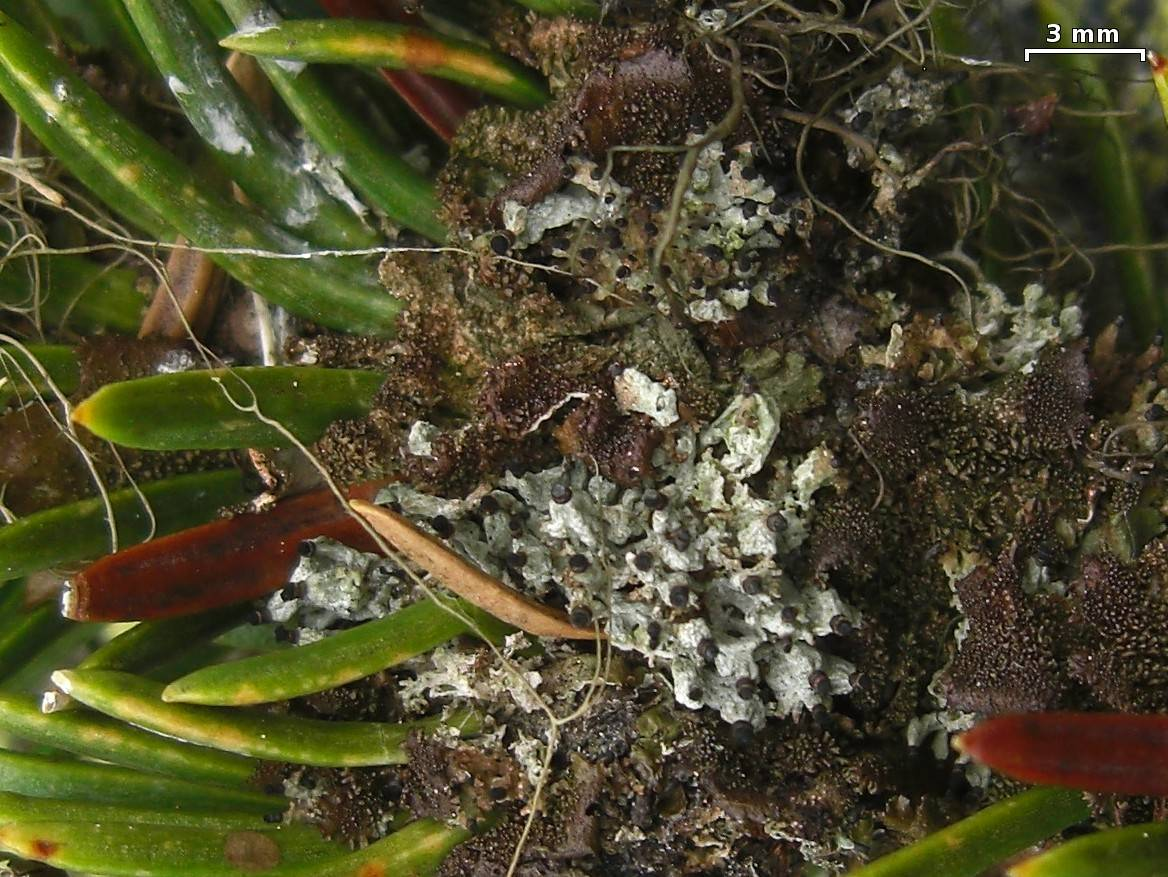
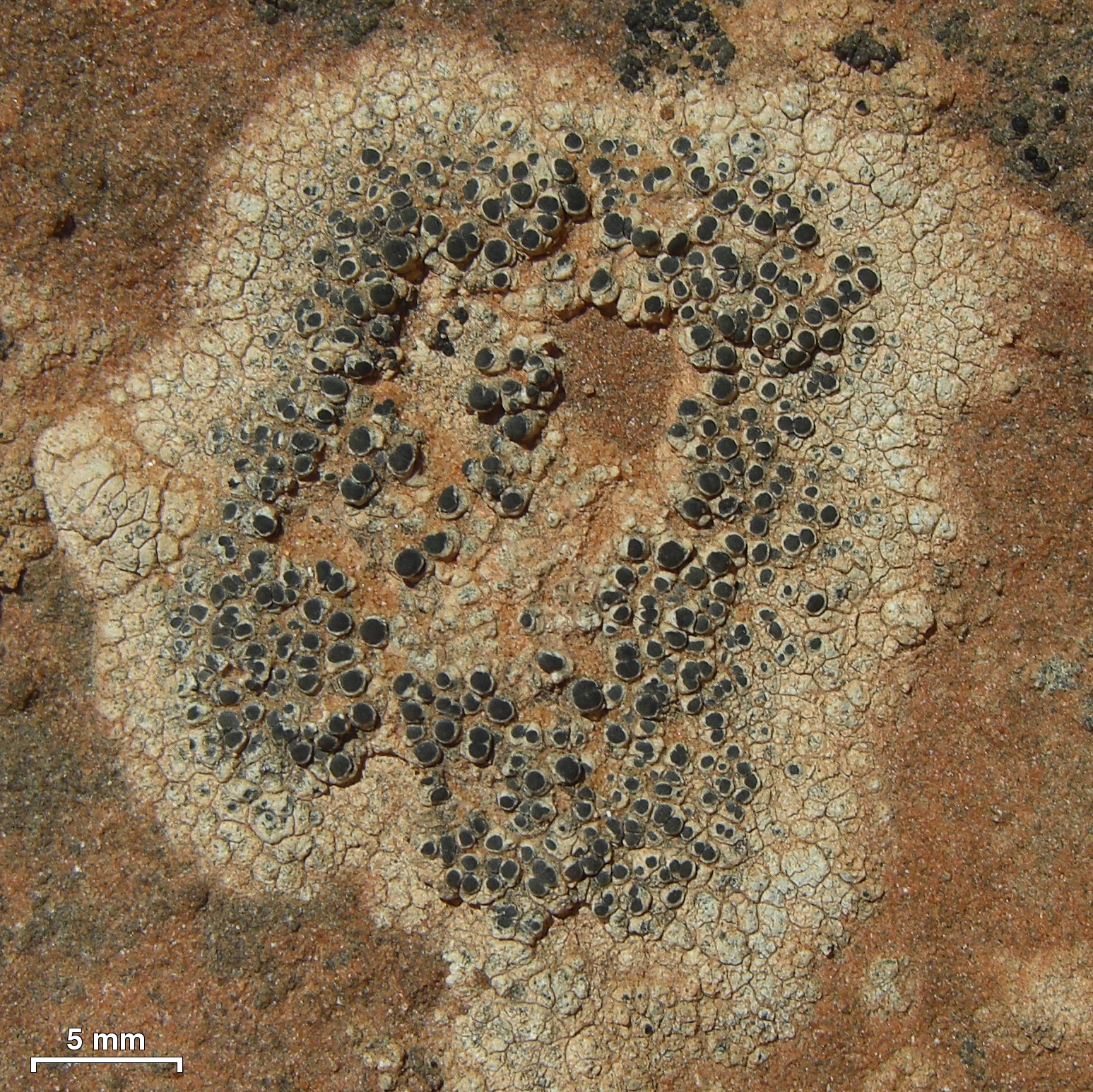
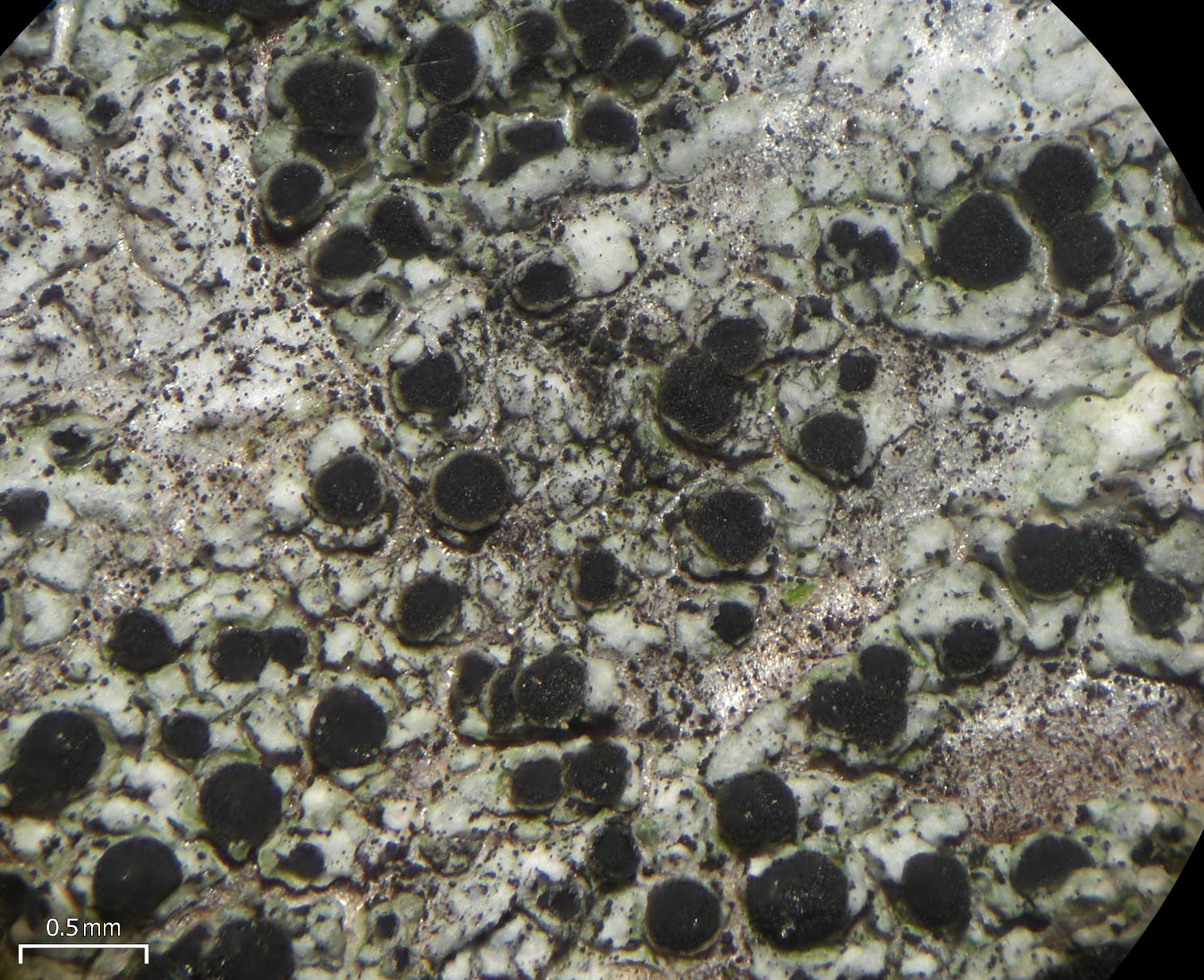
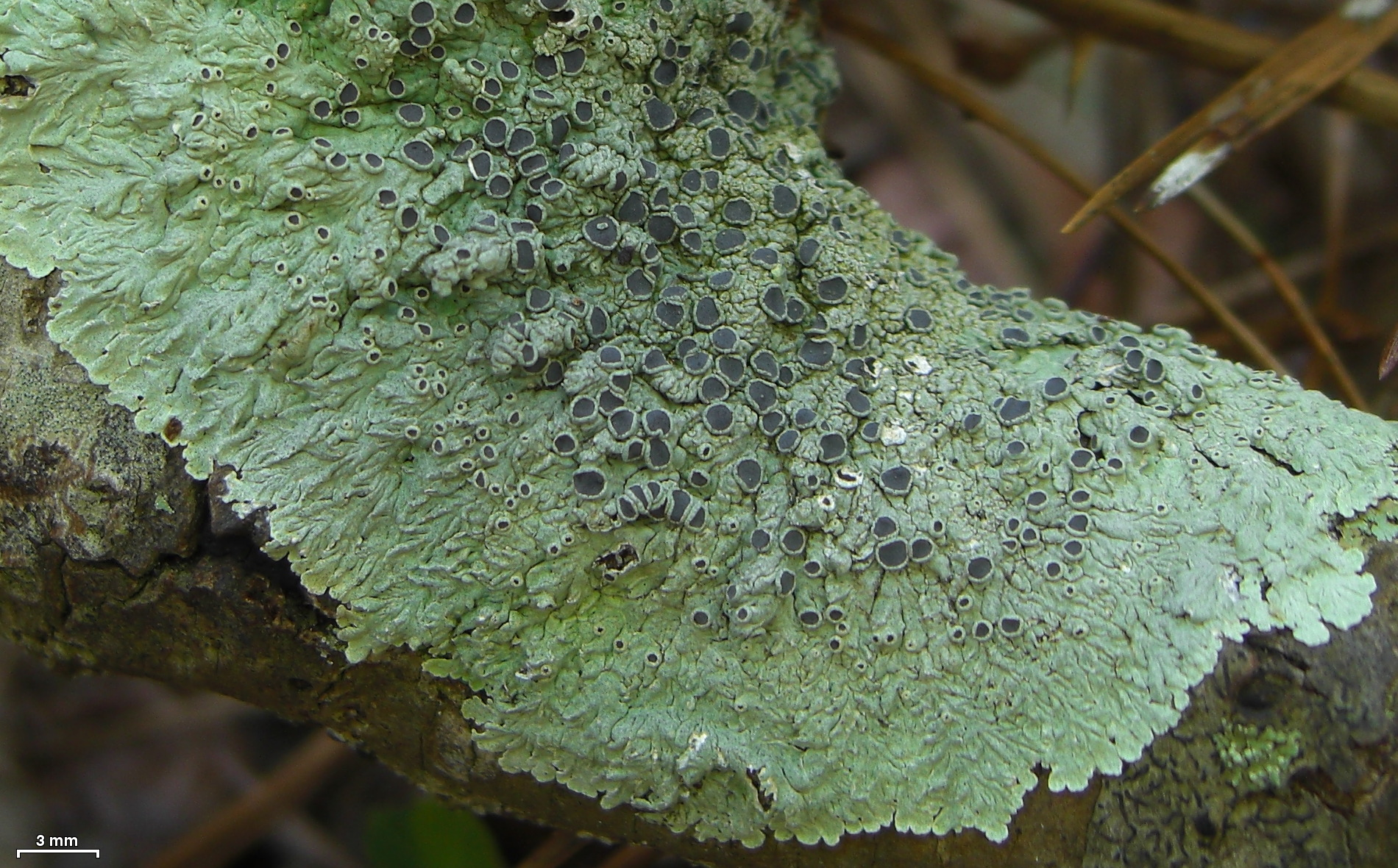
Clockwise from upper left: Tholurna dissimilis, which is a rare dwarf fruticose species that often grows in spherical clumps with radially protruding podetia topped by black, mazaedial ascomata; Buellia venusta; Dirinaria confusa; and Amandinea milliaria

As of June 2024, Species Fungorum accepts 39 genera and 669 species in the family Caliciaceae. This is a list of the genera in the Caliciaceae, based on a 2020 review and summary of fungal classification by Wijayawardene and colleagues. Following the genus name is the taxonomic authority (those who first circumscribed the genus; standardized author abbreviations are used), year of publication, and the number of species:

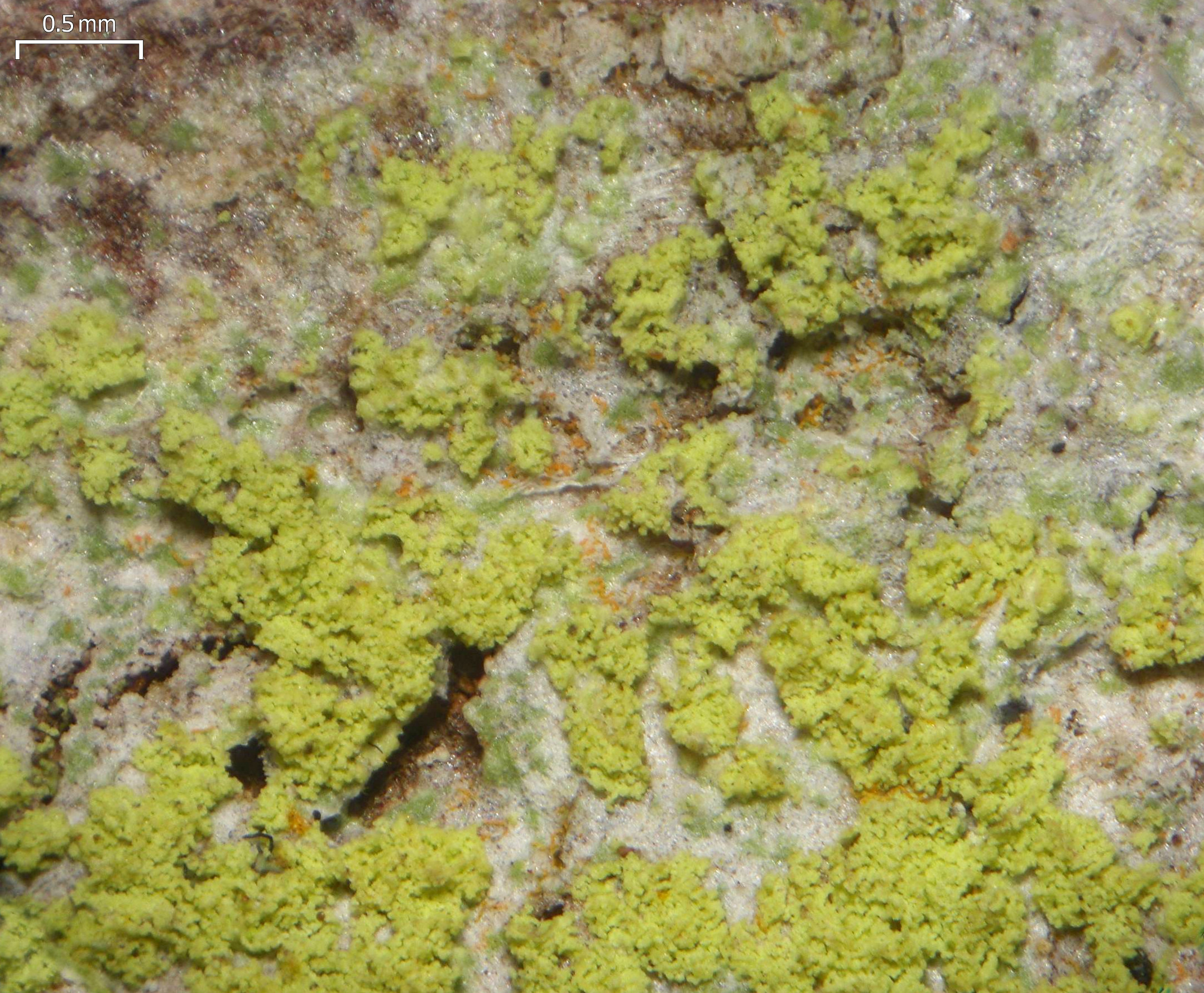
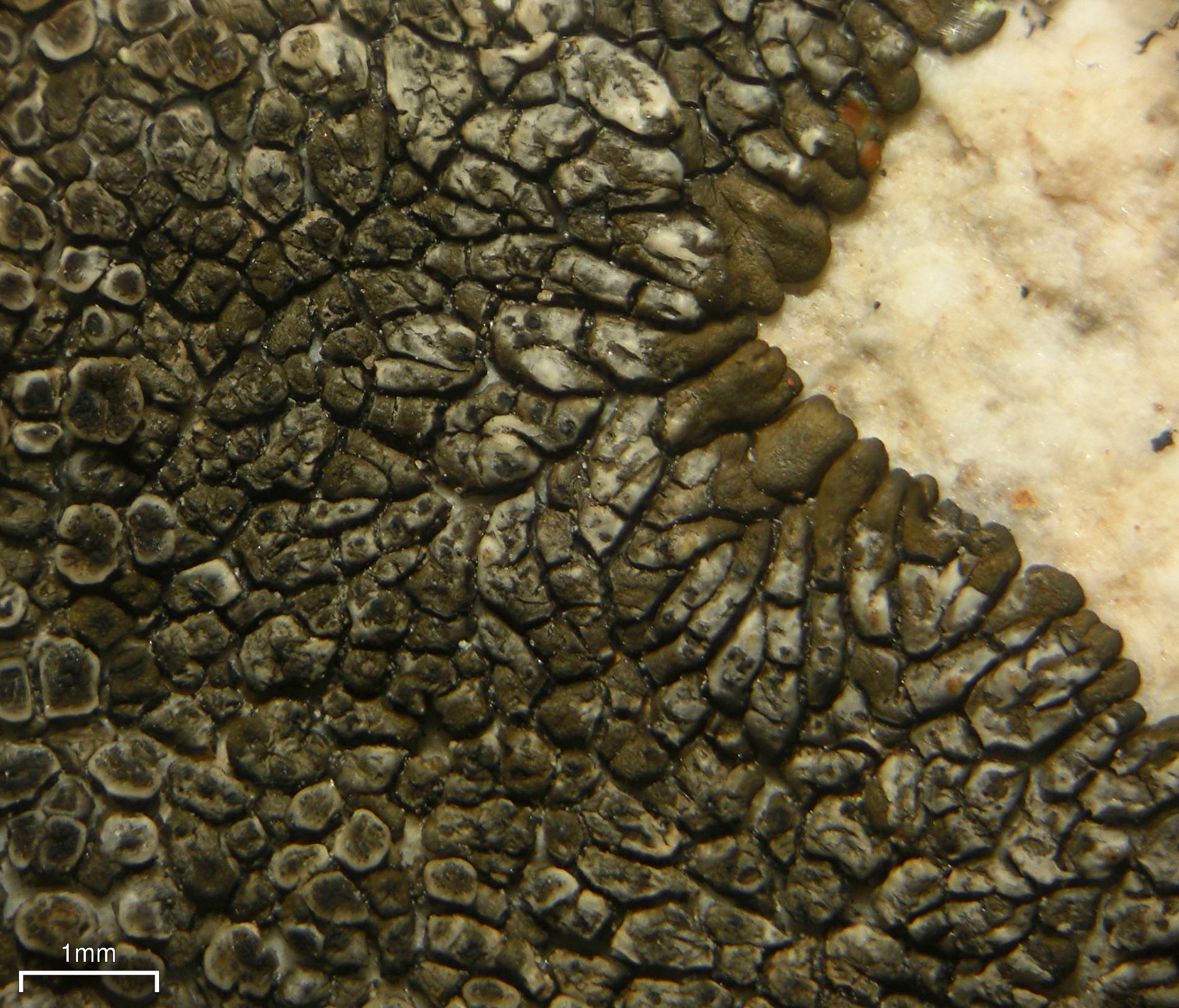
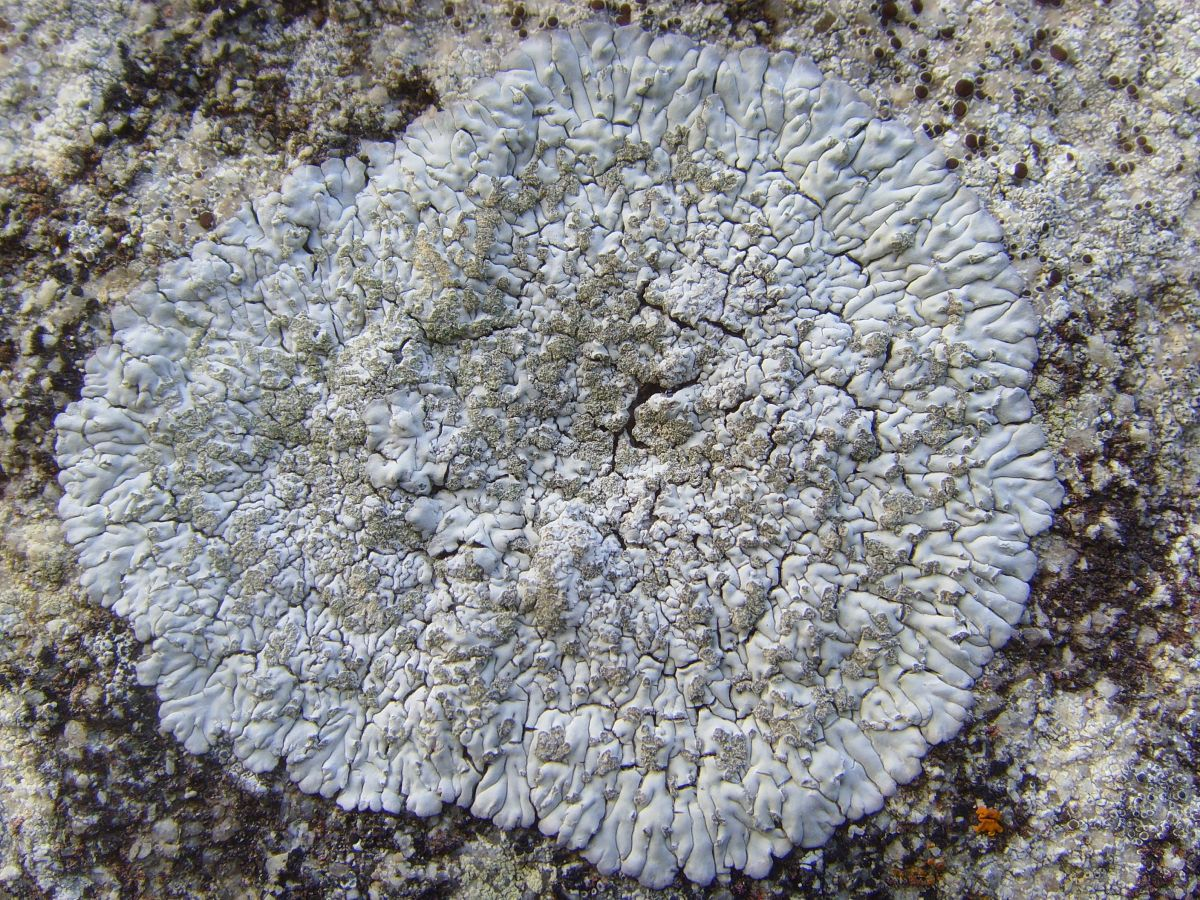
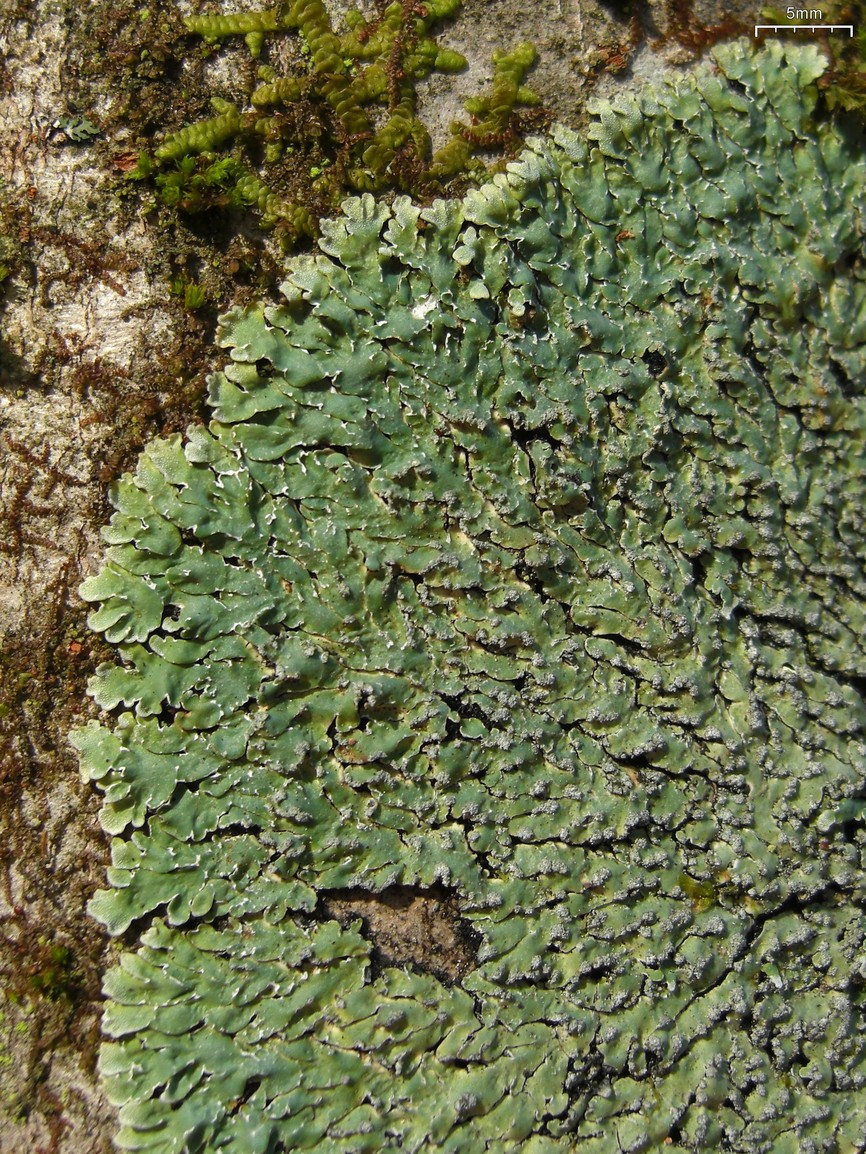
Clockwise from upper left: Ciposia wheeleri; Dimelaena thysanota; Pyxine sorediata; and Diploicia canescens
- Acolium (Ach.) Gray (1821) – 5 spp.
- Acroscyphus Lév. (1846) – 1 sp.
- Allocalicium M.Prieto & Wedin (2016) – 1 sp.
- Amandinea M.Choisy ex Scheid. & M.Mayrhofer (1993) – 35 spp.
- Australiaena Matzer, H.Mayrhofer & Elix (1997) – 1 sp.
- Baculifera Marbach & Kalb (2000) – 14 spp.
- Buellia De Not. (1846) – 300 spp.
- Burrowsia Fryday & I.Medeiros (2020) – 1 sp.
- Calicium Pers. (1794) – ca. 30 spp.
- Chrismofulvea Marbach (2000) – 4 spp.
- Ciposia Marbach (2000) – 1 sp. (Note: According to Index Fungorum, the genera Ciposia and Tylophoropsis are not correct names, as their publications were predated by homonyms, the plant genera Ciposia (Myrtaceae) and Tylophoropsis (Apocynaceae). The earliest-published names have precedence according to the Principle of Priority.)
- Cratiria Marbach (2000) – ca. 20 spp.
- Culbersonia Esslinger (2000) – 1 sp.
- Dermatiscum Nyl. (1867) – 3 spp.
- Dermiscellum Hafellner, H.Mayrhofer & Poelt (1979) – 1 sp.
- Dimelaena Norman (1852) – 10 spp.
- Diploicia A.Massal. (1852) – ca. 12 spp.
- Diplotomma Flot. (1849) – ca. 30 spp.
- Dirinaria (Tuck.) Clem. (1909) – ca. 35 spp.
- Endohyalina Marbach (2000) – 10 spp.
- Fluctua Marbach (2000) – 1 sp.
- Gassicurtia Fée (1825) – 30 spp.
- Hypoflavia Marbach (2000) – 3 spp.
- Monerolechia Trevis. (1857) – 4 spp.
- Orcularia (Malme) Kalb & Giralt (2011) – 4 spp.
- Pseudothelomma M.Prieto & Wedin (2016) – 2 spp.
- Pyxine Fr. (1825) – ca. 75 spp.
- Redonia C.W.Dodge (1973) – 2 spp.
- Santessonia Hale & Vobis (1978) – 10 spp.
- Sculptolumina Marbach (2000) – 4 spp.
- Sphinctrinopsis Woron. (1927) – 1 sp.
- Stigmatochroma Marbach (2000) – 9 spp.
- Tetramelas Norman (1852) – 16 spp.
- Texosporium Nádv. ex Tibell & Hofsten (1968) – 1 sp.
- Thelomma A.Massal. (1860) – 5 spp.
- Tholurna Norman (1861) – 1 sp.
- Tylophoropsis Sambo (1938) – 1 sp.

Some genera that have been until relatively recently classified as members of the Caliciaceae have had their status reassessed in light of molecular phylogenetic studies. For example, Cyphelium Ach. was synonymized with Calicium in 2016 when it was discovered that its type species grouped with the latter genus. Hafellia was placed in synonymy with Buellia when a proposal to replace the conserved type of Buellia, B. disciformis, with B. aethalea, was declined by the Nomenclature Committee for Fungi. That proposal had attempted to retain B. disciformis as the type for Hafellia, so that the name could continue to be used for a distinctive group of crustose lichens with thickened ascospore walls that had historically been treated in Buellia.

== Habitat and distribution ==
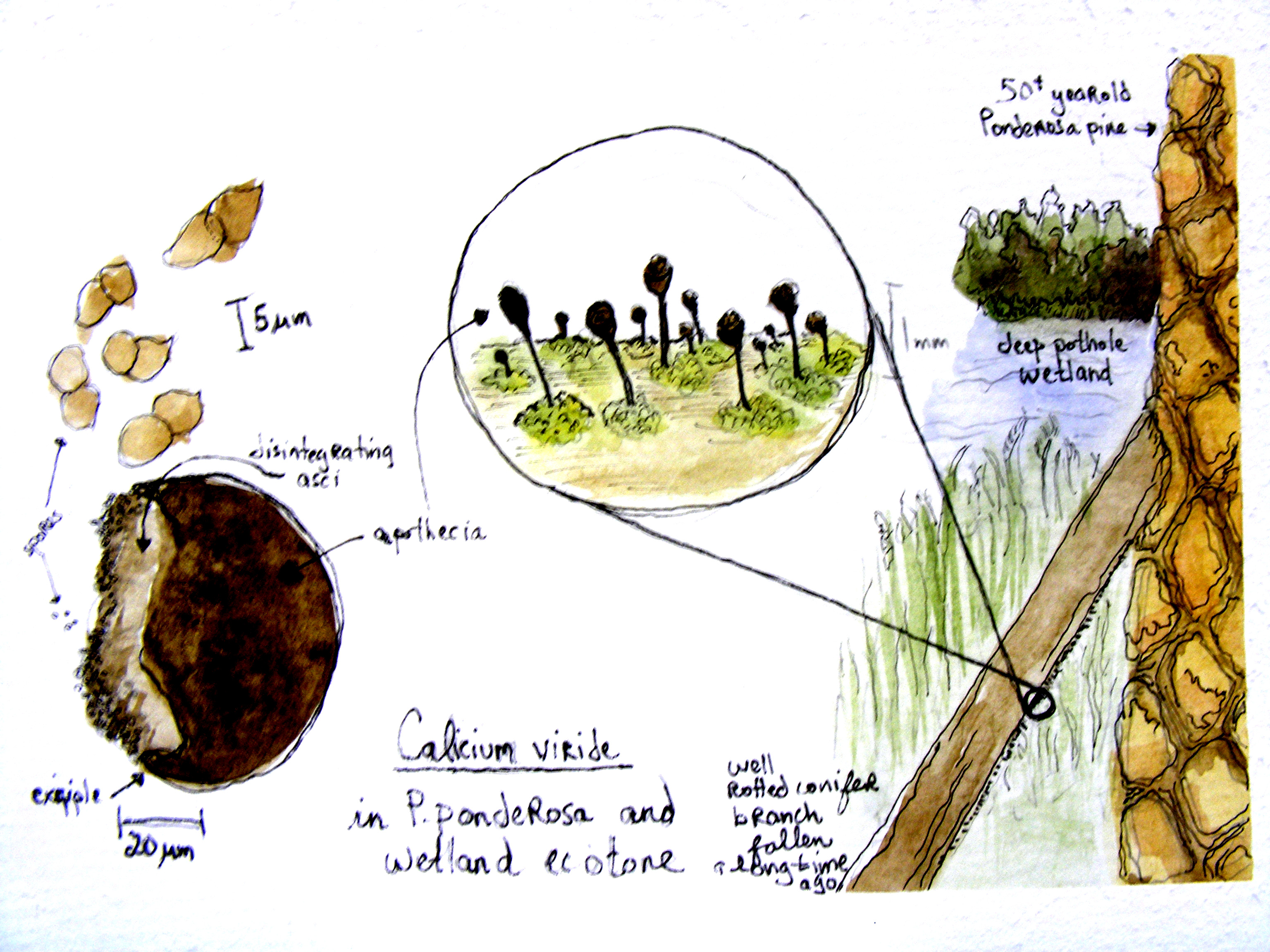
Illustration depicting typical habitat and some morphological features of a Calicium lichen found on the underside of a ponderosa pine branch.

Collectively, Caliciaceae species have a cosmopolitan distribution, although they are especially predominant in temperate and tropical montane areas. Most species form lichens that grow on bark or dead wood, although some grow on rocks. In contrast, Texosporium is part of the biological soil crust communities found in grasslands, and grows on cow dung, soil, and detritus. One rare species known only from a single locale in Sweden, Calicium episcalare, is parasitic on the common lichen Hypocenomyce scalaris. Like most calicioid species, the Caliciaceae tend to avoid competition with other lichens and often grow in microhabitats neglected by other lichens. Examples include: the side of a tree not inhabited by other corticolous species, in the cracks of deep fissures in bark, or woodpecker holes. Because of this preference for neglected locales, and their generally small size, the calicioid lichens tend to be overlooked by collectors and the group in general is poorly known.

Caliciaceae is one of the families whose species are most often found in mangrove forests of Calabarzon (Philippines). Similar results were reported in studies on mangrove forests in India, and the Gulf of Thailand, where the genera Dirinaria and Pyxine were found to be amongst the most common foliose lichens. The lichens found in the mangrove ecosystem tend to be salt-tolerant and moisture sensitive. Using next-generation sequencing techniques to detect the genetic signature of organisms, Caliciaceae species were identified as some of the most common endolithic lichens (crustose lichens that grow inside solid rock) found in the McMurdo Dry Valleys in Antarctica. This region features one of the most harsh environments on earth, with wide variations in temperature, extreme aridity, limited nutrients, and high levels of solar and UV radiation. The photobiont partner of the Caliciaceae is usually from the green algal genus Trebouxia, although Stichococcus has been recorded with Calicium.

== Conservation ==
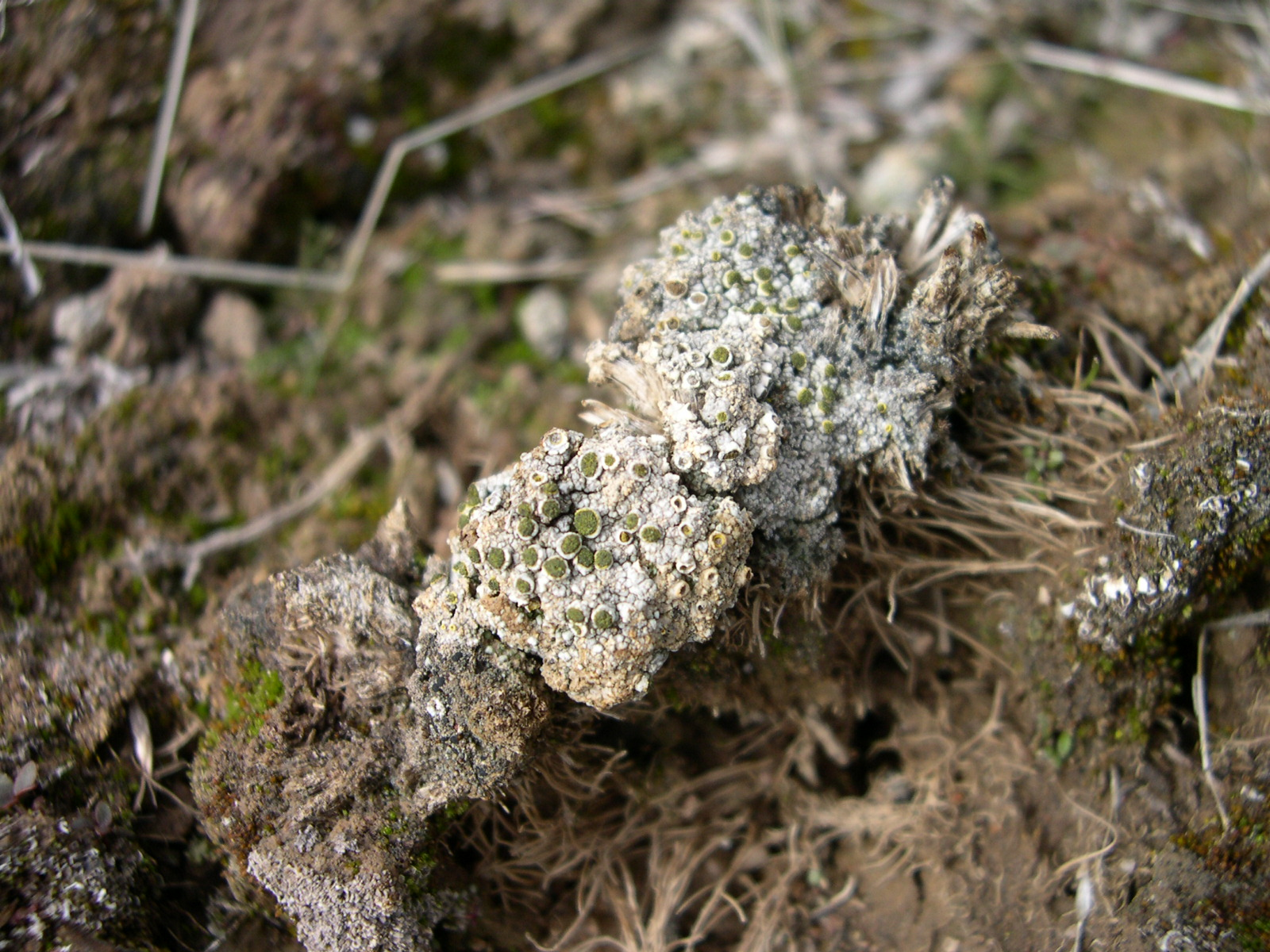
Texosporium sancti-jacobi, one of several Caliciaceae in the IUCN Red List

Caliciaceae species that have been assessed for the global IUCN Red List include the following: Buellia asterella (critically endangered, 2015), Buellia gypsyensis (vulnerable, 2020), Buellia sharpiana (vulnerable, 2020), Calicium sequoiae (endangered, 2021), Texosporium sancti-jacobi (endangered, 2020), and Thelomma carolinianum (endangered, 2017). On the red list of China's macrofungi, Acroscyphus sphaerophoroides (endangered, 2020) is the sole representative of the Caliciaceae.

== Human uses ==
Although there are no Caliciaceae species that are known to have economic significance, some of them have been exploited for scientific purposes. In a 1992 Swedish study, Allocalicium adaequatum (then a member of Calicium) was proposed as one of several bioindicator species that could be used to help assess forest continuity in boreal coniferous forests. A similar study conducted in the Acadian forest ecoregion of Atlantic Canada found several Caliciaceae species appropriate for determining continuity in old-growth forests.

Studies conducted in India suggest that Pyxine cocoes, a common, pollution-tolerant foliose lichen, is a candidate for biomonitoring of local air pollution. It bioaccumulates toxic heavy metals that it acquires from the air and retains the pollutants in the thallus, which can then be sampled and assayed to determine their concentration. Other Pyxine species in India with similar pollution-resistant properties are P. hispidula and P. subcinerea.

Buellia frigida, a crustose species that grows on rocks in the harsh Antarctic climate, has often been used as a model organism in astrobiology research. This extremophile lichen has been exposed to conditions simulating those encountered in space and on celestial bodies like Mars, including vacuum, UV radiation, and extreme dryness. B. frigida has demonstrated resilience to these space-related stressors, making it a candidate for studying how life can adapt to and potentially survive in extraterrestrial environments.

== Fossil record ==
A fossil belonging to Calicium was described from Baltic amber dating to 55–35 million years ago (Mya). This and other fossils were used to estimate the date of the split between the Caliciales (i.e., the Caliciaceae-Physciaceae clade as proposed by Gaya and colleagues in 2012) and the Teloschistales. In their analysis, this occurred in the Middle Jurassic, around 171 Mya. Other fossils have since been found. In 2018, three fossils assigned to Calicium were reported from European Paleogene amber. A Baltic amber fungus fossil, originally collected by Robert Caspary and assigned to the genus Stilbum (family Chionosphaeraceae) in 1886, was reassessed as a member of the Caliciales in 2019, as Calicium succini. Because it is considered to be "well-preserved and reliably identifiable", it is valuable for use in evolutionary studies that estimate the divergence times of fungal lineages.
