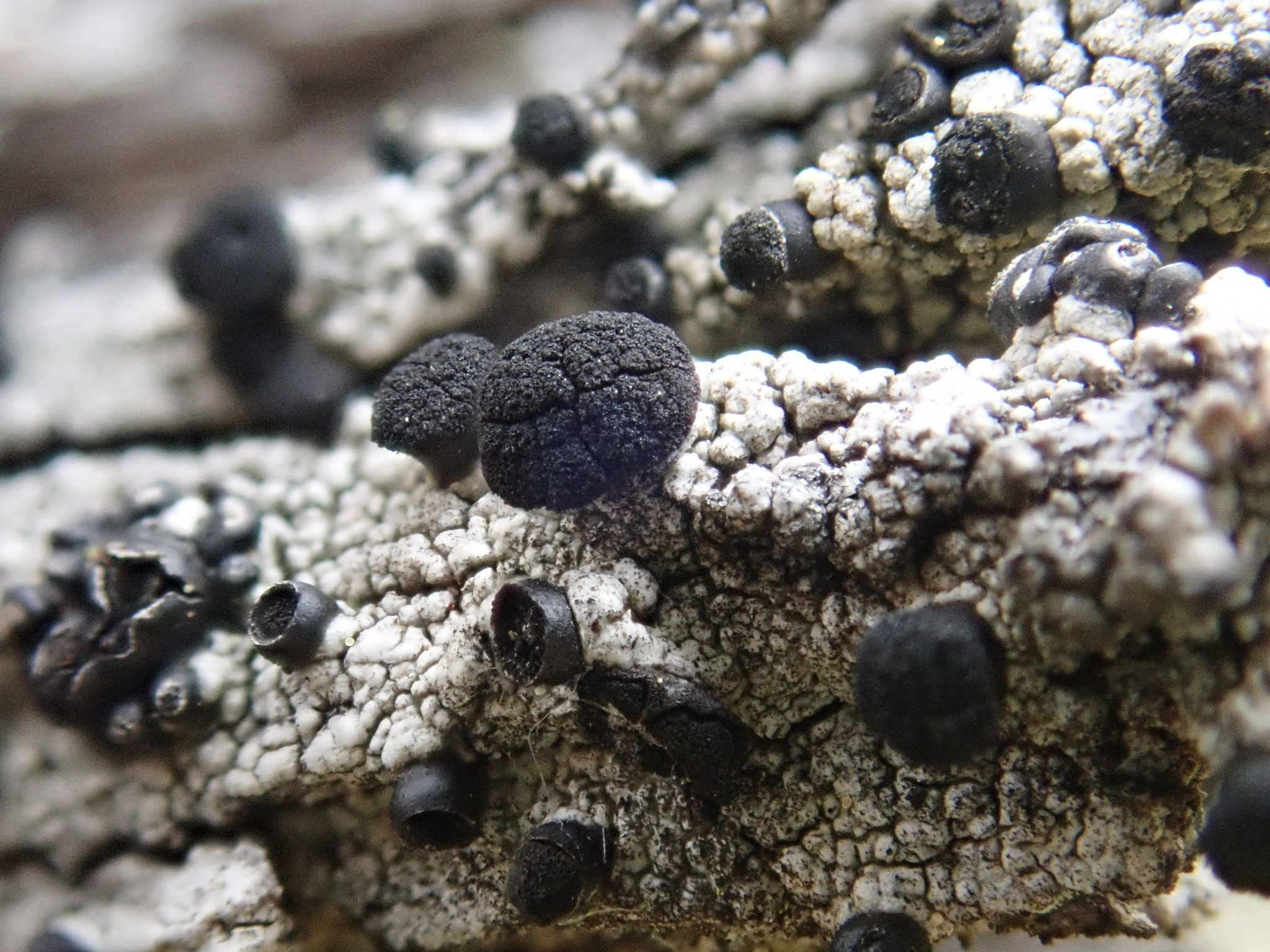
- Acolium inquinans

Scientific classification
- Domain: Eukaryota
- Kingdom: Fungi
- Division: Ascomycota
- Class: Lecanoromycetes
- Order: Caliciales
- Family: Caliciaceae
- Genus: Acolium (Ach.) Gray (1821)

Type species
- Acolium inquinans (Sm.) A.Massal. (1853)

Species
- A. chloroconium A. inquinans A. karelicum A. marcianum A. sessile A. yunnanense

Synonyms
- Calicium subdiv. Acolium Ach. (1808)

= Acolium =

Genus of lichens

Acolium is a genus of lichenized fungi in the family Caliciaceae. The genus has a widespread distribution and contains six species. These lichens are found on bark and wood, occasionally on rocks, or growing on other lichens.

The genus was originally proposed as a subdivision of Calicium by Erik Acharius in 1808, and promoted to generic status by Samuel Frederick Gray in 1821.

== Description ==
Acolium is characterized by a crustose thallus that can vary in appearance from a rough, warty surface to a cracked, mosaic-like pattern. The thallus can be thick or thin, and its colour ranges from grey to brownish. However, in species that live on other lichens, the thallus is absent. The cortex of these lichens is composed of interwoven hyphae, and they have a trebouxioid photobiont.

Acolium lichens produce apothecia, which are black, and can be either sessile or partially immersed. The true exciple is consistently thick, particularly at the base, and has a blackish-brown hue, occasionally displaying a white or grey powdery appearance. The hamathecium, which is not easily visible, consists of simple, unbranched paraphyses. Asci develop individually from ascogenous hyphae with croziers and are cylindrical in shape. They possess a single functional wall layer and disintegrate early on, releasing spores into a dry, black, powdery mass called a mazaedium.

The ascospores of Acolium lichens have a single septum; they have shapes ranging from broadly cylindrical to ellipsoidal. They exhibit a slight or pronounced constriction at the septum and have a thick, dark brown wall adorned with unique ornamentation such as irregular cracks, warts, or parallel ridges. The conidiomata, or pycnidia, are spherical or slightly flattened, measuring 50–200 μm in diameter, and initially semi-immersed in the thallus. The conidiophores are branched, and the conidia are aseptate and colourless, existing in two types: cylindrical and tapering at one end or ellipsoidal. Chemically, Acolium lichens contain pulvinic acid derivatives, which are yellow pigments, along with unidentified compounds.

== Species ==
As of April 2023, Species Fungorum (in the Catalogue of Life) accepts 6 species of Acolium.

- Acolium chloroconium Tuck. (1866)
- Acolium inquinans (Sm.) A.Massal. (1853)
- Acolium karelicum (Vain.) M.Prieto & Wedin (2016)
- Acolium marcianum (B.de Lesd.) M.Prieto & Wedin (2016)
- Acolium sessile (Pers.) Arnold (1885)
- Acolium yunnanense Thiyagaraja & K.D.Hyde (2021)
