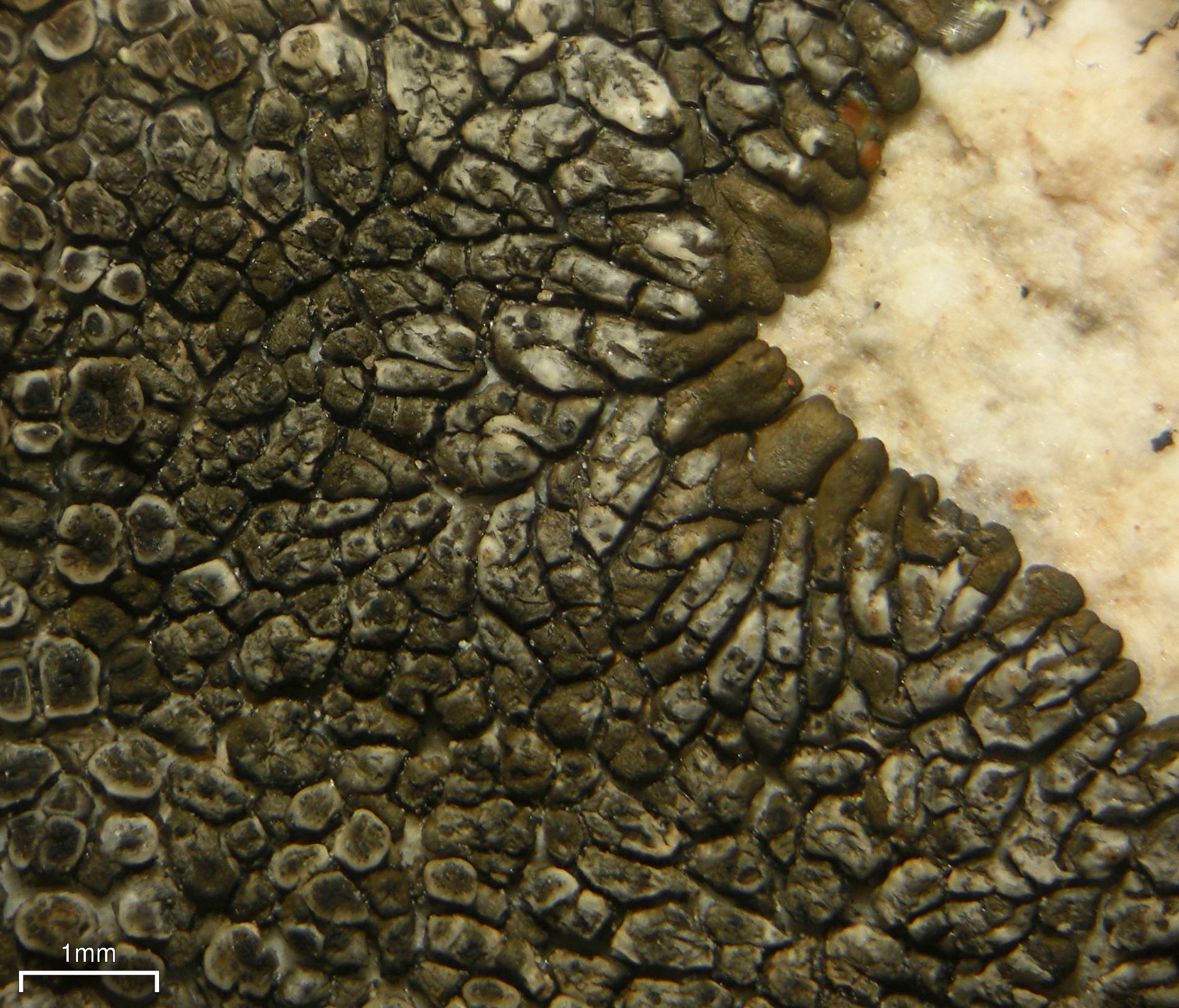

Scientific classification
- Domain: Eukaryota
- Kingdom: Fungi
- Division: Ascomycota
- Class: Lecanoromycetes
- Order: Caliciales
- Family: Caliciaceae
- Genus: Dimelaena
- Species: D. thysanota

Binomial name
- Dimelaena thysanota Hale & W.L.Culb.

= Dimelaena thysanota =

Species of fungus

Dimelaena thysanota (Mountain Lichen) is a crustose lichen in the family Physciaceae, found in the mountains of western North America and the Sonoran Desert.
