= Burrowsia =

Scientific classification
- Kingdom: Fungi
- Division: Ascomycota
- Class: Lecanoromycetes
- Order: Caliciales
- Family: Caliciaceae
- Genus: Burrowsia; Fryday & I.Medeiros 2020
- Species: B. cataractae

Binomial name
- Burrowsia cataractae Fryday & I.Medeiros (2020)

Genus of lichen

Burrowsia is a genus of the lichen family Caliciaceae. It is monospecific, containing the single crustose lichen Burrowsia cataractae. Both the species and the genus were newly described to science in 2020 by Alan Fryday and Ian Medeiros. Burrowsia cataractae is known from only a single location in Mpumalanga, South Africa. The lichen forms grey to greenish-brown crusty patches on permanently moist quartzite rocks in the spray zone of Calodendrum Falls, where it occupies a cool, humid microhabitat within shaded ravine forest. Molecular analysis confirms that Burrowsia represents a distinct evolutionary lineage within the Caliciaceae, separated from other related genera by its unusual ascospore structure and distinctive ascus features.

== Taxonomy ==
The genus Burrowsia was erected in 2020 by Alan Fryday and Ian Medeiros to accommodate the single species B. cataractae. The species epithet honours John and Sandie Burrows, long-time managers of Buffelskloof Nature Reserve, where the type collection was made. Burrowsia was collected in February 2016 during a four-week survey of Mpumalanga's neglected lichen funga. As the genus is monospecific, the authors considered a separate generic diagnosis superfluous, but they stressed its diagnostic combination of pigmented, somewhat muriform (chambered) ascospores and an ascus with a distinctive tube-like apical apparatus.

Subsequent multilocus molecular phylogenetics analysis placed Burrowsia within the family Caliciaceae yet on a long, well-supported branch separate from Buellia and other buellioid genera. This molecular isolation, together with the unusual ascus structure and spore morphology, underpins its recognition as a new genus rather than an aberrant species of an existing taxon. The popular account of the expedition notes that B. cataractae is the first genus of lichen-forming fungi described from South Africa for almost three decades, underscoring just how under-explored the country's crustose lichens remain.

== Description ==
The thallus—the main lichen body—is crustose and spreads as a grey- to greenish-brown rind that becomes cracked and areolate (broken into tiny plates) with age. A thin black prothallus sometimes rims its margin. Sectioning shows a thin hyaline upper cortex overlying a photobiont layer dominated by Trebouxia (a green algal genus). Beneath this lies a brown, vertically orientated medulla up to 250 micrometres (μm) deep.

Apothecia, the spore-bearing discs, are frequent, black to dark brown and initially half-sunken before becoming sessile and up to 0.8 mm across. They are lecideine—that is, they lack an algal rim—and possess a persistent, slightly paler margin. The hymenium reaches 130 μm tall and stains blue in iodine, while the asci are cylindrical and display a pale-blue staining tholus with a darker axial tube. Each ascus bears four to eight submuriform (partly chambered) ascospores, 23 × 12 μm on average, with a brown pigment but no transparent halo. Immersed pycnidia produce slender bacilliform conidia. Standard spot tests give K+ (red) reactions, and thin-layer chromatography detects norstictic acid plus two unidentified substances.

Another lichen with a similar morphology to Burrowsia cataractae is Rhizocarpon lavatum, which also occurs in similar damp habitats in the Northern Hemisphere and in New Zealand. This species, however, does not have pigmented ascospores and differs from B. cataractae in both the structure and chemistry of the ascus.

== Habitat and distribution ==
Burrowsia cataractae is known only from its type locality at 1500 m elevation in Buffelskloof Nature Reserve, Mpumalanga Province, South Africa. It colonises permanently moist quartzite boulders in the splash zone at the base of Calodendrum Falls, within a shaded ravine forest.

The surrounding vegetation biome is classified as Eastern Dry Afrotemperate Forest but the species occupies a cool, humid microhabitat kept damp by spray from the waterfall. Field surveys elsewhere in Mpumalanga, including other ultramafic and quartzitic sites, have not relocated the lichen.
