= Buellia gypsyensis =

Conservation status
- Vulnerable (IUCN 3.1)

Scientific classification
- Kingdom: Fungi
- Division: Ascomycota
- Class: Lecanoromycetes
- Order: Caliciales
- Family: Caliciaceae
- Genus: Buellia
- Species: B. gypsyensis

Binomial name
- Buellia gypsyensis Fryday (2019)

Species of lichen

Buellia gypsyensis is a species of crustose lichen in the family Caliciaceae. Found in the Falkland Islands, it was described as a new species in 2019 by British lichenologist Alan Fryday. The type was collected from Gypsy Cove near Port Stanley in East Falkland, where it was found growing on a north-facing rock; it is named for its type locality. The main distinguishing characteristics of the lichen are its filiform (threadlike) conidia and the presence of 5-O-methylhiascic acid as the major secondary chemical in the thallus.

In 2020, Buellia gypsyensis was assessed as a vulnerable species for the global IUCN Red List.

== See also ==
- List of Buellia species
