= Sculptolumina =

Scientific classification
- Domain: Eukaryota
- Kingdom: Fungi
- Division: Ascomycota
- Class: Lecanoromycetes
- Order: Caliciales
- Family: Caliciaceae
- Genus: Sculptolumina; Marbach 2000

Type species
- Sculptolumina japonica (Tuck.) Marbach (2000)

Species
- S. conradiae S. coreana S. japonica S. ramboldii S. serotina S. yunnanensis

Genus of lichens in the family Caliciaceae

Sculptolumina is a genus of corticolous lichens in the family Caliciaceae. The genus was circumscribed by Bernhard Marbach in 2000, with Sculptolumina japonica designated as the type species.

== Species ==
- Sculptolumina conradiae H.Mayrhofer, Giralt, van den Boom & Elix (2014)
- Sculptolumina coreana D.Liu, S.Y.Kondr. & Hur (2019) – Korea
- Sculptolumina japonica (Tuck.) Marbach (2000)
- Sculptolumina ramboldii Elix & H.Mayrhofer (2018) – Australia
- Sculptolumina serotina (Malme) Marbach (2000)
- Sculptolumina yunnanensis Watanuki & H.Harada (2019) – China
