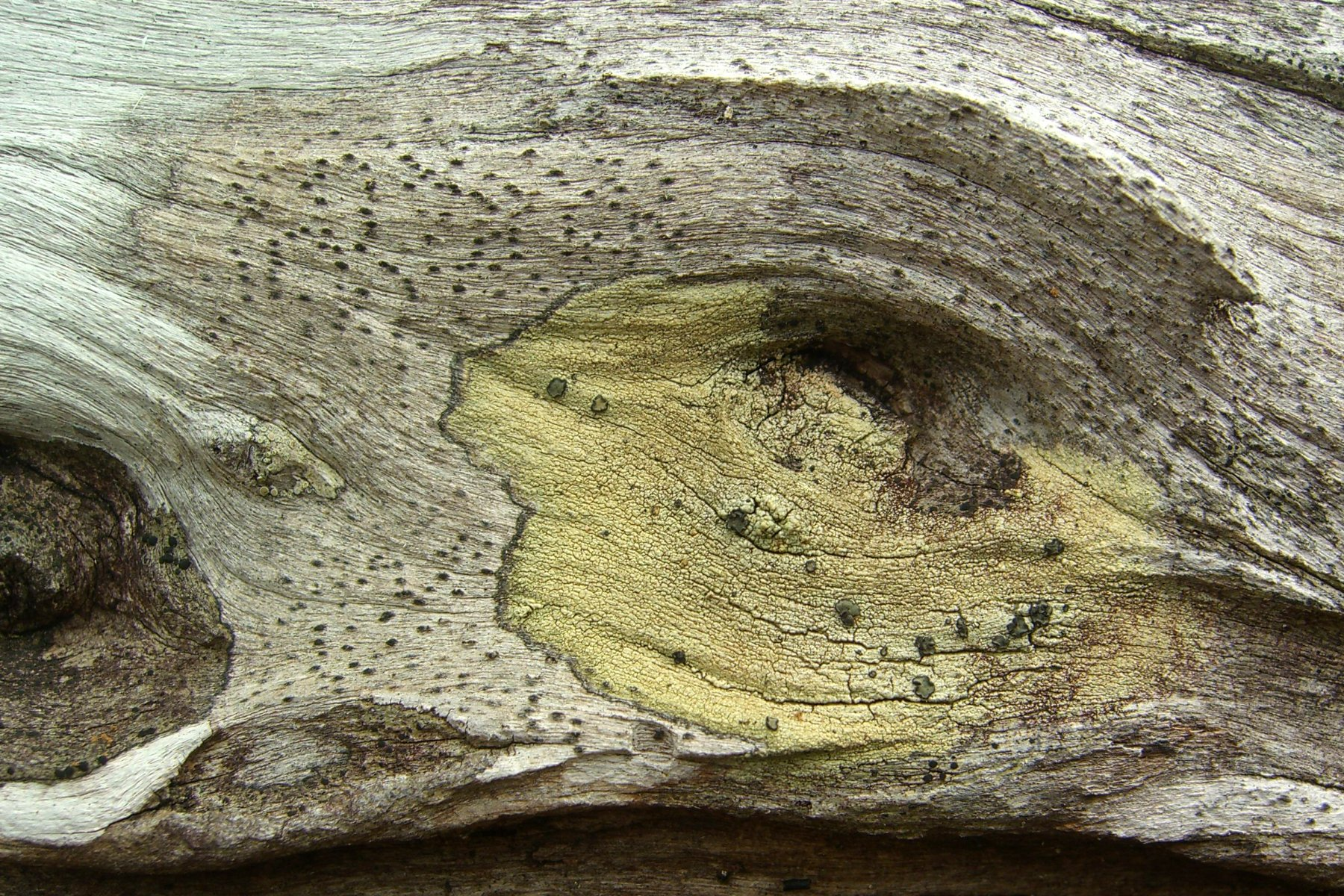
- The yellow crust in the center is Stigmatochroma gerontoides; specimen found in Key Largo, Florida Keys

Scientific classification
- Domain: Eukaryota
- Kingdom: Fungi
- Division: Ascomycota
- Class: Lecanoromycetes
- Order: Caliciales
- Family: Caliciaceae
- Genus: Stigmatochroma; Marbach (2000)

Type species
- Stigmatochroma epimartum (Nyl.) Marbach (2000)

= Stigmatochroma =

Genus of lichens in the family Caliciaceae

Stigmatochroma is a genus of lichenized fungi in the family Caliciaceae. The genus has a widespread distribution, and contains 9 species.

== Species ==
- Stigmatochroma adauctum (Malme) Marbach (2000)
- Stigmatochroma epiflavium Marbach (2000)
- Stigmatochroma epimartum (Nyl.) Marbach (2000)
- Stigmatochroma kryptoviolascens Marbach (2000)
- Stigmatochroma maccarthyi Elix (2016)
- Stigmatochroma metaleptodes (Nyl.) Marbach (2000)
- Stigmatochroma microsporum Mohabe, Nayaka & A.M. Reddy (2015)
- Stigmatochroma sorediatum Marbach & V.Wirth (2000)
