= Culbersonia =

Conservation status
- Apparently Secure (NatureServe)

Scientific classification
- Kingdom: Fungi
- Division: Ascomycota
- Class: Lecanoromycetes
- Order: Caliciales
- Family: Caliciaceae
- Genus: Culbersonia; Essl. (2000)
- Species: C. nubila

Binomial name
- Culbersonia nubila Essl. (2000)

Lichen genus in the family Caliciaceae

Culbersonia is a fungal genus in the family Caliciaceae. This is a monotypic genus, containing the single foliose lichen Culbersonia nubila (formerly called Culbersonia americana). This species, which grows on trees and rocks, is found in dry subtropical regions of the world, particularly in Africa and Central America.

== Taxonomy ==
The genus Culbersonia was circumscribed by Ted Esslinger in 2000, to contain a lichen he collected from Arizona that he named Culbersonia americana.

The genus name of Culbersonia is in honour of Chicita Frances 'Nan' Culberson, (1931–2023), an American botanist (Mycology und Lichenology), who worked as a botanical researcher at Duke University in Durham/North Carolina and William Louis "Bill" Culberson (1929–2003), an American lichenologist. As they were "longtime friends and mentors" of Esslinger.

After Culbersonia americana was published, it was determined that the Arizona species was the same as one previously described from Africa in 1980 by Roland Moberg, called Pyxine nubila. A new combination was made in a 2002 publication, and the name Culbersonia nubila was proposed.

Culbersonia was until recently thought to belong to the Physciaceae due to morphological similarities with some of the genera in that family. Recent (2019) molecular phylogenetic analysis showed that it forms a monophyletic clade with Pyxine and Diplotomma, both of which are in the Caliciaceae. These three genera are morphologically distinguished from the other Caliciaceae by the appressed foliose growth form and the absence of a mazaedium (a fruit body consisting of a powdery mass of free ascospores).

== Habitat and distribution ==
Culbersonia nubila grows on trees and rocks. It is found in dry subtropical regions of the world, particularly in Africa and Central America.
