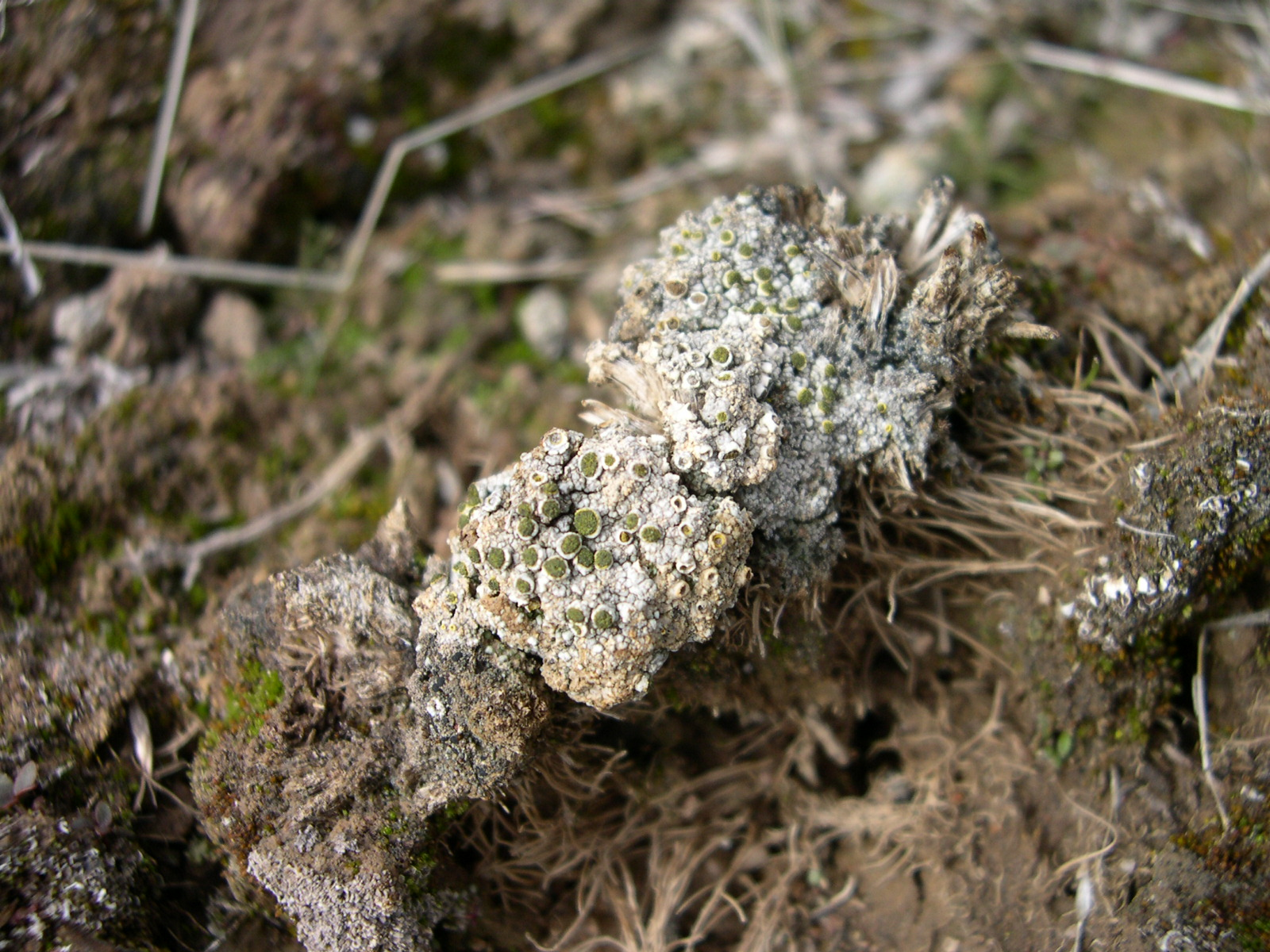
- in Snake River Plain, Idaho

Conservation status
- Endangered (IUCN 3.1)

- Vulnerable (NatureServe)

Scientific classification
- Kingdom: Fungi
- Division: Ascomycota
- Class: Lecanoromycetes
- Order: Caliciales
- Family: Caliciaceae
- Genus: Texosporium; Nádv. ex Tibell & Hofsten (1968)
- Species: T. sancti-jacobi

Binomial name
- Texosporium sancti-jacobi (Tuck.) Nádv. ex Tibell & Hofsten

Synonyms
- Acolium sancti-jacobi Tuck. (1883); Trachylia sancti-jacobi (Tuck.) Nyl. (1890); Cyphelium sancti-jacobi (Tuck.) Zahlbr. (1922); Texosporium sancti-jacobi (Tuck.) Nádv. (1942)

= Texosporium =

Genus of lichen

Texosporium is a genus of lichenized fungi in the family Caliciaceae. It is a monotypic genus, containing the single species Texosporium sancti-jacobi, found in the United States. The genus is characterized by microscopic features: the ascospores are coated with a layer of cells that are derived from the paraphyses. Texosporium was originally circumscribed by Josef Nádvorník in 1942, albeit the name was not validly published. In 1968, Leif Tibell and Angelica van Hofsten published the name validly. In 2020, Texosporium sancti-jacobi was added to the global IUCN Red List, where it is classified as endangered.
