= Santessonia =

Scientific classification
- Domain: Eukaryota
- Kingdom: Fungi
- Division: Ascomycota
- Class: Lecanoromycetes
- Order: Caliciales
- Family: Caliciaceae
- Genus: Santessonia; Hale & Vobis (1978)

Type species
- Santessonia namibensis Hale & Vobis (1978

Genus of lichens

Santessonia is a genus of lichenized fungi in the family Caliciaceae. The genus was circumscribed in 1978 by lichenologists Mason Hale and Gernot Vobis, with Santessonia namibensis assigned as the type species, and at that time, only species. This species, endemic to the Namib Desert, has deep depressions (lacunae) in the thallus, which are interpreted as an adaptation to take advantage of the infrequent moisture provided by fog. The genus name honours Norwegian lichenologist Rolf Santesson.

== Species ==
- Santessonia cervicornis (Follmann) Follmann (1995)
- Santessonia hereroensis (Vain.) Follmann (1987)
- Santessonia lagunebergii Sérus. & Wessels (1984)
- Santessonia namibensis Hale & Vobis (1978)
- Santessonia peruviensis Follmann (2006)
- Santessonia roccelloides Follmann (2006)
- Santessonia sorediata Sérus. & Wessels (1984)
