= Redonia =

Scientific classification
- Domain: Eukaryota
- Kingdom: Fungi
- Division: Ascomycota
- Class: Lecanoromycetes
- Order: Caliciales
- Family: Caliciaceae
- Genus: Redonia; C.W.Dodge (1973)
- Species: R. chilena

Binomial name
- Redonia chilena C.W.Dodge (1973)

Genus of fungi

Redonia is a genus of lichenized fungi in the family Caliciaceae. It contains the single species Redonia chilena, a squamulose lichen. The type specimen was collected in Tarapacá, Chile, where it was found growing on calcareous soil. The genus was circumscribed in 1973 by Carroll William Dodge. The genus name honours Jorge Redón Figueroa, a Chilean lichenologist who collected the type.

In his original circumscription of the genus, Dodge included the species Redonia cladocarpiza (transferred from Buellia), but this species is now known as Tetramelas cladocarpizus.
