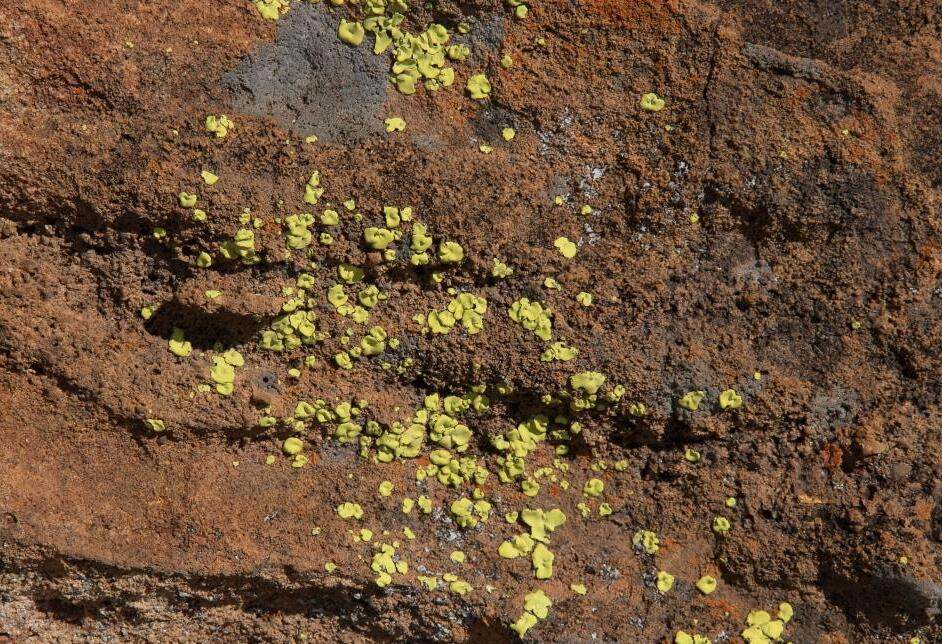
- Dermatiscum thunbergii growing on rocks at Isalo National Park, Madagascar

Scientific classification
- Domain: Eukaryota
- Kingdom: Fungi
- Division: Ascomycota
- Class: Lecanoromycetes
- Order: Caliciales
- Family: Caliciaceae
- Genus: Dermatiscum; Nyl. (1867)

Type species
- Dermatiscum thunbergii (Ach.) Nyl. (1867)

Species
- D. pusillum D. thunbergii

= Dermatiscum =

Genus of lichens

Dermatiscum is a genus of lichen-forming fungi in the family Caliciaceae. The genus contains two species found in South Africa and North America.
