= Dermiscellum =

Scientific classification
- Domain: Eukaryota
- Kingdom: Fungi
- Division: Ascomycota
- Class: Lecanoromycetes
- Order: Caliciales
- Family: Caliciaceae
- Genus: Dermiscellum; Hafellner, H.Mayrhofer & Poelt (1979)

Type species
- Dermiscellum catawbense (Willey) Hafellner & Poelt (1979)

Species
- D. catawbense D. oulocheilum

Genus of lichen

Dermiscellum is a genus of lichen-forming fungi in the family Caliciaceae.

== Species ==
- Dermiscellum catawbense (Willey) Hafellner & (Poelt 1979)
- Dermiscellum oulocheilum (Tuck.) Lendemer (2003)
