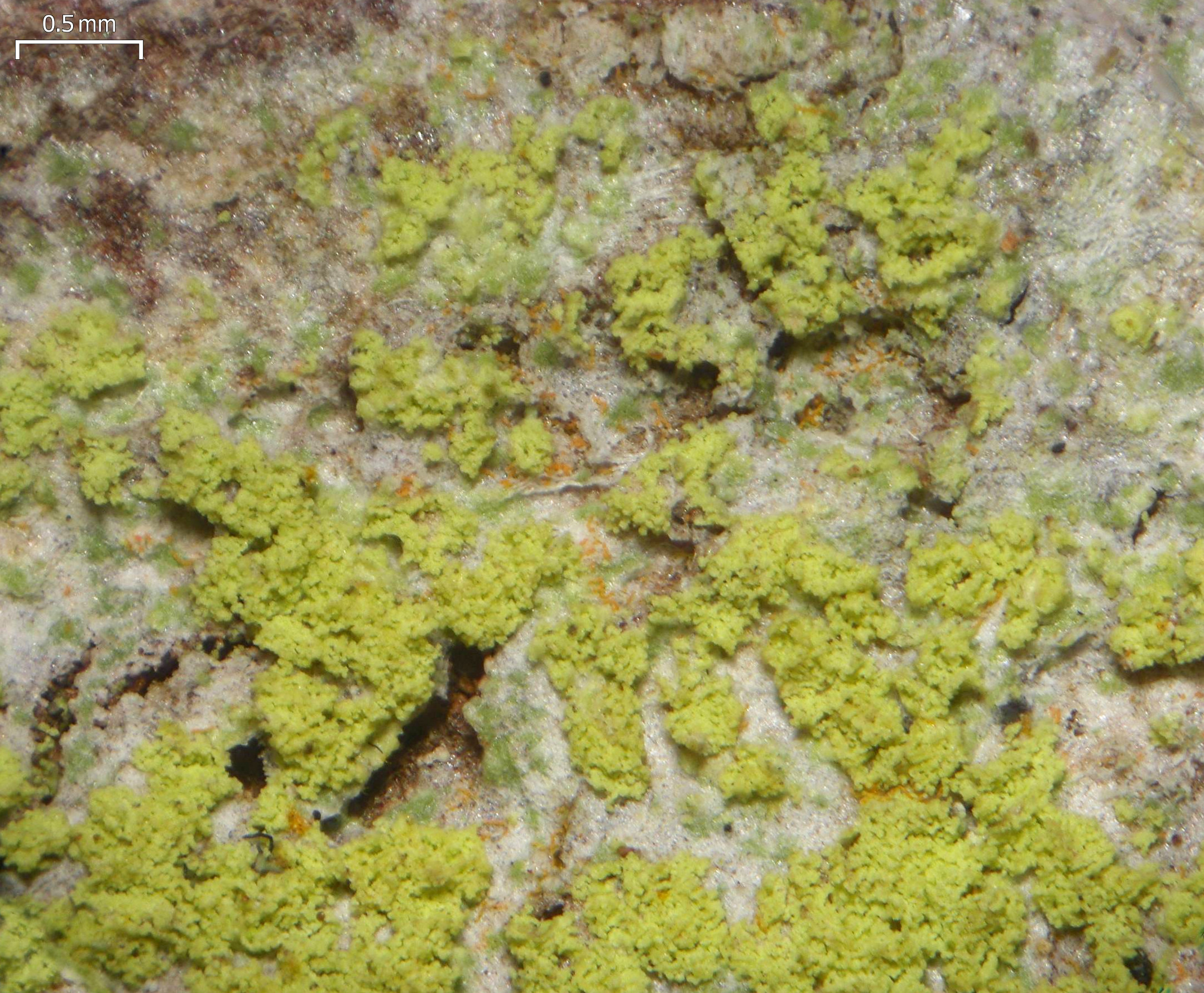
- Ciposia wheeleri on southern live oak in North Carolina, USA

Scientific classification
- Kingdom: Fungi
- Division: Ascomycota
- Class: Lecanoromycetes
- Order: Caliciales
- Family: Caliciaceae
- Genus: Ciposia; Marbach (2000)
- Species: C. wheeleri

Binomial name
- Ciposia wheeleri (R.C.Harris) Marbach (2000)

Synonyms
- Buellia wheeleri R.C.Harris (1988)

= Ciposia =

Genus of lichen-forming fungus

Ciposia is a single-species fungal genus in the family Caliciaceae. Circumscribed by Bernhard Marbach in 2000, it contains the species Ciposia wheeleri, a corticolous (bark-dwelling) and crustose lichen. This species was originally classified in genus Buellia by Richard C. Harris in 1988.

According to Index Fungorum, Ciposia is not a correct name, as its publication was predated by a homonym, the plant genus Ciposia (family Myrtaceae), which was published by Brazilian botanist Alvaro Astolpho da Silveira in 1918. The earliest-published name has precedence according to the Principle of priority.
