= Hypoflavia =

Scientific classification
- Domain: Eukaryota
- Kingdom: Fungi
- Division: Ascomycota
- Class: Lecanoromycetes
- Order: Caliciales
- Family: Caliciaceae
- Genus: Hypoflavia; Marbach (2000)

Type species
- Hypoflavia velloziae (Kalb) Marbach (2000)

Genus of lichen

Hypoflavia is a genus of lichenized fungi in the family Caliciaceae. The genus in found in South America, especially in tropical regions, and contains two species.
