= Fluctua =

Scientific classification
- Kingdom: Fungi
- Division: Ascomycota
- Class: Lecanoromycetes
- Order: Caliciales
- Family: Caliciaceae
- Genus: Fluctua; Marbach (2000)
- Species: F. megapotamica

Binomial name
- Fluctua megapotamica (Malme) Marbach (2000)

Synonyms
- Buellia megapotamica Malme (1919)

Genus of lichen

Fluctua is a lichen genus in the family Caliciaceae. It is monotypic, containing the single crustose lichen species Fluctua megapotamica. The genus was circumscribed by Austrian lichenologist Bernhard Marbach in 2000. It was one of several segregate genera proposed by Marbach in his 2000 revision of American species of Buellia. The lichen is found in Brazil and Uruguay.
