= Monerolechia =

Scientific classification
- Domain: Eukaryota
- Kingdom: Fungi
- Division: Ascomycota
- Class: Lecanoromycetes
- Order: Caliciales
- Family: Caliciaceae
- Genus: Monerolechia; Trevis. (1857)

Type species
- Monerolechia bayrhofferi (Schaer.) Trevis. (1857)

Species
- M. bayrhofferi M. californica M. glomerulans M. norstictica M. papuensis

Genus of lichens

Monerolechia is a genus of lichen-forming fungi in the family Caliciaceae. These lichens form crusty patches that break into small blocks or flakes, typically coloured chocolate to grey-brown, and produce black fruiting bodies for reproduction. Most species in this genus start life as parasites on other lichens before developing their own independent growth, which helps distinguish them from similar-looking lichen groups.

== Taxonomy ==
The genus was circumscribed by the Italian Vittore Benedetto Antonio Trevisan de Saint-Léon in 1865. He assigned Monerolechia bayrhofferi as the type species. In his original description, Trevisan distinguished Monerolechia from other genera in what was then called the Physmatopsideae group by its distinctive apothecia, which he described as having thick margins that extend completely around the fruiting bodies. He noted that the genus differed from both Bacidia and Bilimbia in this characteristic feature. Trevisan's description included detailed observations of the spore characteristics, describing them as oblong-cylindrical, blunt at both ends, slightly curved, and typically containing four cells, though he noted they could sometimes appear to have fewer divisions.

== Description ==
Species of Monerolechia develop a crust-like (crustose) body that breaks into tiny blocks (areoles) or minute, leaf-like flakes (squamules). These squamules are shallowly convex to strongly swollen (bullate), sit flat against the surface or gather in low, clumped tufts, and range in colour from deep chocolate to grey- or green-brown. A delicate epinecral film often covers the upper surface, while a dark prothallus—an initial, fibrous fungal growth at the margin—may be present or scarcely visible. Internally, the thallus contains a single-celled green alga of the chlorococcoid type as its photosynthetic partner; standard iodine staining tests show the medulla to be starch-negative (I–).

The sexual reproductive structures are black apothecia that develop flush with the thallus or sit on short stalks. In many species a rim of thallus tissue surrounds the disc (the thalline margin). Both disc and margin remain dark and never carry the pale, powdery bloom (pruina) seen in some related genera. Microscopy reveals a thin, weakly differentiated outer wall and a brown epithecium above a clear hymenium that lacks oil droplets. Slender paraphyses stand among eight-spored, Lecanora-type asci; their tips swell and are capped by brown pigment. Mature ascospores are small, one-septate, smooth-walled, and dark brown. Vegetative reproduction occurs in flask-shaped pycnidia embedded in the thallus; these produce colourless, rod-shaped conidia.

== Ecology ==
Ecologically, most Monerolechia species begin life as parasites on other lichens and later form an independent thallus, a lifestyle—together with their spore and conidial features—that sets the genus apart from the large, superficially similar genus Buellia.

== Species ==
- Monerolechia bayrhofferi (Schaer.) Trevis. (1857)
- Monerolechia californica (H.Magn.) Elix (2015)
- Monerolechia glomerulans (Müll.Arg.) Elix (2015)
- Monerolechia norstictica Elix (2015)
- Monerolechia papuensis Elix (2016)
