= Endohyalina =

Scientific classification
- Domain: Eukaryota
- Kingdom: Fungi
- Division: Ascomycota
- Class: Lecanoromycetes
- Order: Caliciales
- Family: Caliciaceae
- Genus: Endohyalina; Marbach (2000)

Type species
- Endohyalina rappii (Imshaug ex R.C.Harris) Marbach (2000)

Genus of lichen-forming fungi

Endohyalina is a genus of 10 species of corticolous (bark-dwelling) crustose lichens in the family Caliciaceae. These lichens either form thin, tightly attached crusts on tree bark or live as parasites on other lichens, sometimes becoming so reduced that they are nearly invisible to the naked eye. They produce small, black, disc-shaped fruiting bodies that begin buried in the crust and later emerge flush with the surface, containing spores that are divided once by a cross-wall and darken to brown as they mature.

== Taxonomy ==
The genus was circumscribed by the German lichenologist Bernhard Marbach in 2000, with Endohyalina rappii designated as the type species.

== Description ==
Endohyalina species either form a thin, tightly attached crust (a crustose thallus) on the substrate or live on other lichens, in which case their own thallus is reduced to the point of being invisible. When present, the photosynthetic partner is a single-celled green alga (a chlorococcoid photobiont). Sexual fruit-bodies are small, black apothecia of the lecideine type: they begin buried in the thallus and soon become flush with or slightly raised above the surface. A rim of thallus tissue (a thalline margin) is lacking or soon erodes, so the black disc appears sharply delimited. Microscopy reveals only a rudimentary outer wall (true exciple) whose dark outer zone contains hyphae with somewhat swollen cells, while the inner zone grades into the colourless tissue of the hymenium. The hymenium itself may contain scattered oil droplets and sits atop a pale- to dark-brown hypothecium.

Inside each apothecium, unbranched paraphyses stand among Bacidia-type asci. The paraphyses terminate in enlarged cells capped by a dark brown pigment, giving the inner surface a tufted appearance. Mature ascospores are small, ellipsoidal to spindle-shaped, divided once by a cross-wall (septum) and darkening to brown except at the paler ends. Their internal walls thicken in characteristic patterns (chiefly the Dirinaria type, but intermediate forms towards Milvina-, Physconia- or Pachysporaria-types also occur); the thickenings appear before the septum forms, a developmental sequence known as "ontogeny type B". The spore surface ranges from smooth to minutely wrinkled. Vegetative reproduction takes place in sunken pycnidia, which release colourless, rod-shaped conidia. Chemical analyses have detected a suite of secondary metabolites, including diploicin, fulgidin, isofulgidin, and a range of related depsidones such as dechlorodiploicin, caloploicin, brialmontin 1, atranorin, and several secalonic acids.

== Species ==
As of June 2025, Species Fungorum (in the Catalogue of Life) accept 11 species of Endohyalina:

- Endohyalina arachniformis Elix & Kantvilas (2015) – Australia
- Endohyalina brandii Giralt, van den Boom & Elix (2010)
- Endohyalina circumpallida (H.Magn.) Marbach (2000)
- Endohyalina diederichii Giralt, van den Boom & Elix (2010)
- Endohyalina ericina (Nyl.) Giralt, van den Boom & Elix (2010)
- Endohyalina gillamsensis Elix & Kantvilas (2016) – Australia
- Endohyalina insularis (Arnold) Giralt, van den Boom & Elix (2010)
- Endohyalina interjecta (Müll.Arg.) Giralt (2010)
- Endohyalina kalbii (Giralt & Matzer) Giralt, van den Boom & Elix (2010)
- Endohyalina parmotrematis Ngangom, Shweta Sharma, S.Joseph & Nayaka (2022)
- Endohyalina rappii (Imshaug ex R.C.Harris) Marbach (2000)
