= Chrismofulvea =

Scientific classification
- Domain: Eukaryota
- Kingdom: Fungi
- Division: Ascomycota
- Class: Lecanoromycetes
- Order: Caliciales
- Family: Caliciaceae
- Genus: Chrismofulvea; Marbach (2000)

Type species
- Chrismofulvea dialyta (Nyl.) Marbach (2000)

Species
- C. dialyta C. omalia C. pinastri C. rubifaciens

Genus of lichens

Chrismofulvea is a genus of lichen-forming fungi in the family Caliciaceae. The genus was circumscribed by Austrian lichenologist Bernhard Marbach in 2000, with Chrismofulvea dialyta assigned as the type species. It was one of several segregate genera proposed by Marbach in his 2000 revision of American species of Buellia.

== Species ==
- Chrismofulvea dialyta (Nyl.) Marbach (2000)
- Chrismofulvea omalia Marbach (2000) – Costa Rica
- Chrismofulvea pinastri (Erichsen) Marbach (2000)
- Chrismofulvea rubifaciens (R.C.Harris) Marbach (2000) – Brazil; Florida
