= Sphinctrinopsis =

Scientific classification
- Domain: Eukaryota
- Kingdom: Fungi
- Division: Ascomycota
- Class: Lecanoromycetes
- Order: Caliciales
- Family: Caliciaceae
- Genus: Sphinctrinopsis; Woron. (1927)

Type species
- Sphinctrinopsis pertusariae Woron. (1927)

Lichen genus in the family Caliciaceae

Sphinctrinopsis is a lichen genus in the family Caliciaceae. The genus, distributed in the former USSR, is monotypic, containing the single species Sphinctrinopsis pertusariae.
