= Grace E. Howard =

American lichenologist

Grace Elizabeth Howard
- Born: 1886; Pennsylvania
- Died: 1978 (aged 91–92); Washington
- Resting place: Sunset Hills Memorial Park, Bellevue, Washington
- Education: University of Washington
- Occupations: Lichenologist, teacher, professor of botany
- Employer: Wellesley College

Grace Elizabeth Howard (1886-1978) was an American lichenologist, teacher, and a professor of botany at Wellesley College for twenty-eight years.

== Early life and education ==
Grace Elizabeth Howard was born in Pennsylvania, and raised in Washington, the daughter of Henry and Elizabeth Howard. As a young woman, she was a passionate climber, accompanying her sister Ann Howard on climbs before she was officially old enough to join The Mountaineers. The sisters climbed Mount Noyes, Mount Queets, and the Middle Peak. In 1917, Howard was one of the organizers of the first Mountaineer Knapsack Trip. This, wrote Stella Degenhardt, was "a backpacking, rather than a pack-horse outing which explored the area from Snoqualmie Pass, via Goldmeyer Hot Springs, Lake Dorothy (with dugout canoe), Skykomish River, and Glacier Basin to Monte Cristo".

Howard earned her B.A. from the University of Washington in 1911, and subsequently taught at a school in Wapato, Washington. Ten years later, she returned to the University of Washington for her M.S., and then moved to St. Louis, Missouri, where she pursued botanical studies, receiving her Ph.D. in 1923.

== Lichenology ==
Howard began teaching at Wellesley College in 1923, where she would remain for the next 28 years. She began to study lichens on the advice of Margaret Clay Ferguson of Wellesley College and Theodore Christian Frye of the University of Washington. Having grown up in Washington and graduated there, she was drawn to the study of that state's lichens in particular. She began collecting in the Washington in the summer of 1928, followed by a more extensive trip during the summer and fall of 1931, as well as during the summers of 1930, 1934, 1937, and 1938. Howard was promoted from assistant professor to associate professor of botany in 1938. In 1940, on a sabbatical year from Wellesley, she made a further significant trip, followed by additional collections in the summer of 1942.

In a 'Preliminary Report on the Lichens of the State of Washington' (1937), Howard reviewed the work of earlier collectors in the state. In her major work, Lichens of the State of Washington (1950), she corrected her previous omission of the work of Wilhelm N. Suksdorf, who she credited with "an immense amount of collecting in Washington". She also noted the work of Alexander H. Smith, who collected in and near the Olympic National Park.

While at Wellesley, Howard was also the curator of the college's herbarium, directed by Harriet Creighton. She taught general botany, field botany, and plant pathology, while researching the taxonomy and morphology of lichens. She retired from Wellesley in 1952, after twenty-eight years of service as associate professor of botany, and was subsequently made a professor emeritus. Howard was thanked by Vernon Ahmadjian in his 1967 The Lichen Symbiosis, for having "helped remove some of the frustrations I felt as an undergraduate student trying to identify the lichens of Worcester County, Massachusetts".

== Death ==
Grace Elizabeth Howard died in 1978, and was buried in Sunset Hills Memorial Park, Bellevue, Washington.
