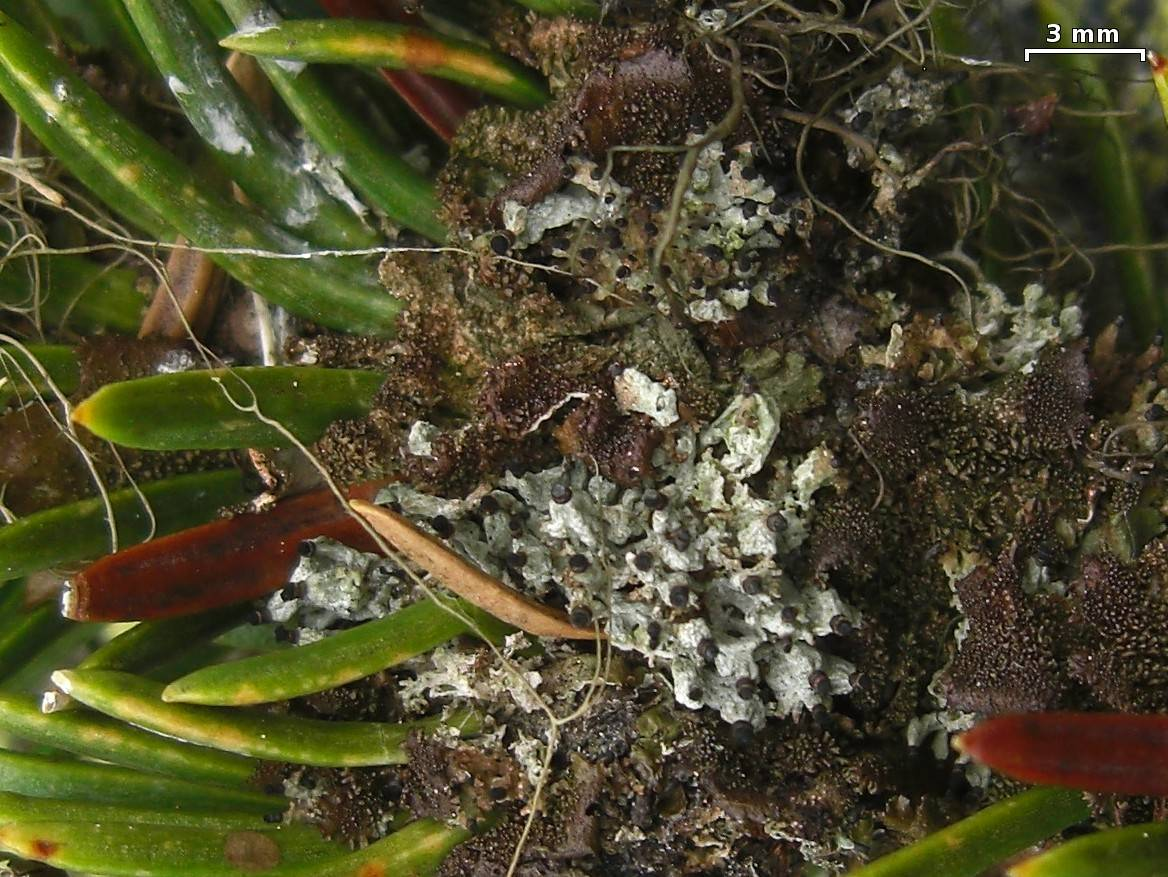
- in Wells Gray Provincial Park, British Columbia, Canada

Conservation status
- Apparently Secure (NatureServe)

Scientific classification
- Domain: Eukaryota
- Kingdom: Fungi
- Division: Ascomycota
- Class: Lecanoromycetes
- Order: Caliciales
- Family: Caliciaceae
- Genus: Tholurna; Norman (1861)
- Species: T. dissimilis

Binomial name
- Tholurna dissimilis (Norman) Norman (1861)

Synonyms
- Podocratera dissimilis Norman (1861)

= Tholurna =

Genus of fungi

Tholurna is a fungal genus in the family Caliciaceae. The genus is monotypic, containing the single species Tholurna dissimilis. Long thought to be confined to Scandinavia, it has since been recorded in western North America, where a 1983 survey documented 47 localities from coastal British Columbia to Oregon and as far north-east as the Yukon and Northwest Territories.

== Taxonomy ==
Tholurna dissimilis was first described by Johannes Musaeus Norman as Podocratera dissimilis in 1861; he circumscribed the new genus Tholurna the same year to contain the species. Norman's original description characterized Tholurna dissimilis as a Norwegian alpine lichen with a crustose thallus composed of granular-papillose squamules (scales) arranged in a cushion-like formation. He described the podetia (stalked reproductive structures) as simple, parabolic, and corrugated, with a dry, glaucous or brownish appearance and greenish colouration when moist. The apothecia (fruiting bodies) were noted as terminal, solitary, and having an urn-shaped to crater-like form with dark margins that dissolve into a black mass of spores when moistened. Norman distinguished the genus from related groups like Podocratera by its characteristic squamulose thallus structure, noting that while Nylander's methodology in his work Synopsis would place this species within Podocratera, the distinctive thallus warranted recognition of the separate genus Tholurna.

== Habitat and distribution ==
Although the lichen was once considered an alpine specialist, restricted to krummholz and other wind-shorn conifer tops near the tree line, fieldwork in the 1970s and early 1980s uncovered a far wider ecological range. A compilation of collections revealed populations on numerous mountain summits in the Coast and Cascade ranges, the Interior Mountains of British Columbia, and isolated peaks in the Yukon and Northwest Territories. Occurrences stretch roughly between latitudes 45° N and 62° N, with most sites clustered in moist montane to subalpine zones west of the continental divide. Two gatherings from Vancouver Island provided the first documented insular records for the genus in North America, demonstrating that oceanic influences do not preclude its establishment.

The species is epiphytic on the exposed branchlets and terminal cones of spruce and other conifers. While the majority of North-American specimens still come from elevations of 1,000–1,400 m (3,300–4,600 ft), George Otto reported a colony growing at roughly 400 m (1,300 ft) and, most unexpectedly, one thriving just 150 m (490 ft) above sea-level in the Kitimat Valley, where an emergent 40-metre (130 ft) Sitka spruce supported thousands of thalli outside the forest's aerodynamic boundary layer. These finds indicate that the lichen's key requirement is not altitude per se but an open, wind-swept microclimate that mimics alpine exposure—conditions met equally on mountain ridges and on tall, isolated trees in humid coastal lowlands.
