= Crozier (mycology) =

Anatomic feature in ascomycete fungi

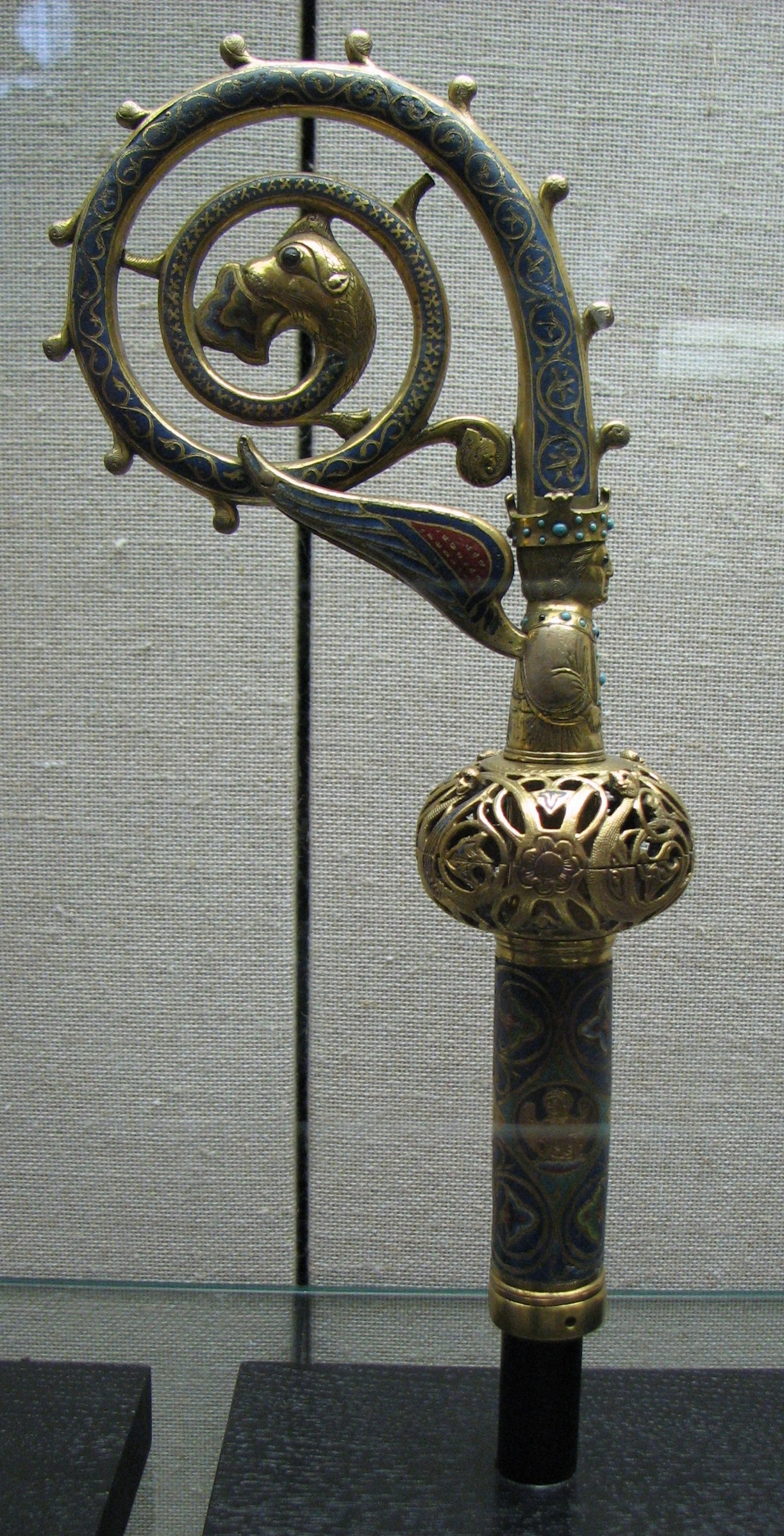
Christian crosier (1260-1286) of the form that is the name-sake of the fungal structure.

A crozier is an anatomical feature of many fungi in the phylum Ascomycota that forms at the base of asci and looks like a hook-topped shepherd’s staff or stylized religious crosier. Croziers resemble and function similarly to clamp connections on the dikaryotic hyphae of Basidiomycota.

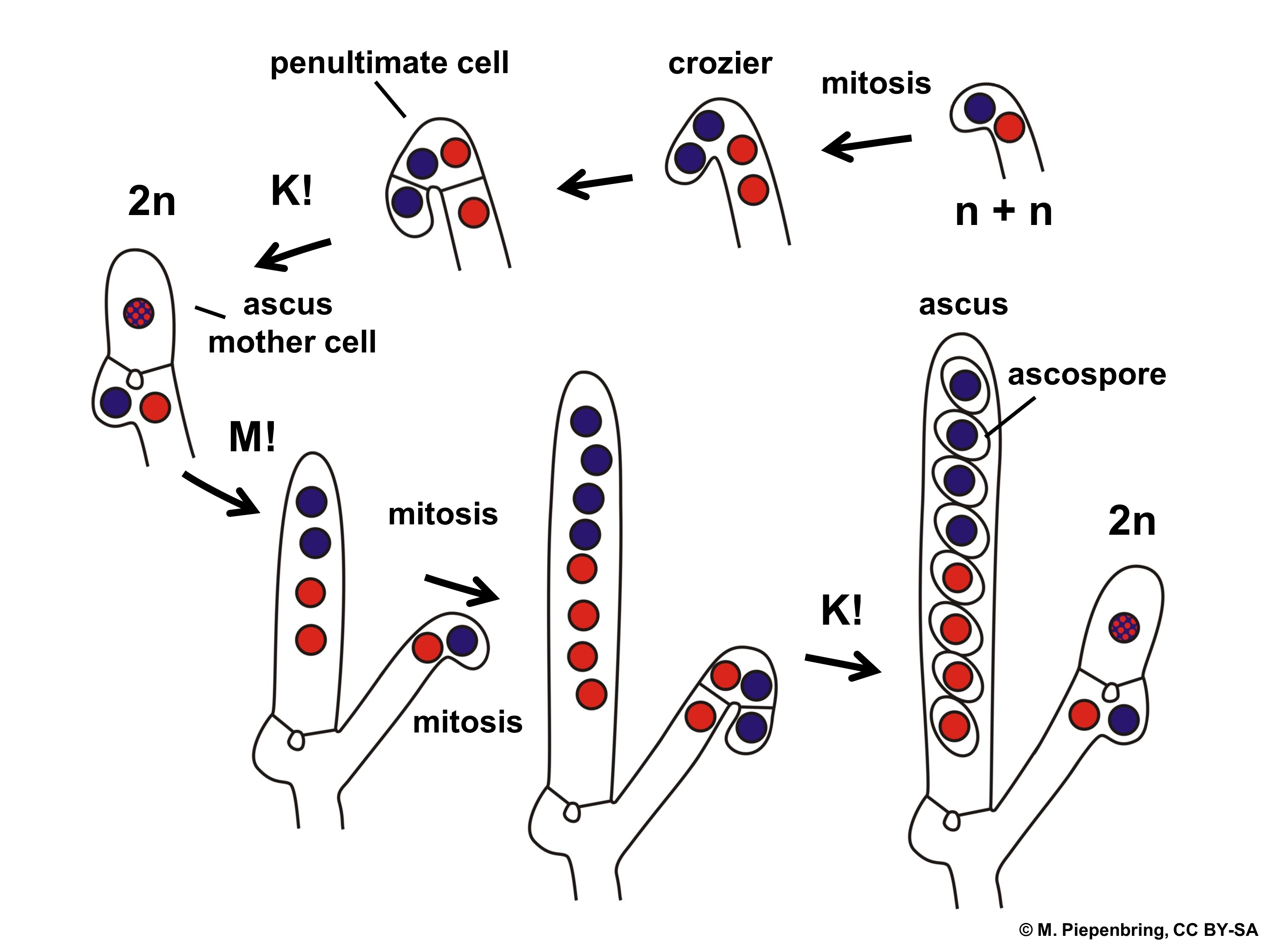
Two rounds of crozier formation, with establishment of a protruding ascus after karyogamy, meiosis and mitosis occur in the penultimate cell

During initial ascus formation in Ascomycota fruitbodies, the crozier helps to maintain the dikaryotic state of both the ascus itself and of the side branch that will continue propagation of the ascogenous hyphae. The tips of developing asci on these ascogenous hyphae curl over. One haploid nucleus migrates into the curved tip while the other compatible haploid nucleus remains in the penultimate space below the hook. The ascus itself forms as a radiating spur branch at the top of the hook. Each nucleus divides, resulting in the formation of a pair of compatible nuclei, i.e. a dikaryon, in the ascus, which is now the penultimate space. Two sister nuclei remain, one in the basal cell and the other in the crozier tip.

The tip of the crozier then fuses with the basal cell and walls itself off from the ascus by the formation of a septum. The nucleus from the crozier migrates into the basal cell where the other nucleus remains, thus maintaining a dikaryotic state. Below the base of the ascus, these nuclei migrate together into a growing side branch which is capable of repeating the ascus-crozier formation process indefinitely. Mature croziers are detectable through microscopic examination of mature asci as small, curved bridges at the basal septa. A significant minority of Ascomycota lack croziers, hence the presence or absence of croziers is an important taxonomic character.
