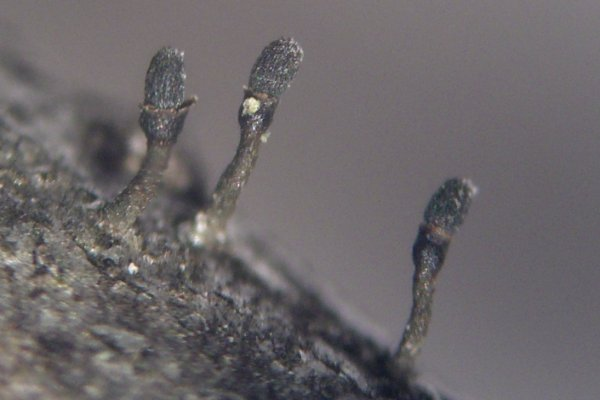
- The shrub stubble lichen (Allocalicium adaequatum)

Scientific classification
- Kingdom: Fungi
- Division: Ascomycota
- Class: Lecanoromycetes
- Subclass: Lecanoromycetidae
- Order: Caliciales; Bessey (1907)

Families
- Caliciaceae; Physciaceae

= Caliciales =

Order of fungi

Caliciales is an order of mostly lichenized fungi in the class Lecanoromycetes. It consists of two families: Caliciaceae and Physciaceae, which together contain 54 genera and more than 1200 species. The order was circumscribed by American botanist Charles Edwin Bessey in 1907.

== Families and genera ==
As of October 2022, Species Fungorum (in the Catalogue of Life) accepts 2 families, 56 genera, and 910 species in the Caliciales.

- Caliciaceae Chevall. (1826)

Acolium – 5 spp.
Acroscyphus – 1 sp.
Allocalicium – 1 sp.
Amandinea – 83 spp.
Australiaena – 1 sp.
Baculifera – 18 spp.
Buellia – 201 spp.
Calicium – 36 spp.
Chrismofulvea – 3 spp.
Ciposia – 1 sp.
Cratiria – 23 spp.
Dermatiscum – 2 sp.
Dermiscellum – 1 sp.
Dimelaena – 10 spp.
Diploicia – 6 spp.
Diplotomma – 12 spp.
Dirinaria – 18 spp.
Endohyalina – 10 sp.
Fluctua – 1 sp.
Gassicurtia – 30 spp.
Hafellia – 13 spp.
Hypoflavia – 3 spp.
Monerolechia – 5 spp.
Orcularia – 3 spp.
Pseudothelomma – 2 spp.
Pyxine – 44 spp.
Redonia – 1 sp.
Santessonia – 3 sp.
Sculptolumina – 5 spp.
Sphinctrinopsis – 1 sp.
Stigmatochroma – 8 spp.
Tetramelas – 31 spp.
Texosporium – 1 sp.
Thelomma – 2 spp.
Tholurna – 1 sp.
Tylophoropsis – 1 sp.

- Physciaceae Zahlbr. (1898)

Anaptychia – 5 spp.
Awasthia – 1 sp.
Coscinocladium – 2 spp.
Culbersonia – 1 sp.
Heterodermia – 49 spp.
Hyperphyscia – 7 spp.
Kashiwadia – 1 sp.
Leucodermia – 11 spp.
Mobergia – 1 sp.
Oxnerella – 1 sp.
Phaeophyscia – 22 spp.
Phaeorrhiza – 1 sp.
Physcia – 43 spp.
Physciella – 4 spp.
Physconia – 15 spp.
Polyblastidium – 18 spp.
Rinodina – 132 spp.
Rinodinella – 3 spp.
Tornabea – 1 sp.
