= Termenevo =

Termenevo Терменево
- Selo
- Location within Bashkortostan Location within Russia
- Coordinates: 55°04′N 58°38′E
- Country: Russia
- Region: Bashkortostan
- District: Salavatsky District
- Time zone: UTC+5:00

Termenevo (Russian: Терменево; Bashkir: Тирмән, Tirmän) is a rural locality (a selo) and the administrative centre of Termenevsky Selsoviet, Salavatsky District, Bashkortostan, Russia. The population was 774 as of 2010. There are 10 streets.

== Geography ==
Termenevo is located 55 km southeast of Maloyaz (the district's administrative centre) by road. Svoboda is the nearest rural locality.
