= Sharyakovo =

Sharyakovo Шаряково
- Village
- Location within Bashkortostan Location within Russia
- Coordinates: 55°14′N 58°28′E
- Country: Russia
- Region: Bashkortostan
- District: Salavatsky District
- Time zone: UTC+5:00

Sharyakovo (Russian: Шаряково; Bashkir: Шәрәк, Şäräk) is a rural locality (a village) in Lagerevsky Selsoviet, Salavatsky District, Bashkortostan, Russia. The population was 170 as of 2010. There are 3 streets.

== Geography ==
Sharyakovo is located 35 km northeast of Maloyaz (the district's administrative centre) by road. Lagerevo is the nearest rural locality.
