= Urmanchino =

Urmanchino Урманчино
- Village
- Location within Bashkortostan Location within Russia
- Coordinates: 55°08′N 58°31′E
- Country: Russia
- Region: Bashkortostan
- District: Salavatsky District
- Time zone: UTC+5:00

Urmanchino (Russian: Урманчино; Bashkir: Урмансы, Urmansı) is a rural locality (a village) in Laklinsky Selsoviet, Salavatsky District, Bashkortostan, Russia. The population was 405 as of 2010. There are 7 streets.

== Geography ==
Urmanchino is located 32 km east of Maloyaz (the district's administrative centre) by road. Russkoye Ilchikeyevo is the nearest rural locality.
