= Nasibash =

Nasibash Насибаш
- Selo
- Location within Bashkortostan Location within Russia
- Coordinates: 55°09′N 58°19′E
- Country: Russia
- Region: Bashkortostan
- District: Salavatsky District
- Time zone: UTC+5:00

Nasibash (Russian: Насибаш; Bashkir: Нәсибаш, Näsibaş) is a rural locality (a selo) and the administrative centre of Nasibashevsky Selsoviet, Salavatsky District, Bashkortostan, Russia. The population was 951 as of 2010. There are 7 streets.

== Geography ==
Nasibash is located 15 km east of Maloyaz (the district's administrative centre) by road. Kalmaklarovo is the nearest rural locality.
