= Idrisovo, Salavatsky District, Republic of Bashkortostan =

Idrisovo Идрисово
- Village
- Location within Bashkortostan Location within Russia
- Coordinates: 55°03′N 58°07′E
- Country: Russia
- Region: Bashkortostan
- District: Salavatsky District
- Time zone: UTC+5:00

Idrisovo (Russian: Идрисово; Bashkir: Иҙрис, İźris) is a rural locality (a village) in Alkinsky Selsoviet, Salavatsky District, Bashkortostan, Russia. The population was 151 as of 2010. There are 6 streets.

== Geography ==
Idrisovo is located 21 km south of Maloyaz (the district's administrative centre) by road. Yunusovo is the nearest rural locality.
