= Ustyatavka =

Ustyatavka Устьатавка
- Village
- Location within Bashkortostan Location within Russia
- Coordinates: 55°28′N 57°43′E
- Country: Russia
- Region: Bashkortostan
- District: Salavatsky District
- Time zone: UTC+5:00

Ustyatavka (Russian: Устьатавка; Bashkir: Атаутамаҡ, Atawtamaq) is a rural locality (a village) in Taymeyevsky Selsoviet, Salavatsky District, Bashkortostan, Russia. The population was 136 as of 2010. There are 2 streets.

== Geography ==
Ustyatavka is located 51 km northwest of Maloyaz (the district's administrative centre) by road. Urmantau is the nearest rural locality.
