= Kyzyrbak =

Kyzyrbak Кызырбак
- Village
- Location within Bashkortostan Location within Russia
- Coordinates: 55°12′N 58°12′E
- Country: Russia
- Region: Bashkortostan
- District: Salavatsky District
- Time zone: UTC+5:00

Kyzyrbak (Russian: Кызырбак; Bashkir: Ҡыҙырбаҡ, Qıźırbaq) is a rural locality (a village) in Salavatsky Selsoviet, Salavatsky District, Bashkortostan, Russia. The population was 11 as of 2010. There are 2 streets.

== Geography ==
Kyzyrbak is located 14 km northeast of Maloyaz (the district's administrative centre) by road. Kalmaklarovo is the nearest rural locality.
