= Yazgi-Yurt =

Yazgi-Yurt Язги-Юрт
- Village
- Location within Bashkortostan Location within Russia
- Coordinates: 55°16′N 58°21′E
- Country: Russia
- Region: Bashkortostan
- District: Salavatsky District
- Time zone: UTC+5:00

Yazgi-Yurt (Russian: Язги-Юрт; Bashkir: Яҙғыйорт, Yaźğıyort) is a rural locality (a village) in Lagerevsky Selsoviet, Salavatsky District, Bashkortostan, Russia. The population was 259 as of 2010. There are 2 streets.

== Geography ==
Yazgi-Yurt is located 42 km northeast of Maloyaz (the district's administrative centre) by road. Lagerevo is the nearest rural locality.
