= Tatarsky Maloyaz =

Tatarsky Maloyaz Татарский Малояз
- Selo
- Location within Bashkortostan Location within Russia
- Coordinates: 55°12′N 58°09′E
- Country: Russia
- Region: Bashkortostan
- District: Salavatsky District
- Time zone: UTC+5:00

Tatarsky Maloyaz (Russian: Татарский Малояз; Bashkir: Татар Малаяҙы, Tatar Malayaźı) is a rural locality (a selo) and the administrative centre of Maloyazovsky Selsoviet, Salavatsky District, Bashkortostan, Russia. The population was 586 as of 2010. There are 10 streets.

== Geography ==
Tatarsky Maloyaz is located 4 km north of Maloyaz (the district's administrative centre) by road. Maloyaz is the nearest rural locality.
