= Mindishevo =

Mindishevo Миндишево
- Village
- Location within Bashkortostan Location within Russia
- Coordinates: 54°56′N 57°58′E
- Country: Russia
- Region: Bashkortostan
- District: Salavatsky District
- Time zone: UTC+5:00

Mindishevo (Russian: Миндишево; Bashkir: Миндеш, Mindeş) is a rural locality (a village) in Ishimbayevsky Selsoviet, Salavatsky District, Bashkortostan, Russia. The population was 304 as of 2010. There are 6 streets.

== Geography ==
Mindishevo is located 39 km southwest of Maloyaz (the district's administrative centre) by road. Ishimbayevo is the nearest rural locality.
