= Radio, Salavatsky District, Republic of Bashkortostan =

Radio Радио
- Village
- Location within Bashkortostan Location within Russia
- Coordinates: 54°58′N 58°03′E
- Country: Russia
- Region: Bashkortostan
- District: Salavatsky District
- Time zone: UTC+5:00

Radio (Russian: Радио) is a rural locality (a village) in Ishimbayevsky Selsoviet, Salavatsky District, Bashkortostan, Russia. The population was 129 as of 2010. There are 4 streets.

== Geography ==
Radio is located 31 km south of Maloyaz (the district's administrative centre) by road. Yakhya is the nearest rural locality.
