= Kuselyarovo =

Kuselyarovo Куселярово
- Village
- Location within Bashkortostan Location within Russia
- Coordinates: 55°23′N 57°52′E
- Country: Russia
- Region: Bashkortostan
- District: Salavatsky District
- Time zone: UTC+5:00

Kuselyarovo (Russian: Куселярово; Bashkir: Күҫәләр, Küśälär) is a rural locality (a village) in Arkaulovsky Selsoviet, Salavatsky District, Bashkortostan, Russia. The population was 171 as of 2010. There are 4 streets.

== Geography ==
Kuselyarovo is located 38 km northwest of Maloyaz (the district's administrative centre) by road. Makhmutovo is the nearest rural locality.
