= Bash-Ilchikeyevo =

Bash-Ilchikeyevo Баш-Ильчикеево
- Village
- Location within Bashkortostan Location within Russia
- Coordinates: 55°04′N 58°28′E
- Country: Russia
- Region: Bashkortostan
- District: Salavatsky District
- Time zone: UTC+5:00

Bash-Ilchikeyevo (Russian: Баш-Ильчикеево; Bashkir: Башҡорт Илсекәйе, Başqort İlsekäye) is a rural locality (a village) in Meshchegarovsky Selsoviet, Salavatsky District, Bashkortostan, Russia. The population was 337 as of 2010. There are 6 streets.

== Geography ==
Bash-Ilchikeyevo is located 40 km southeast of Maloyaz (the district's administrative centre) by road. Russkoye Ilchikeyevo is the nearest rural locality.
