= Musatovo =

Musatovo Мусатово
- Village
- Location within Bashkortostan Location within Russia
- Coordinates: 55°14′N 58°12′E
- Country: Russia
- Region: Bashkortostan
- District: Salavatsky District
- Time zone: UTC+5:00

Musatovo (Russian: Мусатово; Bashkir: Мөсәт, Mösät) is a rural locality (a village) in Yangatausky Selsoviet, Salavatsky District, Bashkortostan, Russia. The population was 71 as of 2010. There are 4 streets.

== Geography ==
Musatovo is located 37 km north of Maloyaz (the district's administrative centre) by road. Urdaly is the nearest rural locality.
