= Bychkovka =

Bychkovka Бычковка
- Village
- Location within Bashkortostan Location within Russia
- Coordinates: 55°14′N 58°08′E
- Country: Russia
- Region: Bashkortostan
- District: Salavatsky District
- Time zone: UTC+5:00

Bychkovka (Russian: Бычковка) is a rural locality (a village) in Maloyazovsky Selsoviet, Salavatsky District, Bashkortostan, Russia. The population was 41 as of 2010. There is 1 street.

== Geography ==
Bychkovka is located 10 km north of Maloyaz (the district's administrative centre) by road. Gusevka is the nearest rural locality.
