= Mursalimkino =

Mursalimkino Мурсалимкино
- Selo
- Location within Bashkortostan Location within Russia
- Coordinates: 55°02′N 58°33′E
- Country: Russia
- Region: Bashkortostan
- District: Salavatsky District
- Time zone: UTC+5:00

Mursalimkino (Russian: Мурсалимкино; Bashkir: Мөрсәлим, Mörsälim) is a rural locality (a selo) and the administrative centre of Meshchegarovsky Selsoviet, Salavatsky District, Bashkortostan, Russia. The population was 2,203 as of 2010. There are 43 streets.

== Geography ==
Mursalimkino is located 49 km southeast of Maloyaz (the district's administrative centre) by road. Novosyuryukayevo is the nearest rural locality.
