= Yunusovo, Salavatsky District, Republic of Bashkortostan =

Yunusovo Юнусово
- Village
- Location within Bashkortostan Location within Russia
- Coordinates: 55°03′N 58°04′E
- Country: Russia
- Region: Bashkortostan
- District: Salavatsky District
- Time zone: UTC+5:00

Yunusovo (Russian: Юнусово; Bashkir: Йонос, Yonos) is a rural locality (a village) in Alkinsky Selsoviet, Salavatsky District, Bashkortostan, Russia. The population was 248 as of 2010. There are 5 streets.

The village is situated in a hilly area typical of the southern Ural region, with mixed forest and farmland surrounding it.

Local residents are mainly engaged in agriculture and livestock farming.

== Geography ==
Yunusovo is located 18 km southwest of Maloyaz (the district's administrative centre) by road. Idrisovo is the nearest rural locality.
