= Maloyaz =

Maloyaz (Russian: Малояз) is the name of several rural localities in Russia:

- Maloyaz, Republic of Bashkortostan, a selo in Salavatsky Selsoviet of Salavatsky District in the Republic of Bashkortostan
- Maloyaz, Chelyabinsk Oblast, a selo in Ileksky Selsoviet of Ashinsky District in Chelyabinsk Oblast
