= Komsomol, Salavatsky District, Republic of Bashkortostan =

Komsomol Комсомол
- Village
- Location within Bashkortostan Location within Russia
- Coordinates: 55°16′N 58°08′E
- Country: Russia
- Region: Bashkortostan
- District: Salavatsky District
- Time zone: UTC+5:00

Komsomol (Russian: Комсомол) is a rural locality (a village) in Yangatausky Selsoviet, Salavatsky District, Bashkortostan, Russia. The population was 221 as of 2010. There are 12 streets.

== Geography ==
Komsomol is located 13 km north of Maloyaz (the district's administrative centre) by road. Iltayevo is the nearest rural locality.
