= Lakly =

Lakly Лаклы
- Selo
- Location within Bashkortostan Location within Russia
- Coordinates: 55°11′N 58°32′E
- Country: Russia
- Region: Bashkortostan
- District: Salavatsky District
- Time zone: UTC+5:00

Lakly (Russian: Лаклы; Bashkir: Лаҡлы, Laqlı) is a rural locality (a selo) and the administrative centre of Laklinsky Selsoviet, Salavatsky District, Bashkortostan, Russia. The population was 925 as of 2010. There are 10 streets.

== Geography ==
Lakly is located 31 km east of Maloyaz (the district's administrative centre) by road. Yelanlino is the nearest rural locality.
