= Novosyuryukayevo =

Novosyuryukayevo Новосюрюкаево
- Village
- Location within Bashkortostan Location within Russia
- Coordinates: 55°02′N 58°36′E
- Country: Russia
- Region: Bashkortostan
- District: Salavatsky District
- Time zone: UTC+5:00

Novosyuryukayevo (Russian: Новосюрюкаево; Bashkir: Яңы Сүрәкәй, Yañı Süräkäy) is a rural locality (a village) in Meshchegarovsky Selsoviet, Salavatsky District, Bashkortostan, Russia. The population was 145 as of 2010. There are 3 streets.

== Geography ==
Novosyuryukayevo is located 54 km southeast of Maloyaz (the district's administrative centre) by road. Mursalimkino is the nearest rural locality.
