= Iltayevo =

Iltayevo Ильтаево
- Village
- Location within Bashkortostan Location within Russia
- Coordinates: 55°16′N 58°08′E
- Country: Russia
- Region: Bashkortostan
- District: Salavatsky District
- Time zone: UTC+5:00

Iltayevo (Russian: Ильтаево; Bashkir: Илтәй, İltäy) is a rural locality (a village) in Yangatausky Selsoviet, Salavatsky District, Bashkortostan, Russia. There are 2 streets.

== Demographics ==
The population was 153 as of 2010.

== Geography ==
Iltayevo is located 40 km north of Maloyaz (the district's administrative centre) by road. Komsomol is the nearest rural locality.
