= Sargamysh =

Sargamysh Саргамыш
- Village
- Location within Bashkortostan Location within Russia
- Coordinates: 55°24′N 58°06′E
- Country: Russia
- Region: Bashkortostan
- District: Salavatsky District
- Time zone: UTC+5:00

Sargamysh (Russian: Саргамыш; Bashkir: Һарғамыш, Harğamış) is a rural locality (a village) in Meshchegarovsky Selsoviet, Salavatsky District, Bashkortostan, Russia. The population was 256 as of 2010. There are 7 streets.

== Geography ==
Sargamysh is located 38 km north of Maloyaz (the district's administrative centre) by road. Meshchegarovo is the nearest rural locality.
