= Meshchegarovo =

Meshchegarovo Мещегарово
- Selo
- Location within Bashkortostan Location within Russia
- Coordinates: 55°25′N 58°12′E
- Country: Russia
- Region: Bashkortostan
- District: Salavatsky District
- Time zone: UTC+5:00

Meshchegarovo (Russian: Мещегарово; Bashkir: Миәшәгәр, Miäşägär) is a rural locality (a selo) and the administrative centre of Meshchegarovsky Selsoviet, Salavatsky District, Bashkortostan, Russia. The population was 534 as of 2010. There are 8 streets.

== Geography ==
Meshchegarovo is located 45 km north of Maloyaz (the district's administrative centre) by road. Yelanysh is the nearest rural locality.
