= Yaubulyakovo =

Yaubulyakovo Яубуляково
- Village
- Location within Bashkortostan Location within Russia
- Coordinates: 55°22′N 57°57′E
- Country: Russia
- Region: Bashkortostan
- District: Salavatsky District
- Time zone: UTC+5:00

Yaubulyakovo (Russian: Яубуляково; Bashkir: Яубүләк, Yawbüläk) is a rural locality (a village) in Arkaulovsky Selsoviet, Salavatsky District, Bashkortostan, Russia. The population was 26 as of 2010. There is 1 street.

== Geography ==
Yaubulyakovo is located 31 km north of Maloyaz (the district's administrative centre) by road. Beshevlyarovo is the nearest rural locality.
