= Tetramelas phaeophysciae =

Scientific classification
- Kingdom: Fungi
- Division: Ascomycota
- Class: Lecanoromycetes
- Order: Caliciales
- Family: Caliciaceae
- Genus: Tetramelas
- Species: T. phaeophysciae

Binomial name
- Tetramelas phaeophysciae A.Nordin & Tibell (2005)
- Type locality: Vilasund, Sweden

Species of lichen-forming fungus

Tetramelas phaeophysciae is a species of lichen-forming fungus in the family Caliciaceae. It is a lichenicolous (lichen-dwelling) species that grows on other lichens, primarily Phaeophyscia and Physcia species. Found in arctic to subalpine climates, records are documented from Scandinavia, Greenland, Iceland, and parts of central and northern Asia. The species was described in 2005 after DNA evidence showed it was distinct from the closely related Tetramelas pulverulentus.

== Taxonomy ==
Tetramelas phaeophysciae was described as a new species by Anders Nordin and Leif Tibell in 2005, after they re-examined Scandinavian material that had previously been treated under Buellia pulverulenta in earlier work. Their study found that specimens occurring on Phaeophyscia hosts consistently differed from typical B. pulverulenta in ascospore characters and in the look of the apothecia, prompting a closer review of older collections and newly gathered material. The original type material was collected by Gustaf Einar Du Rietz on 29 August 1963.

To test whether the suspected distinct species was genuinely distinct, the authors analysed fungal internal transcribed spacer (ITS) rDNA sequences. The results placed the new species as a close relative of B. pulverulenta within the Tetramelas clade (rather than in Diplotomma as had been suggested elsewhere), supporting recognition at species rank and placement in Tetramelas. The type collection is from northern Sweden (Lycksele Lappmark, Tärna parish), where it was found growing on the thallus and apothecia of Phaeophyscia endococcina on lakeshore rocks.

== Description ==
Tetramelas phaeophysciae is an obligately lichenicolous lichen-forming fungus—meaning it lives on other lichens—developing its own body (thallus) mainly as a network of hyphae within the host thallus. The apothecia are small (about 0.10–0.55 mm across), typically scattered to abundant on the host thallus or directly on the host's apothecia. They are sessile, with discs that are initially urn-shaped and later flatten to convex. The margin is often distinct, although it can become excluded as the apothecia become strongly convex.

Microscopically, the hymenium is about 50–70 μm tall, with asci roughly 43–50 × 12–20 μm. Paraphyses (sterile filaments) have broadened tips (about 4–6 μm) with distinct apical caps. The ascospores are ellipsoid and consistently 1-septate, usually slightly curved, measuring about 16.5–22 × 6.5–9 μm. The outer spore wall (perispore) is finely wrinkled (rugulate) and only slightly thinner than the main wall. Pycnidia were not observed, and thin-layer chromatography detected no secondary metabolites (spot tests K, P, and C negative).

== Habitat and distribution ==
The species is known from arctic to subalpine parts of Greenland, Iceland, Norway, and Sweden. It grows within the thalli of Phaeophyscia and Physcia species that occur on rocks (and more rarely on soil), and it has most often been collected in damp settings such as riverbanks and lake shores. Its known range has since increased with records from Hungary, Mongolia, Svalbard, and the Kodar Mountains in the Transbaikal region of Siberia.

Among recorded hosts, Phaeophyscia sciastra is the most frequent, followed by Physcia caesia; other reported hosts include Phaeophyscia endococcina, Physcia dubia, and Physcia tenella. In the original account, Nordin and Tibell contrasted it with the closely related Tetramelas pulverulentus (the recombined Buellia pulverulenta), which is associated with Physconia hosts rather than Phaeophyscia—though both species can occur on Physcia.
