= Russkoye Ilchikeyevo =

Russkoye Ilchikeyevo Русское Ильчикеево
- Village
- Location within Bashkortostan Location within Russia
- Coordinates: 55°06′N 58°28′E
- Country: Russia
- Region: Bashkortostan
- District: Salavatsky District
- Time zone: UTC+5:00

Russkoye Ilchikeyevo (Russian: Русское Ильчикеево; Bashkir: Урыҫ Илсекөйе, Urıś İlsekäye) is a rural locality (a village) in Meshchegarovsky Selsoviet, Salavatsky District, Bashkortostan, Russia. The population was 108 as of 2010. There are 2 streets.

== Geography ==
Russkoye Ilchikeyevo is located 36 km southeast of Maloyaz (the district's administrative centre) by road. Bash-Ilchikeyevo is the nearest rural locality.
