= 1st Idelbaevo =

1st Idelbaevo 1-е Идельбаево 1-се Иҙелбай 1-se İźelbay
- Village
- Location in Bashkortostan
- Coordinates: 55.422°N 57.813°E
- Country: Russia
- Region: Bashkortostan
- District: Salavatsky District
- Time zone: UTC+05:00

1st Idelbaevo (Russian: 1-е Идельбаево; Bashkir: 1-се Иҙелбай, 1-se İźelbay) is a rural locality (a village) in Taymeyevskoye Rural Settlement of Salavatsky District, Bashkortostan, Russia. The population was 108 as of 2010.

== Geography ==
1st Idelbaevo is located 45 km northwest of Maloyaz (the district's administrative centre) by road. 2nd Idelbayevo is the nearest rural locality.

== Ethnicity ==
The village is inhabited by Bashkirs.

== Streets ==
- Naberezhnaya
- Tsentralnaya
- Shkolnaya

== Famous people ==
- Mazgar Abdullin - Bashkir writer and journalist was born in this village.
