= Tashaulovo =

Tashaulovo Ташаулово
- Village
- Location within Bashkortostan Location within Russia
- Coordinates: 55°29′N 57°42′E
- Country: Russia
- Region: Bashkortostan
- District: Salavatsky District
- Time zone: UTC+5:00

Tashaulovo (Russian: Ташаулово; Bashkir: Ташауыл, Taşawıl) is a rural locality (a village) in Taymeyevsky Selsoviet, Salavatsky District, Bashkortostan, Russia. The population was 187 as of 2010. There are 3 streets.

== Geography ==
Tashaulovo is located 54 km northwest of Maloyaz (the district's administrative centre) by road. Urmantau is the nearest rural locality.
