= Yakhya =

Yakhya Яхъя
- Village
- Location within Bashkortostan Location within Russia
- Coordinates: 54°58′N 58°04′E
- Country: Russia
- Region: Bashkortostan
- District: Salavatsky District
- Time zone: UTC+5:00

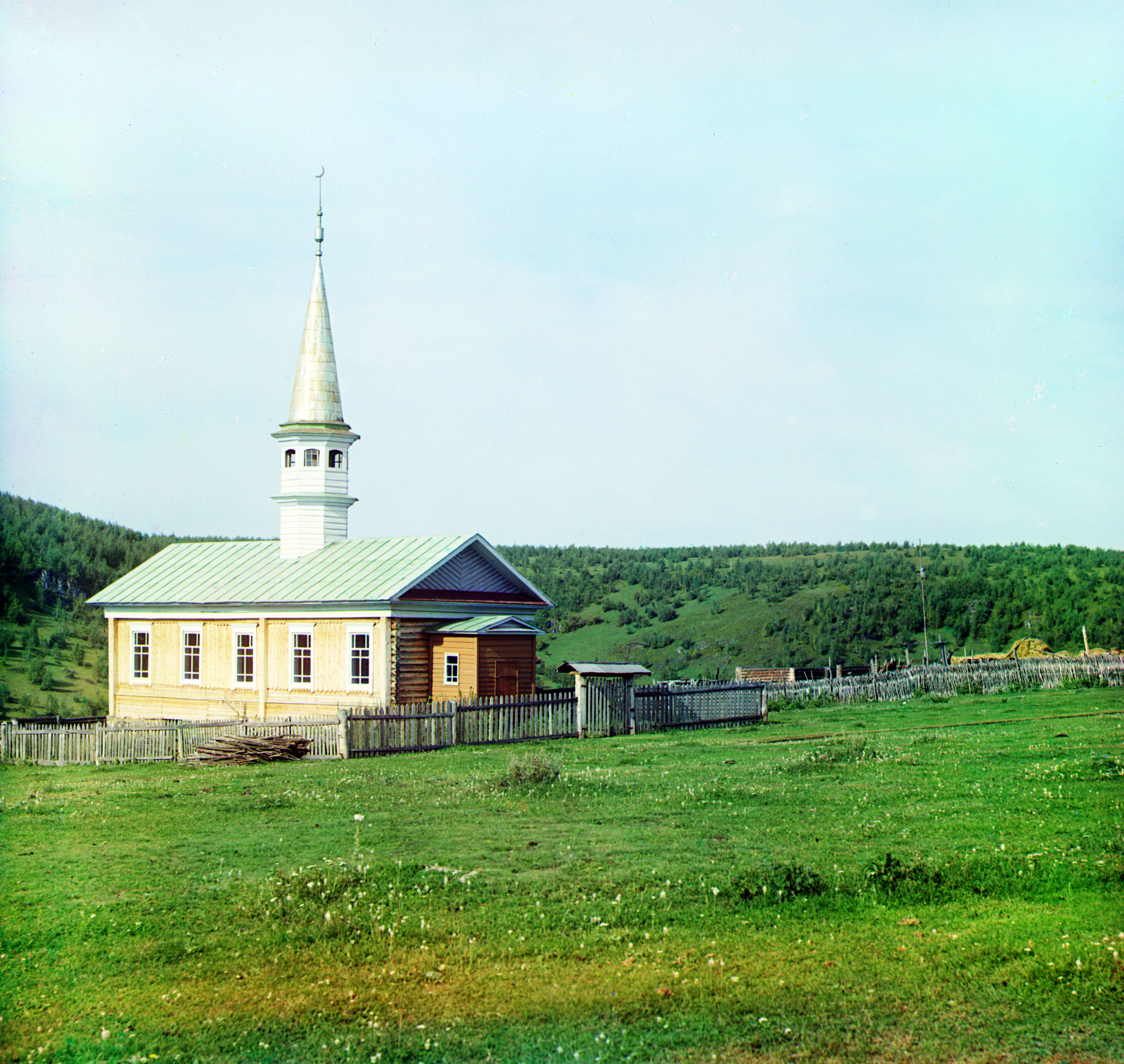
Mosque in the Bashkir village of Ekh'ia

Yakhya (Russian: Яхъя; Bashkir: Яхъя, Yaxya) is a rural locality (a village) in Ishimbayevsky Selsoviet, Salavatsky District, Bashkortostan, Russia. The population was 333 as of 2010. There are 7 streets.

== Geography ==
Yakhya is located 30 km south of Maloyaz (the district's administrative centre) by road. Radio is the nearest rural locality.
