= Urdaly =

Urdaly Урдалы
- Village
- Location within Bashkortostan Location within Russia
- Coordinates: 55°15′N 58°12′E
- Country: Russia
- Region: Bashkortostan
- District: Salavatsky District
- Time zone: UTC+5:00

Urdaly (Russian: Урдалы; Bashkir: Урҙалы, Urźalı) is a rural locality (a village) in Yangatausky Selsoviet, Salavatsky District, Bashkortostan, Russia. The population was 20 as of 2010. There is 1 street.

== Geography ==
Urdaly is located 36 km north of Maloyaz (the district's administrative centre) by road. Musatovo is the nearest rural locality.
