= 2nd Idelbaevo =

2nd Idelbaevo 2-е Идельбаево 2-се Иҙелбай
- Village
- Location within Bashkortostan Location within Russia
- Coordinates: 55.411111°N 57.8275°E
- Country: Russia
- Region: Bashkortostan
- District: Salavatsky District
- Time zone: UTC+05:00

2nd Idelbaevo (Russian: 2-е Идельбаево; Bashkir: 2-се Иҙелбай, 2-se İźelbay) is a rural locality (a village) in Taymeyevsky Selsoviet of Salavatsky District, Russia. The population was 328 as of 2010.

== Geography ==
2nd Idelbaevo is located 45 km northwest of Maloyaz (the district's administrative centre) by road. 1st Idelbayevo is the nearest rural locality.

== Ethnicity ==
The village is inhabited by Bashkirs.

== Streets ==
- Zelenaya
- Molodezhnaya
- Naberezhnaya
- Tsentralnaya
- Shkolnaya
