= Beshevlyarovo =

Beshevlyarovo Бешевлярово
- Village
- Location within Bashkortostan Location within Russia
- Coordinates: 55°22′N 57°57′E
- Country: Russia
- Region: Bashkortostan
- District: Salavatsky District
- Time zone: UTC+5:00

Beshevlyarovo (Russian: Бешевлярово; Bashkir: Бишәүҙәр, Bişäwźär) is a rural locality (a village) in Arkaulovsky Selsoviet, Salavatsky District, Bashkortostan, Russia. The population was 220 as of 2010. There are 5 streets.

== Geography ==
Beshevlyarovo is located 31 km northwest of Maloyaz (the district's administrative centre) by road. Arkaulovo is the nearest rural locality.
