= Makhmutovo, Salavatsky District, Republic of Bashkortostan =

Makhmutovo Махмутово
- Village
- Location within Bashkortostan Location within Russia
- Coordinates: 55°24′N 57°52′E
- Country: Russia
- Region: Bashkortostan
- District: Salavatsky District
- Time zone: UTC+5:00

Makhmutovo (Russian: Махмутово; Bashkir: Мәхмүт, Mäxmüt) is a rural locality (a village) in Arkaulovsky Selsoviet, Salavatsky District, Bashkortostan, Russia. The population was 100 as of 2010. There are 2 streets.

== Geography ==
Makhmutovo is located 38 km northwest of Maloyaz (the district's administrative centre) by road. Arkaulovo is the nearest rural locality.
