= Svoboda, Salavatsky District, Republic of Bashkortostan =

Svoboda Свобода
- Village
- Location within Bashkortostan Location within Russia
- Coordinates: 55°04′N 58°37′E
- Country: Russia
- Region: Bashkortostan
- District: Salavatsky District
- Time zone: UTC+5:00

Svoboda (Russian: Свобода) is a rural locality (a village) in Termenevsky Selsoviet, Salavatsky District, Bashkortostan, Russia. The population was 102 as of 2010. There is 1 street.

== Geography ==
Svoboda is located 57 km southeast of Maloyaz (the district's administrative centre) by road. Termenevo is the nearest rural locality.
