= Ayskaya =

Ayskaya Айская
- Village
- Location within Bashkortostan Location within Russia
- Coordinates: 55°23′N 58°22′E
- Country: Russia
- Region: Bashkortostan
- District: Salavatsky District
- Time zone: UTC+5:00

Ayskaya (Russian: Айская; Bashkir: Әй, Äy) is a rural locality (a village) in Turnalinsky Selsoviet, Salavatsky District, Bashkortostan, Russia. The population was 207 as of 2010. There are 3 streets.

== Geography ==
Ayskaya is located 38 km northeast of Maloyaz (the district's administrative centre) by road. Turnally and Kadyrovo are the nearest rural localities.
