= Kalmaklarovo =

Kalmaklarovo Калмакларово
- Village
- Location within Bashkortostan Location within Russia
- Coordinates: 55°10′N 58°11′E
- Country: Russia
- Region: Bashkortostan
- District: Salavatsky District
- Time zone: UTC+5:00

Kalmaklarovo (Russian: Калмакларово; Bashkir: Ҡалмаҡтар, Qalmaqtar) is a rural locality (a village) in Salavatsky Selsoviet, Salavatsky District, Bashkortostan, Russia. The population was 208 as of 2010. There are 5 streets.

== Geography ==
Kalmaklarovo is located 8 km southeast of Maloyaz (the district's administrative centre) by road. Maloyaz is the nearest rural locality.
