= Yelanysh, Salavatsky District, Republic of Bashkortostan =

Yelanysh Еланыш
- Selo
- Location within Bashkortostan Location within Russia
- Coordinates: 55°23′N 58°14′E
- Country: Russia
- Region: Bashkortostan
- District: Salavatsky District
- Time zone: UTC+5:00

Yelanysh (Russian: Еланыш; Bashkir: Йыланыш, Yılanış) is a rural locality (a selo) in Meshchegarovsky Selsoviet, Salavatsky District, Bashkortostan, Russia. The population was 343 as of 2010. There are 7 streets.

== Geography ==
Yelanysh is located 30 km north of Maloyaz (the district's administrative centre) by road. Kadyrovo is the nearest rural locality.
