= Lagerevo =

Lagerevo Лагерево
- Selo
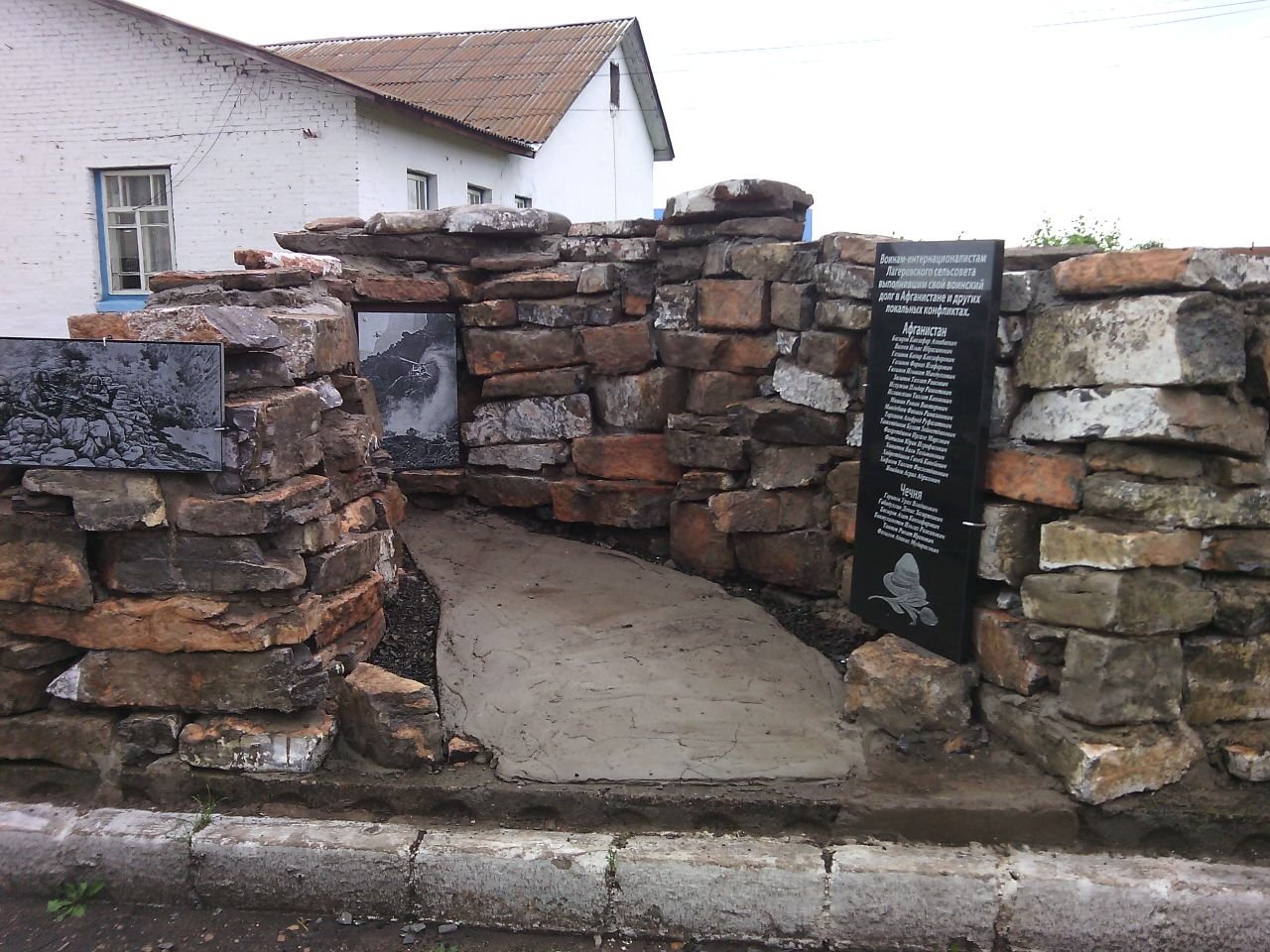

- Location within Bashkortostan Location within Russia
- Coordinates: 55°15′N 58°26′E
- Country: Russia
- Region: Bashkortostan
- District: Salavatsky District
- Time zone: UTC+5:00

Lagerevo (Russian: Лагерево; Bashkir: Лағыр, Lağır) is a rural locality (a selo) and the administrative centre of Lagerevsky Selsoviet, Salavatsky District, Bashkortostan, Russia. The population was 856 as of 2010. There are 10 streets.

== Geography ==
Lagerevo is located 37 km northeast of Maloyaz (the district's administrative centre) by road. Sharyakovo is the nearest rural locality.
