= Novyye Kartavly =

Novyye Kartavly Новые Каратавлы
- Village
- Location within Bashkortostan Location within Russia
- Coordinates: 55°08′N 58°08′E
- Country: Russia
- Region: Bashkortostan
- District: Salavatsky District
- Time zone: UTC+5:00

Novyye Kartavly (Russian: Новые Каратавлы; Bashkir: Яңы Ҡаратаулы, Yañı Qaratawlı) is a rural locality (a village) in Alkinsky Selsoviet, Salavatsky District, Bashkortostan, Russia. The population was 364 as of 2010. There are 9 streets.

== Geography ==
Novyye Kartavly is located 6 km south of Maloyaz (the district's administrative centre) by road. Maloyaz is the nearest rural locality.
