= Karagulovo =

Karagulovo Карагулово
- Village
- Location within Bashkortostan Location within Russia
- Coordinates: 55°01′N 58°29′E
- Country: Russia
- Region: Bashkortostan
- District: Salavatsky District
- Time zone: UTC+5:00

Karagulovo (Russian: Карагулово; Bashkir: Ҡарағол, Qarağol) is a rural locality (a village) in Meshchegarovsky Selsoviet, Salavatsky District, Bashkortostan, Russia. The population was 231 as of 2010. There are 4 streets.

== Geography ==
Karagulovo is located 52 km southeast of Maloyaz (the district's administrative centre) by road. Mursalimkino is the nearest rural locality.
