= Pervomaysky, Salavatsky District, Republic of Bashkortostan =

Pervomaysky Первомайский
- Selo
- Location within Bashkortostan Location within Russia
- Coordinates: 55°05′N 58°42′E
- Country: Russia
- Region: Bashkortostan
- District: Salavatsky District
- Time zone: UTC+5:00

Pervomaysky (Russian: Первомайский) is a rural locality (a selo) and the administrative centre of Pervomaysky Selsoviet, Salavatsky District, Bashkortostan, Russia. The population was 395 as of 2010. There are 11 streets.

== Geography ==
Pervomaysky is located 60 km southeast of Maloyaz (the district's administrative centre) by road. Pokrovka is the nearest rural locality.
