= Gusevka =

Gusevka Гусевка
- Selo
- Location within Bashkortostan Location within Russia
- Coordinates: 55°14′N 58°06′E
- Country: Russia
- Region: Bashkortostan
- District: Salavatsky District
- Time zone: UTC+5:00

Gusevka (Russian: Гусевка) is a rural locality (a selo) in Maloyazovsky Selsoviet, Salavatsky District, Bashkortostan, Russia. The population was 199 as of 2010. There are 3 streets.

== Geography ==
Gusevka is located 12 km northwest of Maloyaz (the district's administrative centre) by road. Pokrovka is the nearest rural locality.
