= Yelgildino =

Yelgildino Ельгильдино
- Village
- Location within Bashkortostan Location within Russia
- Coordinates: 55°19′N 58°19′E
- Country: Russia
- Region: Bashkortostan
- District: Salavatsky District
- Time zone: UTC+5:00

Yelgildino (Russian: Ельгильдино; Bashkir: Йылгилде, Yılgilde) is a rural locality (a village) in Turnalinsky Selsoviet, Salavatsky District, Bashkortostan, Russia. The population was 24 as of 2010. There is 1 street.

== Geography ==
Yelgildino is located 31 km northeast of Maloyaz (the district's administrative centre) by road. Yukalikulevo is the nearest rural locality.
