= Yulayevo, Salavatsky District, Republic of Bashkortostan =

Yulayevo Юлаево
- Village
- Location within Bashkortostan Location within Russia
- Coordinates: 55°07′N 58°00′E
- Country: Russia
- Region: Bashkortostan
- District: Salavatsky District
- Time zone: UTC+5:00

Yulayevo (Russian: Юлаево; Bashkir: Юлай, Yulay) is a rural locality (a village) in Alkinsky Selsoviet, Salavatsky District, Bashkortostan, Russia. The population was 123 as of 2010. There are 5 streets.

== Geography ==
Yulayevo is located 20 km southwest of Maloyaz (the district's administrative centre) by road. Muratovka is the nearest rural locality.
