= Sharipovo, Salavatsky District, Republic of Bashkortostan =

Sharipovo Шарипово
- Selo
- Location within Bashkortostan Location within Russia
- Coordinates: 55°26′N 58°10′E
- Country: Russia
- Region: Bashkortostan
- District: Salavatsky District
- Time zone: UTC+5:00

Sharipovo (Russian: Шарипово; Bashkir: Шәрип, Şärip) is a rural locality (a selo) in Meshchegarovsky Selsoviet, Salavatsky District, Bashkortostan, Russia. The population was 420 as of 2010. There are 4 streets.

== Geography ==
Sharipovo is located 44 km north of Maloyaz (the district's administrative centre) by road. Meshchegarovo is the nearest rural locality.
