= Turnaly =

Turnaly Турналы
- Selo
- Location within Bashkortostan Location within Russia
- Coordinates: 55°20′N 58°16′E
- Country: Russia
- Region: Bashkortostan
- District: Salavatsky District
- Time zone: UTC+5:00

Turnaly (Russian: Турналы; Bashkir: Торналы, Tornalı) is a rural locality (a selo) and the administrative centre of Turnalinsky Selsoviet, Salavatsky District, Bashkortostan, Russia. The population was 819 as of 2010. There are 7 streets.

== Geography ==
Turnaly is located 26 km northeast of Maloyaz (the district's administrative centre) by road. Yelgildino is the nearest rural locality.
