= Urmantau =

Urmantau Урмантау
- Selo
- Location within Bashkortostan Location within Russia
- Coordinates: 55°28′N 57°42′E
- Country: Russia
- Region: Bashkortostan
- District: Salavatsky District
- Time zone: UTC+5:00

Urmantau (Russian: Урмантау; Bashkir: Урмантау, Urmantaw) is a rural locality (a selo) in Taymeyevsky Selsoviet, Salavatsky District, Bashkortostan, Russia. The population was 357 as of 2010. There are 8 streets.

== Geography ==
Urmantau is located 52 km northwest of Maloyaz (the district's administrative centre) by road. Ustyatavka is the nearest rural locality.
