= Tetramelas flindersianus =

Scientific classification
- Kingdom: Fungi
- Division: Ascomycota
- Class: Lecanoromycetes
- Order: Caliciales
- Family: Caliciaceae
- Genus: Tetramelas
- Species: T. flindersianus

Binomial name
- Tetramelas flindersianus Elix (2020)

Species of lichen

Tetramelas flindersianus is a saxicolous (rock-dwelling) crustose lichen species in the family Physciaceae. First described scientifically in 2020, it is found in Australia.

== Taxonomy ==
The type specimen of the lichen was collected on Tasmania's Flinders Island. It was found approximately 5.8 km (3.6 mi) southeast of West Point, either on or near a siliceous rock outcrop. Tetramelas flindersianus, is named after its type locality, Flinders Island in Tasmania. It is similar to Tetramelas filsonii, but is distinct in having a non-amyloid medulla, narrower ascospores, and containing only atranorin.

== Description ==
The thallus of Tetramelas flindersianus is crustose and areolate, growing up to 60 mm wide and 1 mm thick. The areoles, ranging from 1–2.5 mm wide, can be scattered or contiguous, sometimes aggregating to form a secondary somewhat squamulose (scaly) crust that occasionally lifts off the substrate. The upper surface of the thallus is off-white to grey-white, dull, and granular in parts, with no visible prothallus. The photobiont cells measure 8–23 μm wide, and the medulla is white, lacking crystals of calcium oxalate.

The apothecia are 0.3–1 mm wide, lecideine in type, and can be separate or in small groups, broadly adnate to sessile, with a black, non-powdery (epruinose), flat to weakly convex disc. The proper exciple is prominent, entire, and shiny, measuring 40–50 μm thick. The epihymenium is dark brown to dark olive-brown, while the hypothecium beneath is brown to brown-black, forming a central plug. The hymenium is 65–90 μm thick, colourless, and the subhymenium beneath it is pale brown, 20–35 μm thick. Paraphyses are 1.5–2.0 μm wide, sparsely branched, with dark brown capped tips. The asci are of the Bacidia type, containing eight spores. The ascospores are initially of the Callispora- or Physconia-types, then of the Buellia-type, brown, ellipsoid to broadly fusiform or bottle-shaped, measuring 13–20 by 5–7 μm, and the outer spore-wall is microrugulate. Pycnidia are immersed, punctiform, with bacilliform conidia measuring 5–7 by 0.7–1 μm. Chemically, the thallus contains atranorin as a major lichen product.

== Habitat and distribution ==
Tetramelas flindersianus has been found on hard, siliceous rocks such as quartzite at two locations on Flinders Island, Tasmania, and one in Victoria. It is associated with typical nearshore lichen species like Buellia stellulata, Caloplaca cribrosa, Catillaria austrolittoralis, Lecanora subcoarctata, Pertusaria xanthoplaca, Rinodina blastidiata, and Tylothallia verrucosa.
