= Tetramelas gariwerdensis =

Scientific classification
- Kingdom: Fungi
- Division: Ascomycota
- Class: Lecanoromycetes
- Order: Caliciales
- Family: Caliciaceae
- Genus: Tetramelas
- Species: T. gariwerdensis

Binomial name
- Tetramelas gariwerdensis Elix (2020)
- Holotype site: Mount William, Victoria

Species of lichen

Tetramelas gariwerdensis is a species of saxicolous (rock-dwelling), crustose lichen in the family Physciaceae, described in 2020. It is found in the Grampians National Park in western Victoria, Australia.

== Taxonomy ==
Tetramelas gariwerdensis is named after its type locality in the Gariwerd (Grampians mountain range) in Victoria, Australia. This region holds cultural significance for the Djab Wurrung and the Jardwadjali, the traditional people of the area. The species is similar to Tetramelas darbishirei, but is distinguished by its areolate, crustose thallus instead of a somewhat erect, pulvinate thallus.

== Description ==
Tetramelas gariwerdensis is distinguished by its crust-like (crustose) and tiled (areolate) thallus, which can spread up to 15 mm in width and 0.3 mm in thickness. The individual tile-like sections (areoles) vary in shape from round to irregular or angular and range in size from 0.3 to 1 mm wide. These areoles can either be scattered across the thallus or closely packed together (contiguous). The upper surface of the thallus has an off-white to pale yellow colour, characterised by a dull and uneven texture. The thallus does not have a visible border (prothallus), and the cells of the symbiotic green algae (photobiont cells) within it measure between 9 and 15 μm in diameter.

The white medulla, or inner layer of the thallus, does not contain calcium oxalate as indicated by its lack of reaction to sulfuric acid, but it does react to iodine, turning pale purple. The lichen's reproductive structures (apothecia) are small, measuring 0.2 to 0.6 mm in width, and lecideine in type. These apothecia can be found separately or in small groups, either broadly attached (adnate) or slightly raised (sessile) on the thallus. The apothecia's disc is black, non-powdery (epruinose), and its shape varies from weakly concave to flat or even convex, becoming wavy (undulate) as it ages.

The proper exciple (rim surrounding the disc) is initially prominent and elevated above the disc but becomes level with the disc over time. In a cross-section, it measures 25–35 μm in thickness, with an outer part that is brown-black and an inner part that is paler brown. The tissue supporting the spore-producing hymenium (hypothecium) is brown to brown-black and 100–120 μm thick. The spore-producing layer (hymenium) itself is 55–70 μm thick, clear, and sometimes contains scattered oil droplets. The layer beneath the hymenium (subhymenium) is pale brown and 10–15 μm thick.

The paraphyses (slender filaments within the hymenium) are 1.5–2 μm wide, with simple to sparsely branched structures that have dark brown capped tips. The spore-producing sacs (asci) are of the Bacidia type and typically contain eight ascospores. These spores initially resemble those of the Callispora or Physconia types but mature into the Buellia type. They are brown, ellipsoid to broadly fusiform in shape, measuring 15–25 by 7–12 μm. Older spores often become constricted at the division (septum) and sometimes curved, occasionally with one or two internal divisions (endosepta), and have a finely wrinkled (microrugulate) outer wall. The pycnidia, another reproductive structure, are immersed and punctiform (point-like). The rod-shaped spores (conidia) produced within these structures measure 4.5–6.5 by 1 μm.

Chemically, the thallus of Tetramelas gariwerdensis predominantly contains atranorin, alongside a minor component of 6-O-methylarthothelin.

== Habitat and distribution ==
Known only from the Grampians in western Victoria, Tetramelas gariwerdensis grows on stone. It is found in association with other lichen species such as Circinaria caesiocinerea, Buellia aethalea, Buellia ocellata, Lecidea lygomma, Ramboldia petraeoides, Rhizocarpon geographicum, and various Xanthoparmelia species.
