= Tetramelas confusus =

Scientific classification
- Domain: Eukaryota
- Kingdom: Fungi
- Division: Ascomycota
- Class: Lecanoromycetes
- Order: Caliciales
- Family: Caliciaceae
- Genus: Tetramelas
- Species: T. confusus

Binomial name
- Tetramelas confusus A.Nordin (2004)

Species of lichen

Tetramelas confusus is a species of crustose lichen in the family Caliciaceae. Found in the South Island of New Zealand, it was formally described as a new species in 2002 by Anders Nordin. The lichen is only known to occur in the Central Otago mountains, where it grows in alpine grasslands on dead grass, plant detritus, and old rabbit droppings. It has a thin, creamy-white to greyish-white thallus that spreads irregularly. Secondary chemicals found in the lichen include 6-O-methylarthothelin (major) and atranorin (minor). Similar species include T. papillatus, T. insignis, and T. graminicolus.

== Taxonomy ==
Swedish lichenologist Anders Nordin formally described Tetramelas confusus in 2004 after recognising that specimens from New Zealand previously assigned to Buellia papillata differed consistently in anatomy and chemistry. His type material, collected by David J. Galloway on the Old Man Range / Kopuwai (Otago), became the species' holotype. Nordin placed the taxon in Tetramelas, a genus resurrected a few years earlier for crustose lichens with relatively large, brown, one- to three-celled spores and xanthone chemistry. Within that genus, T. confusus is morphologically intermediate between T. papillatus and T. insignis. It resembles the former in spore length but shares with the latter a thin, irregular thallus and the presence of the xanthone 6-O-methylarthothelin. Key separating characters include its broader, basally constricted apothecia (to 2.5 mm wide) and slightly smaller spores than those of T. insignis.

A DNA sequence of the internal transcribed spacer region of Tetramelas confusus was included in a molecular analysis of several Tetramelas species published in 2005; the result suggests that its closest relative is T. papillatus.

== Description ==
Tetramelas confusus forms a thin, patchy crust (thallus) that spreads irregularly across its substrate. The surface is warty to minutely papilla-like and ranges from creamy to pale grey-white. Chemical spot tests are K+ (yellowish) and C+ (orange-yellow), reactions that reflect minor amounts of atranorin and abundant 6-O-methylarthothelin. The lichen's reproductive structures are abundant blackish discs (apothecia). Each apothecium is superficially attached yet slightly narrowed where it meets the thallus, a shape that gives the whole disc a "pinched" appearance. Discs are up to 2.5 mm across—large for the genus—and their margins remain well defined and often wavy even in old specimens. The rim and inner ring of fungal tissue (exciple) are permanently dark-pigmented and composed of thick-walled, rounded cells. Beneath the brown epithecium, the colourless hymenium stands 55–77 μm tall; unlike some others in the genus it lacks oil droplets. Slender, septate filaments (paraphyses) thread this layer, each only 2 μm thick but swelling to roughly 5 μm at the tip. Mature asci contain eight ellipsoid spores that turn mid-brown, have a single internal wall (septum), taper slightly at the ends, and measure 16–21 × 5–7.5 μm (rarely 13.5–23 μm long). The spore wall consists of a thick inner layer coated by a thinner, cracked outer sheath, a configuration typical of Tetramelas species. Asexual propagules are uncommon; when present, immersed pycnidia release colourless, rod-shaped conidia about 5–6 × 1 μm.

== Habitat and distribution ==
The species is restricted to the alpine zone of Central Otago in New Zealand's South Island, where it is locally common above about 1200 metres elevation. It colonises organic debris that accumulates among tussock grasses—such as dead grass blades, decaying moss cushions, plant litter, and occasionally weathered rabbit pellets—rather than mineral soil or rock. These substrates provide a stable, slightly elevated microhabitat that remains aerated yet retains enough moisture for growth in the exposed, windy grasslands that dominate the Old Man Range and neighbouring mountains.
