= Physconia rossica =

Scientific classification
- Domain: Eukaryota
- Kingdom: Fungi
- Division: Ascomycota
- Class: Lecanoromycetes
- Order: Caliciales
- Family: Physciaceae
- Genus: Physconia
- Species: P. rossica

Binomial name
- Physconia rossica Urbanav. (2008)

Species of lichen

Physconia rossica is a species of saxicolous (rock-dwelling), foliose lichen in the family Physciaceae. It is found in mountainous regions of the Russian Far East, Siberia, and Eastern Europe.

== Taxonomy ==
The lichen was formally described as a new species in 2008 by Gennadii Urbanavichus. The type specimen was collected near the village Nazinovo in the Nazhinovskaya Shida River valley (Ishimbayevo district, Southern Ural) at an altitude of 223 m (732 ft). There the lichen was found growing on mosses and soil over rocks at the base of a steep south slope consisting of calcareous rock outcrops.

Molecular phylogenetic analysis suggests that P. rossica forms a monophyletic group in genus Physconia, sister to a group containing P. elegantula, P. perisidiosa, and P. venusta.

== Description ==
Physconia rossica has a greyish-brown to brown, orbicular to irregular thallus measuring 2 to 4 cm (0.8 to 1.6 in) in diameter that is fairly loosely attached to its substratum. The individuals lobes comprising the thallus are long and narrow, measuring 0.7–1.2 mm wide. The thallus surface is pruinose and covered with soredia. The medulla is white. The thallus undersurface is whitish to pale brown. The few rhizines on the underside are whitish to pale brown and feature branching that is either simple (i.e., unbranched) to fasciculate (arranged in bundles). All results of standard chemical spot tests are negative. Apothecia are rare; if present, they are 1–2 mm in diameter. The ascospores measure 26.5–30 by 11.7–13.3 μm.

== Habitat and distribution ==
Widely distributed in the mountainous regions of Siberia, Physconia rossica has been recorded from the Putorana Plateau (Krasnoyarsk Territory), the Eastern Sayan Mountains, the republics of Sakha and Buryatia, and the Magadan Oblast. Its distribution also extends into Europe, as it occurs in the Ural Mountains (Bashkortostan) as well as the Russian Plain in Perm Krai. The lichen grows over mossy rocks and soil in open areas, typically in calcareous habitats.
