= Ishimbayevo =

Ishimbayevo Ишимбаево
- Selo
- Location within Bashkortostan Location within Russia
- Coordinates: 54°56′N 58°01′E
- Country: Russia
- Region: Bashkortostan
- District: Salavatsky District
- Time zone: UTC+5:00

Ishimbayevo (Russian: Ишимбаево; Bashkir: Ишембай, İşembay) is a rural locality (a selo) and the administrative centre of Ishimbayevsky Selsoviet, Salavatsky District, Bashkortostan, Russia. The population was 463 as of 2010. There are 8 streets.

== Geography ==
Ishimbayevo is located 38 km southwest of Maloyaz (the district's administrative centre) by road. Mindishevo is the nearest rural locality.
