= Physconia jacutica =

Scientific classification
- Domain: Eukaryota
- Kingdom: Fungi
- Division: Ascomycota
- Class: Lecanoromycetes
- Order: Caliciales
- Family: Physciaceae
- Genus: Physconia
- Species: P. jacutica

Binomial name
- Physconia jacutica Urbanav., Ahti & Loht. (2007)

Species of lichen

Physconia jacutica is a species of saxicolous (rock-dwelling), foliose lichen in the family Physciaceae. It is found in the Russian Far East.

== Taxonomy ==
The lichen was formally described as a new species in 2007 by Gennadii Urbanavichus, Teuvo Ahti, and Katileena Lohtander. The type specimen was collected on the bank of the Lena River near Elanka (Khangalasskiy Ulus, Sakha Republic) at an altitude of about 100 m (330 ft). There the lichen was found growing abundantly on rocks at the base of a dolomitic cliff from the Cambrian. The habitat in that location is dry and hot with steppe-like vegetation. The authors note that among the high dolomite cliffs, the lichen "is so abundant that it gives a bluish-white tint to the whole landscape".

Molecular phylogenetic analysis suggests that P. jacutica groups together in a clade with P. grumosa, P. lecuoleiptes, P. kurokawae, and P. muscigena.

== Description ==
Physconia jacutica has a greyish-brown to brown, orbicular thallus measuring up to 4–5 cm (1.6–2.0 in) in diameter. The individuals lobes comprising the thallus are linear, measuring 1–1.5 wide. The thallus surface is pruinose and covered with cylindrical isidia. The medulla is white. The thallus undersurface is pale tan to pale brown, becoming darker near the centre. Rhizines are black and have squarrose branching (with numerous short, more or less perpendicular lateral branches). All results of standard chemical spot tests are negative.
