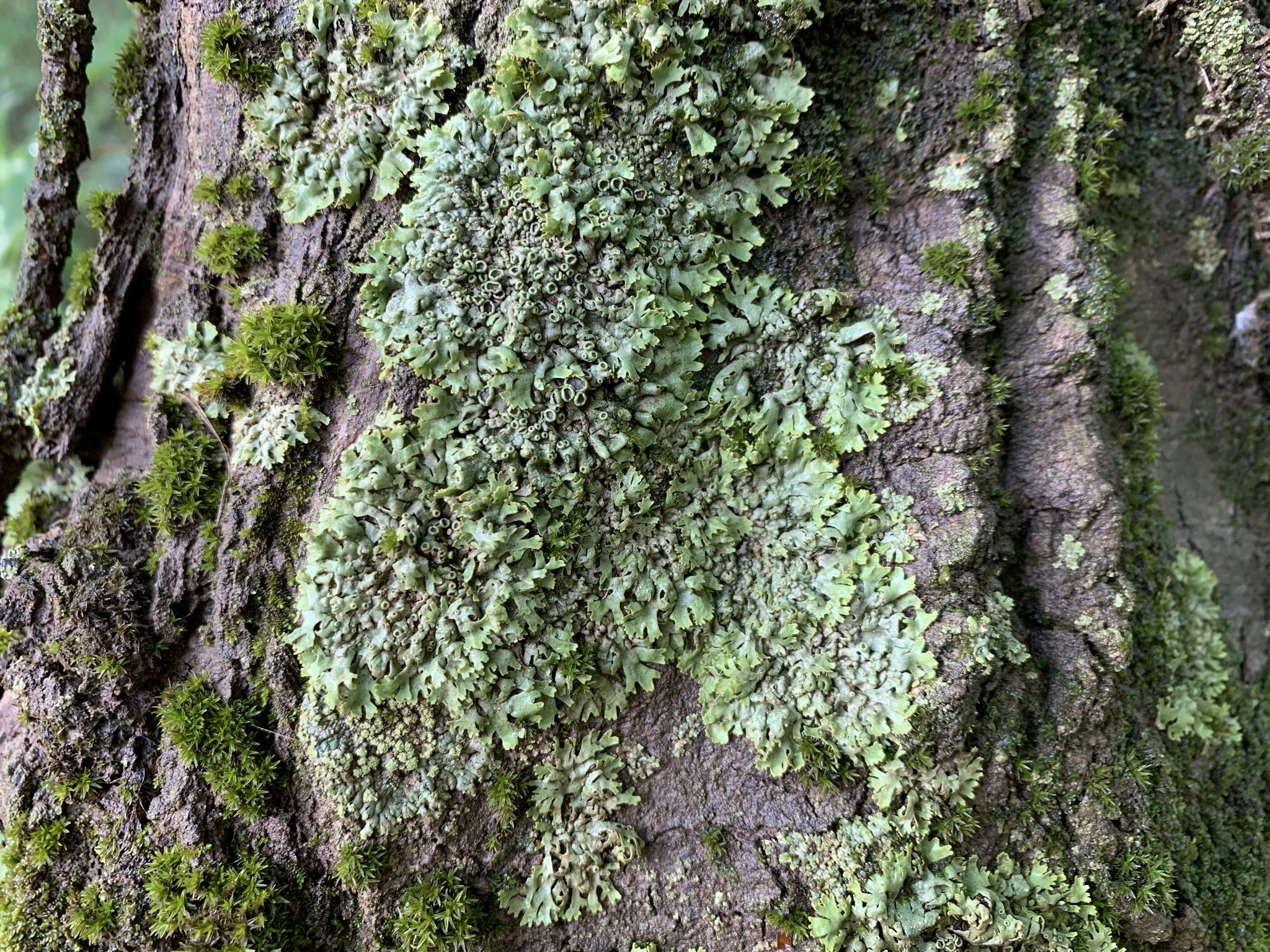

Conservation status
- Endangered (IUCN 3.1)

- Imperiled (NatureServe)

Scientific classification
- Kingdom: Fungi
- Division: Ascomycota
- Class: Lecanoromycetes
- Order: Caliciales
- Family: Physciaceae
- Genus: Phaeophyscia
- Species: P. leana

Binomial name
- Phaeophyscia leana (Tuck.) Essl.

= Phaeophyscia leana =

Endangered species of lichen

Phaeophyscia leana, known as Lea's bog lichen, is an endangered species of lichen found on the IUCN Red List. It is restricted to riparian forest habitats near the Ohio River. The species is threatened by habitat loss, pollution, and changing hydrological regimes.

== Description ==
Phaeophyscia leana is discerned from similar species by having "elongate, strap-shaped lobes, faintly maculate upper surface, lack of soredia, and the paraplectenchymatous, pale lower cortex."

== Habitat and distribution ==
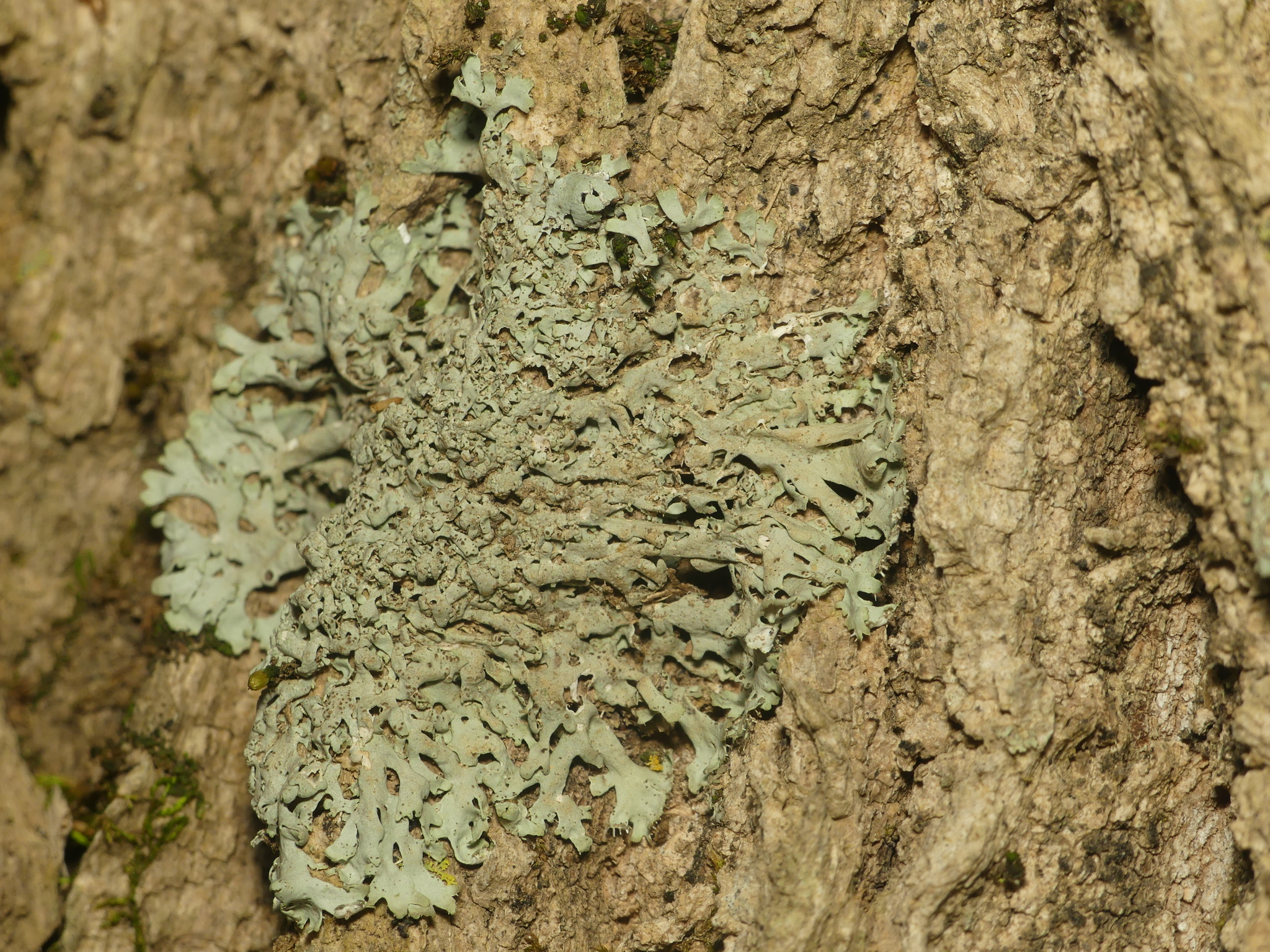
Dry specimen on the bark of a tree

The lichen was first discovered on the bark of a tree by Thomas Lea near Cincinnati, Ohio in 1839. The species was only known from this original type specimen for over a century. It was believed to be extinct until it was collected by Allen Skorepa in southern Illinois in 1978.

The species is now known to have a range along the Ohio River and associated tributaries (Cumberland River, Green River, Tennessee River, Wabash River, and White River). It is extant in six states, including Alabama, Illinois, Indiana, Kentucky, Ohio, and Tennessee.

The species is restricted to growing in floodplains and swamps where inundation is frequent. It usually occurs at the high-water mark on hardwood tree trunks. It does not compete well with other lichen species. Ash trees in particular are important hosts for the lichen, and due to their population decline from the emerald ash borer, Phaeophyscia leana populations may be further threatened.

== Nomenclature ==
The specific epithet honors Thomas Lea, a notable collector of cryptogams in the Cincinnati area who discovered the type specimen. The species was formally described by Edward Tuckerman in 1849 as Parmelia leana. Theodore Lee Esslinger reclassified it as Phaeophyscia leana in 1978.
