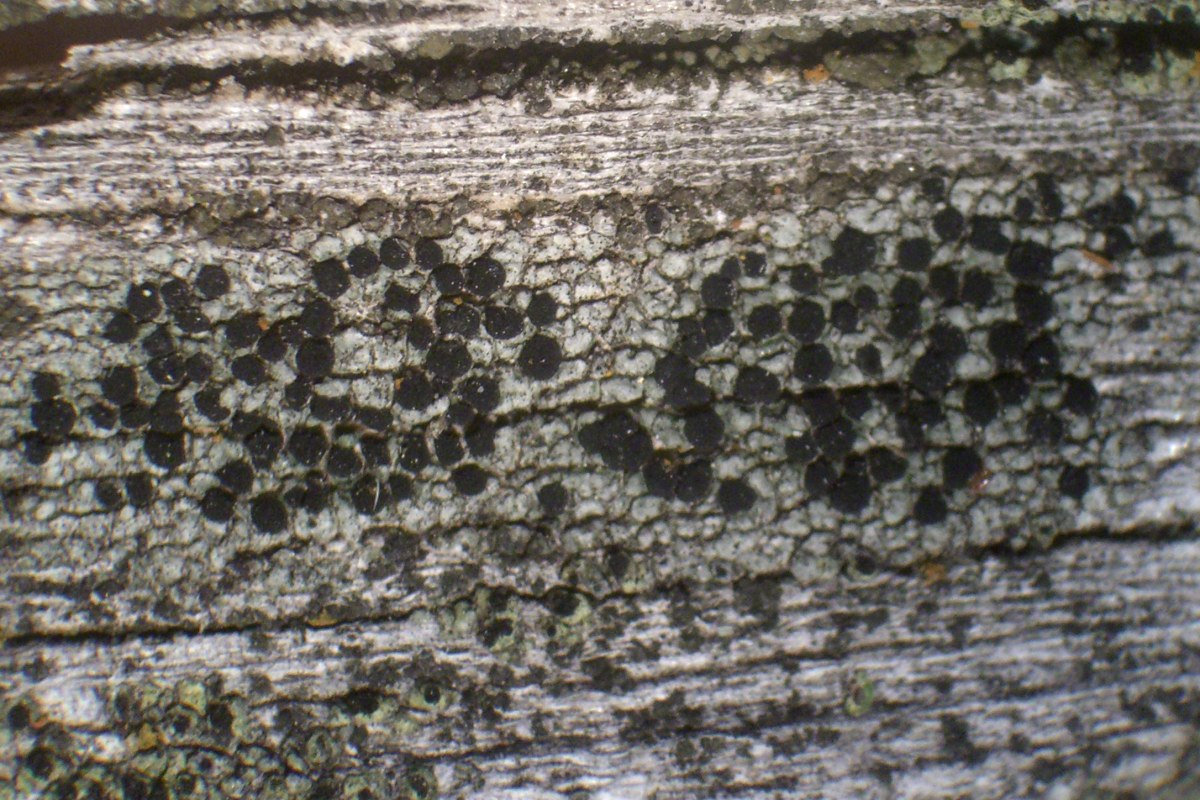
- Tetramelas chloroleucus

Scientific classification
- Kingdom: Fungi
- Division: Ascomycota
- Class: Lecanoromycetes
- Order: Caliciales
- Family: Caliciaceae
- Genus: Tetramelas; Norman (1852)

Type species
- Tetramelas geophilus Norman (1853)

= Tetramelas =

Genus of lichen

Tetramelas is a genus of lichen-forming fungi in the family Caliciaceae. The genus is distinguished by its distinctive spores, which are divided into four compartments and turn brown as they mature, giving rise to the name Tetramelas from the Greek words for 'four' and 'dark'. These lichens typically form greyish crusts on rocks, bark, or other surfaces, with small black disc-shaped fruiting bodies that contain the characteristic four-chambered spores.

== Taxonomy ==
The genus was circumscribed in 1852 by the Norwegian botanist Johannes Musaeus Norman. In his original description, Norman characterized Tetramelas by its distinctive spores, which have cross-walls (septa) running transversely and are clearly divided into four compartments (quadrilocular). He noted that the spore wall becomes somewhat blunted or obtuse as the spores mature and develop their characteristic compartmented structure. The genus name Tetramelas derives from the Greek words τέτρα (tetra, meaning 'four') and μέλας (melas, meaning 'black' or 'dark').

Norman described the fruiting bodies (apothecia) as resembling those found in the genera Lecidea or Biatora, indicating they have a similar disc-like structure with a dark margin. He distinguished Tetramelas from the related genus Dimaura (now known as Catolechia) by several key features, noting that while both genera shared some similarities, Tetramelas was particularly close to the section Sticella of Dimaura and showed connections to both the red Sticella series and the Secoliga group.

Norman established the genus with two species: Tetramelas geophilus (originally described by Sommerfelt) and Tetramelas querneus (originally described by Dickson).

== Description ==
Tetramelas species form a crust-like lichen body (thallus) that spreads irregularly across the surface of rock, bark, or other lichens. The thallus can appear finely cracked, slightly scaly, or minutely granular, and is often grey to whitish in colour—though some species are brown, yellowish, or even orange. A few members of the genus live on other lichens (lichenicolous) but still develop their own, more or less independent thallus as they mature. A thin, dark border (prothallus) is absent, and only one species is known to produce powdery reproductive patches (soralia). The algal partner is a simple, spherical green alga (a chlorococcoid photobiont).

Reproductive structures are mainly disc-shaped apothecia that sit flush with, or slightly raised above, the thallus; their bases may narrow a little where they meet the substrate. When young, some apothecia show a rim of thallus tissue (a thalline margin), but this margin can disappear with age. The proper exciple—a ring of fungal tissue surrounding the disc—is well developed and often flexuous; it begins dark and pigmented and may erode in old specimens. The uppermost tissue (epithecium) ranges from brown to olive or bluish-green, and the clear hymenium beneath it sometimes contains oil droplets. A dark-brown hypothecium lies below. Inside the hymenium are filaments called paraphyses that are septate, simple or forked only near their tips; the swollen tips bear a distinctive dark-brown "cap'. Each club-shaped ascus usually holds eight large, brown ascospores. While still immature the spores resemble those of the genus Callispora, but at maturity they become one- to three-celled, fusiform (spindle-shaped), slightly curved, and enveloped by a thin, irregularly cracked outer layer (epispore) that is less than half the thickness of the main wall.

Asexual reproduction occurs in tiny, immersed flask-shaped structures (pycnidia) whose walls are dark brown at least near the opening. These release simple, colourless, rod-shaped conidia. The secondary chemistry of Tetramelas is varied: many species contain xanthone compounds such as arthothelin, 6-O-methylarthothelin, isoarthothelin, or 2,5,7-trichloro-3-O-methylnorlichexanthone, and others produce the common lichen substance atranorin.

== Species ==
- Tetramelas allisoniae Elix, H.Mayrhofer & Glenny (2017)
- Tetramelas anisomerus (Vain.) Elix (2018)
- Tetramelas austropapillatus (Øvstedal) Elix (2017)
- Tetramelas chloroleucus (Körb.) A.Nordin (2004)
- Tetramelas cladocarpizus (I.M.Lamb) Elix (2018)
- Tetramelas concinnus (Th.Fr.) Giralt (2009)
- Tetramelas confusus A.Nordin (2004) – New Zealand
- Tetramelas coquimbensis (C.W.Dodge) Elix (2019)
- Tetramelas darbishirei (I.M.Lamb) Elix (2018)
- Tetramelas drakonensis Elix (2021)
- Tetramelas filsonii Elix (2019)
- Tetramelas flindersianus Elix (2020)
- Tetramelas franklinbrussei Elix & H.Mayrhofer (2021)
- Tetramelas fuegiensis Elix, H.Mayrhofer & J.M.Rodr. (2018)
- Tetramelas gariwerdensis Elix (2020)
- Tetramelas geophilus Norman (1852)
- Tetramelas graminicola (Øvstedal) Kalb (2004)
- Tetramelas granulosus (Darb.) A.Nordin (2004)
- Tetramelas grimmiae (Filson) Elix (2018)
- Tetramelas inordinatus (Hue) Elix (2018)
- Tetramelas insignis (Nägeli ex Hepp) Kalb (2004)
- Tetramelas kopuwaianus Elix & H.Mayrhofer (2018)
- Tetramelas lokenensis Elix (2019)
- Tetramelas nelsonii (Darb.) Elix (2018)
- Tetramelas oreophilus Elix & Kantvilas (2020)
- Tetramelas papillatus (Sommerf.) Kalb (2004)
- Tetramelas peruviensis Elix (2019) – Peru
- Tetramelas phaeophysciae A.Nordin & Tibell (2005)
- Tetramelas poeltii (T.Schauer) Kalb (2004)
- Tetramelas pulverulentus (Anzi) A.Nordin & Tibell (2005)
- Tetramelas regiomontanus Marbach (2000)
- Tetramelas subpedicellatus (Hue) Elix (2018)
- Tetramelas terricola (A.Nordin) Kalb (2004)
- Tetramelas thiopolizus (Nyl.) Giralt & P.Clerc (2011)
- Tetramelas triphragmioides (Anzi) A.Nordin & Tibell (2005)
- Tetramelas weberianus Elix (2019) – Peru
