= Thomas Gibson Lea =

American botanist (1785–1844)

- Born: December 14, 1785; Wilmington, Delaware
- Died: September 30, 1844 (aged 58); Waynesville, Ohio

Thomas Gibson Lea (December 14, 1785 – September 30, 1844) was an American botanist who was born in Wilmington, Delaware. He was the older brother of the publisher, Isaac Lea and the younger brother of John Lea (1782 – 1862), who is known for his study of a cholera outbreak in Cincinnati, Ohio.

Lea was honored alongside Miles Joseph Berkeley (1803 – 1889; an English cryptogamist and clergyman) in the naming of Berkleasmium in 1854, which is a genus of fungi belonging to the family Dematiaceae. Lea also lends his name to the lichen Phaeophyscia leana.
