= Tylothallia =

Scientific classification
- Domain: Eukaryota
- Kingdom: Fungi
- Division: Ascomycota
- Class: Lecanoromycetes
- Order: Lecanorales
- Family: Lecanoraceae
- Genus: Tylothallia; P.James & R.Kilias (1981)

Type species
- Tylothallia biformigera (Leight.) P.James & H.Kilias (1981)

Species
- T. biformigera T. pahiensis T. verrucosa

Genus of fungi

Tylothallia is a genus of lichen in the family Lecanoraceae. It was circumscribed by German lichenologist Harald Kilias in 1981.
