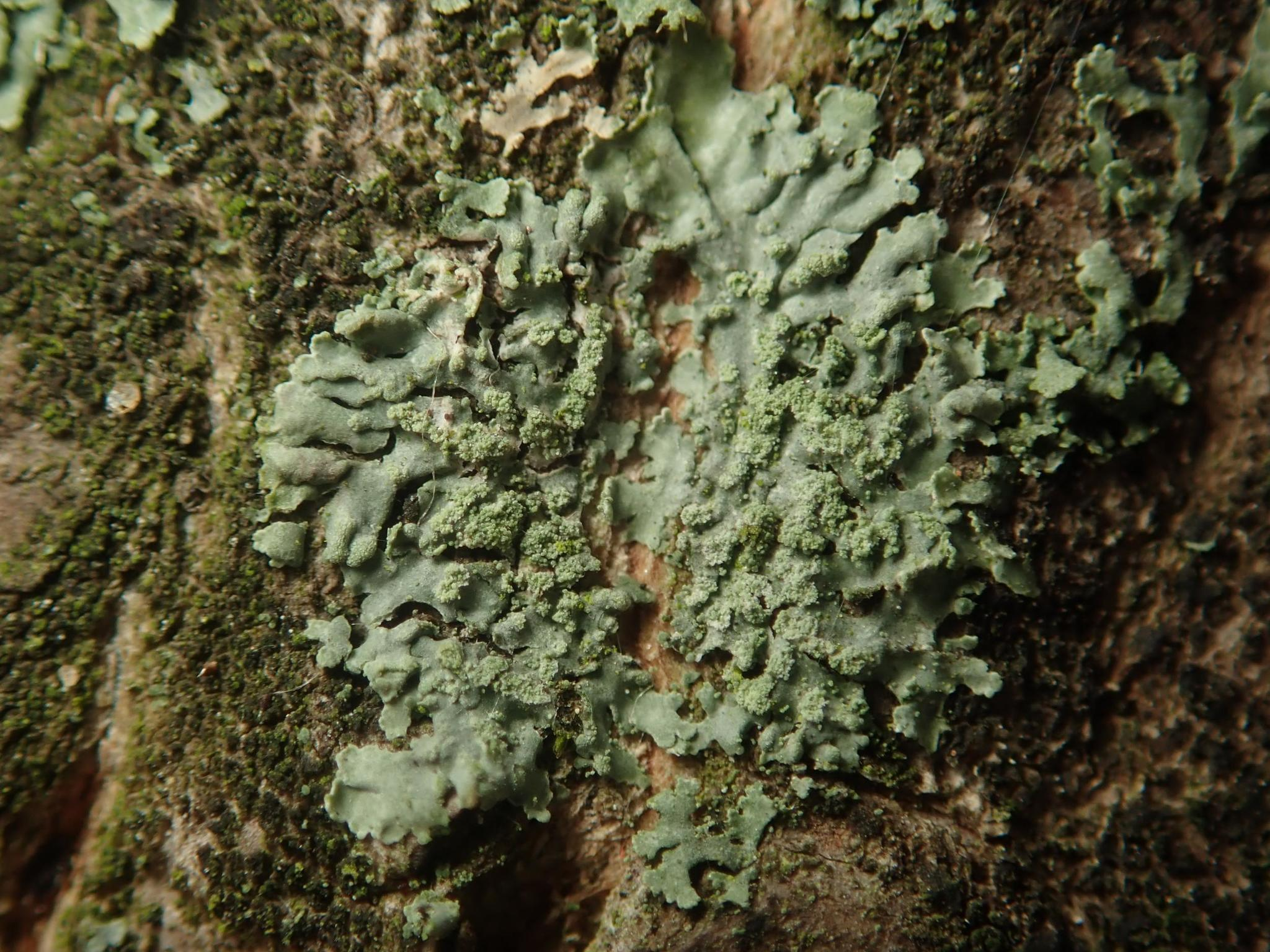
- Phaeophyscia orbicularis

Scientific classification
- Domain: Eukaryota
- Kingdom: Fungi
- Division: Ascomycota
- Class: Lecanoromycetes
- Order: Caliciales
- Family: Physciaceae
- Genus: Phaeophyscia; Moberg (1977)

Type species
- Phaeophyscia orbicularis (Neck.) Moberg (1977)

Synonyms
- Physciella Essl. (1986)

= Phaeophyscia =

Genus of lichens

Phaeophyscia is a genus of lichen-forming fungi in the family Physciaceae. These lichens typically appear as leaf-like (foliose) growths that spread across tree bark, rocks, or other surfaces, usually in well-lit, nutrient-rich environments. Their structure consists of short or long lobes that range in colour from pale grey to dark brown, becoming dark green when wet, and they often have dark undersides with root-like attachments (rhizines). The genus is distinguished from its relatives by its unique chemical composition and reproductive features, lacking a substance called atranorin and producing ellipsoidal spores. While some species reproduce through specialised propagules called soredia or isidia, others form small cup-like fruiting bodies (apothecia) on their surface for reproduction. There are over 50 known species of Phaeophyscia worldwide.

== Taxonomy ==
Phaeophyscia was circumscribed by the Swedish lichenologist Roland Moberg in 1977, separating it from the older genus Physcia. The key distinction of this new genus lay in its chemical composition: unlike Physcia, Phaeophyscia lacks the substance atranorin in its outer protective layer (cortex) and produces ellipsoidal conidia (asexual reproductive cells). The genus can be distinguished from its close relative Physciopsis by its growth pattern, as Phaeophyscia grows more loosely on its substrate compared to Physciopsis's tightly pressed form. It also differs from the genus Physconia in its spore characteristics. Moberg designated Phaeophyscia orbicularis as the type species for this new genus, establishing it as the standard reference for the group's characteristics.

== Description ==
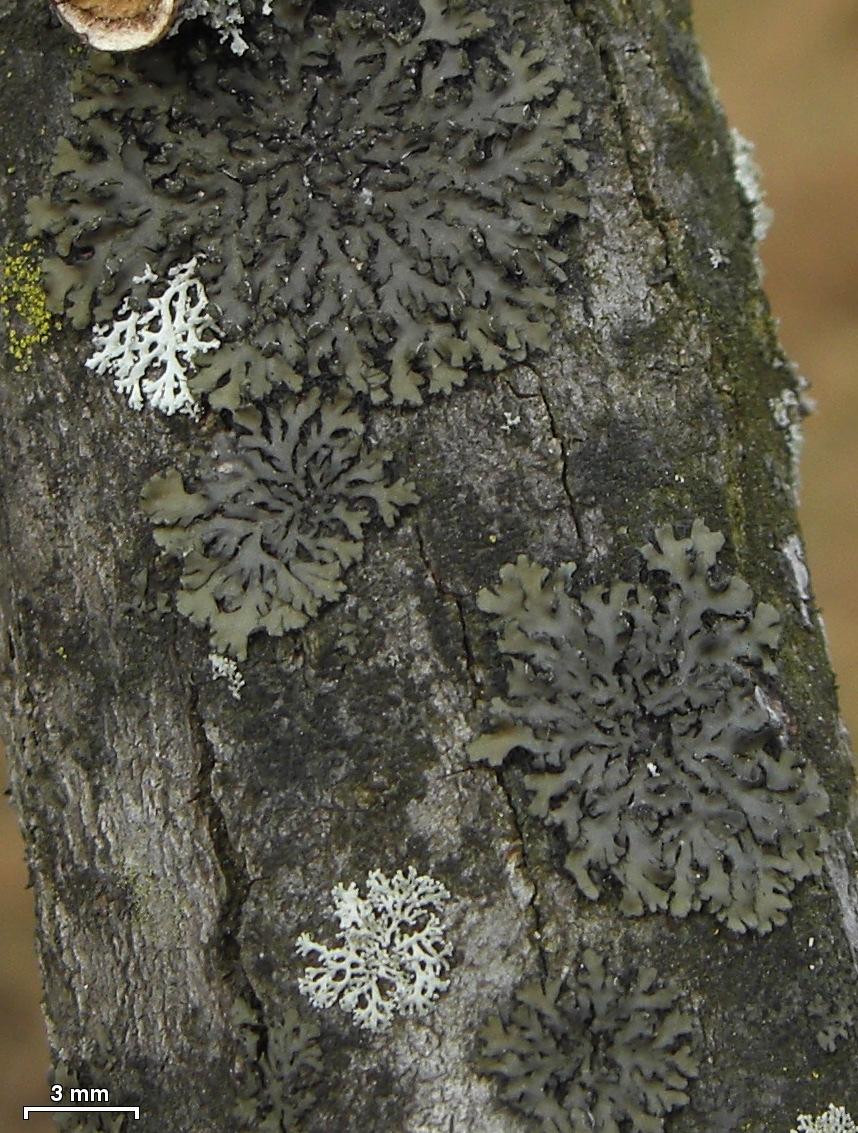
Phaeophyscia pusilloides

Genus Phaeophyscia encompasses a variety of lichen species, characterised by their leaf-like (foliose) structure that often extends in lobes, which can either be short or elongate and tend to lie flat against the substrate, resembling a loosely shrubby form in some instances. These lobes are typically less than 1.5 mm wide and have a range of colours from pale grey or greenish grey to dark brown, becoming dark green when moistened. The surface of these lichens is matte, not covered in a powdery coating (epruinose), and usually lacks spots (maculae) or fringe-like projections (cilia) along the edges. The underside is typically whitish or more commonly black, with matching, simple roots (rhizines) that may extend beyond the lobe tips, giving an appearance similar to cilia.

Internally, the Phaeophyscia lichen has a brown upper layer (epithecium), with colourless internal layers (hymenium and hypothecium). The supporting filamentous structures (hamathecium) consist of slender, often branching paraphyses with club-shaped tips that are pale brown with a thin dark brown top. The spore-producing structures (asci) are approximately cylindrical to club-shaped, containing eight spores of the Lecanora-type. The spores themselves are brown, thick-walled, and divided by a single cross-wall (1-septate), resembling those found in the genus Physcia.

== Chemistry ==
In terms of chemical composition, Phaeophyscia lichens do not react to a solution of potassium hydroxide (K–) on the cortex and medulla, indicating the absence of atranorin. However, some species contain yellow to orange-red pigments that turn purple with potassium hydroxide (K+), known as skyrin, or terpenoids.

== Reproduction ==
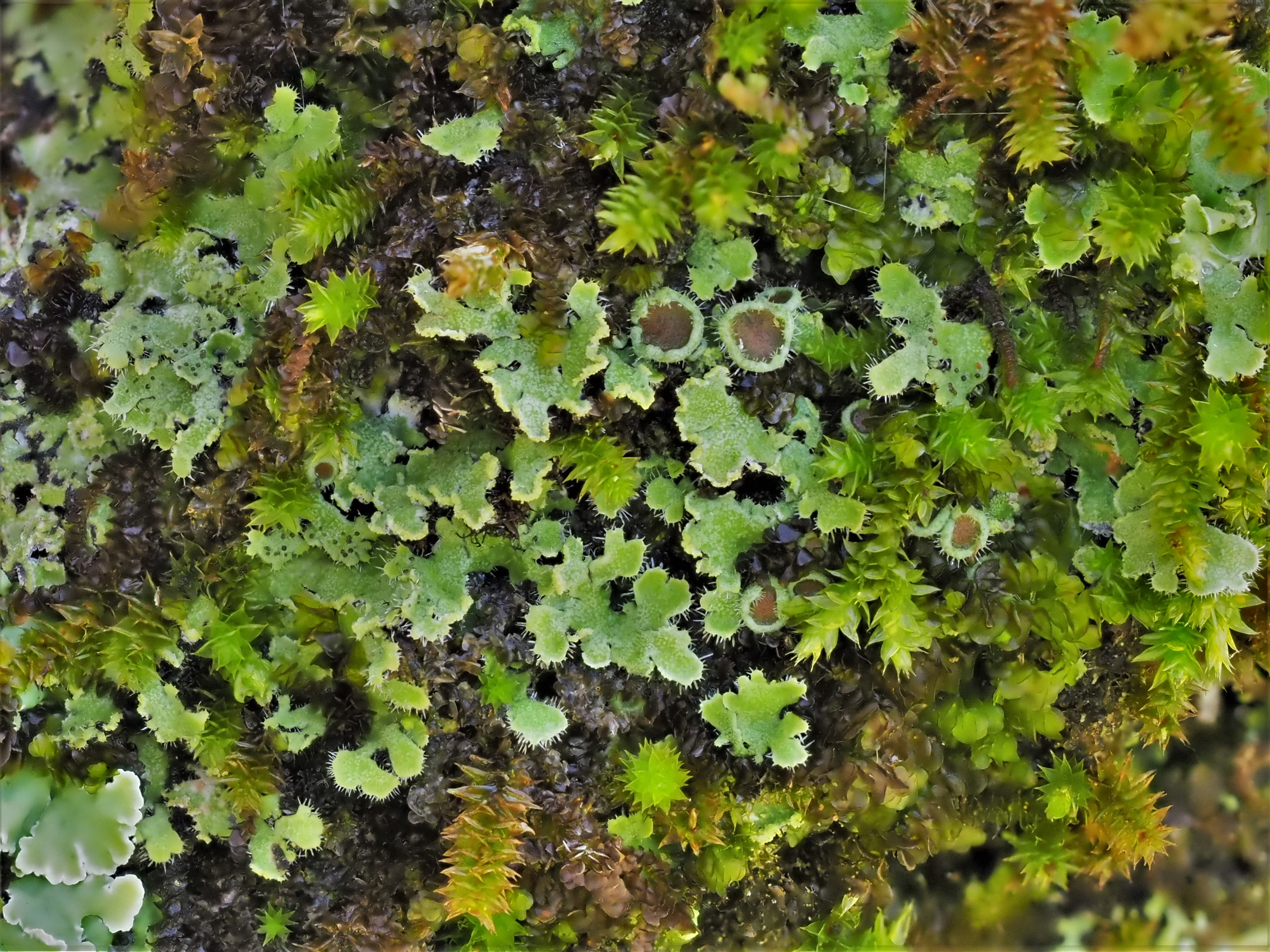
Phaeophyscia hirtella

Some Phaeophyscia species develop soredia or isidia, specialised structures (propagules) used for asexual reproduction. The upper and lower layers of the thallus (cortex) are composed of closely packed cells (pseudoparenchymatous), with the algal partner (photobiont) being trebouxioid–that is, from the green algal genus Trebouxia. The reproductive organs (ascomata) are cup-shaped structures (apothecia) found on the lichen's surface, usually encircled by rhizines at their base, with a brown to black disc that lacks a powdery covering. The rim surrounding the reproductive disc (thalline exciple) is smooth and occasionally lobed.

Asexual reproductive structures (conidiomata) are in the form of pycnidia, embedded within the lichen and mostly colourless, except for a brown area around the opening (ostiole). The asexual spores (conidia) are ellipsoidal in shape.

== Habitat, distribution, and ecology ==
Ecologically, Phaeophyscia lichens favour nutrient-rich or enriched substrates in well-lit environments. They are distinguished from the closely related Hyperphyscia by their ellipsoidal, not thread-like, conidia, while Physcia species have rod-shaped (bacilliform) conidia.

Seventeen species of Phaeophyscia have been reported from South Korea.

== Uses ==
Because of its ability to bioaccumulate heavy metals following exposure to pollution, Phaeophyscia hispidula has been used in several air quality biomonitoring studies in India, where it is abundant and widespread.

== Species ==
As of May 2025, Species Fungorum (in the Catalogue of Life) accept 26 species of Phaeophyscia, although many more have been described in the genus.

- Phaeophyscia adiastola (Essl.) Essl. (1978)
- Phaeophyscia cernohorskyi (Nádv.) Essl. (1978)
- Phaeophyscia ciliata (Hoffm.) Moberg (1977)
- Phaeophyscia confusa Moberg (1983)
- Phaeophyscia constipata (Nyl.) Moberg (1977)
- Phaeophyscia crocea Aptroot & Sipman (1991)
- Phaeophyscia culbersonii Essl. (2004)
- Phaeophyscia dagestanica Urbanav. (2016) – Russian Caucasus
- Phaeophyscia decolor (Kashiw.) Essl. (1978)
- Phaeophyscia denigrata (Hue) Moberg (1994)
- Phaeophyscia echinata (Frey) N.S.Golubk. (1981)
- Phaeophyscia endoaurantiaca (Barkh.) Schumm (2019)
- Phaeophyscia endococcina (Körb.) Moberg (1977)
- Phaeophyscia endococcinodes (Poelt) Essl. (1978)
- Phaeophyscia endophoenicea (Harm.) Moberg (1977)
- Phaeophyscia erythrocardia (Tuck.) Essl. (1978)
- Phaeophyscia esslingeri S.Y.Kondr., Lőkös, J.J.Woo & Hur (2016) – East Asia
- Phaeophyscia exornatula (Zahlbr.) Kashiw. (1984)
- Phaeophyscia fumosa Moberg (1983)
- Phaeophyscia hirsuta (Mereschk.) Essl. (1978)
- Phaeophyscia hirtella Essl. (1978)
- Phaeophyscia hirtuosa (Kremp.) Essl. (1978)
- Phaeophyscia hispidula (Ach.) Essl. (1978)
- Phaeophyscia hunana G.R.Hu & J.B.Chen (2003) – China
- Phaeophyscia imbricata (Vain.) Essl. (1978)
- Phaeophyscia insignis (Mereschk.) Moberg (1978)
- Phaeophyscia kaghanensis Niazi, Nadeem, Afshan & Khalid (2023) – Pakistan
- Phaeophyscia kairamoi (Vain.) Moberg (1977)
- Phaeophyscia kashmirensis
- Phaeophyscia laciniata Essl. (1979)
- Phaeophyscia latifolia Kudratov (2002)
- Phaeophyscia leana (Tuck.) Essl. (1978)
- Phaeophyscia limbata (Poelt) Kashiw. (1984)
- Phaeophyscia lygaea (Poelt) D.D.Awasthi (1988)
- Phaeophyscia melanchra (Hue) Hale (1983)
- Phaeophyscia microspora Aptroot & Schumm (2019)
- Phaeophyscia nadvornikii (Frey & Poelt) N.S.Golubk. (1981)
- Phaeophyscia nashii Essl. 2004)
- Phaeophyscia nepalensis (Poelt) D.D.Awasthi (1988)
- Phaeophyscia nigricans (Flörke) Moberg (1977)
- Phaeophyscia opuntiella (Buschardt & Poelt) Hafellner (1992)
- Phaeophyscia orbicularis (Neck.) Moberg (1977)
- Phaeophyscia primaria (Poelt) Trass (1981)
- Phaeophyscia pusilloides (Zahlbr.) Essl. (1978)
- Phaeophyscia pyrrhophora (Poelt) D.D.Awasthi & M. Joshi (1978)
- Phaeophyscia rubropulchra (Degel.) Moberg (1978)
- Phaeophyscia saxatilis (Kashiw.) S.Y.Kondr. (2018)
- Phaeophyscia sciastra (Ach.) Moberg (1977)
- Phaeophyscia sonorae Essl. (2004)
- Phaeophyscia spinellosa Kashiw. (1984)
- Phaeophyscia squarrosa Kashiw. (1984)
- Phaeophyscia stiriaca (Poelt) Clauzade & Cl.Roux (2001)
- Phaeophyscia strigosa (Poelt & Buschardt) N.S.Golubk. (1981)
- Phaeophyscia sulphurascens (Zahlbr.) Trass (1981)
- Phaeophyscia ticinensis (Mereschk.) Schumm (2019)
- Phaeophyscia trichophora (Hue) Essl. (1978)
