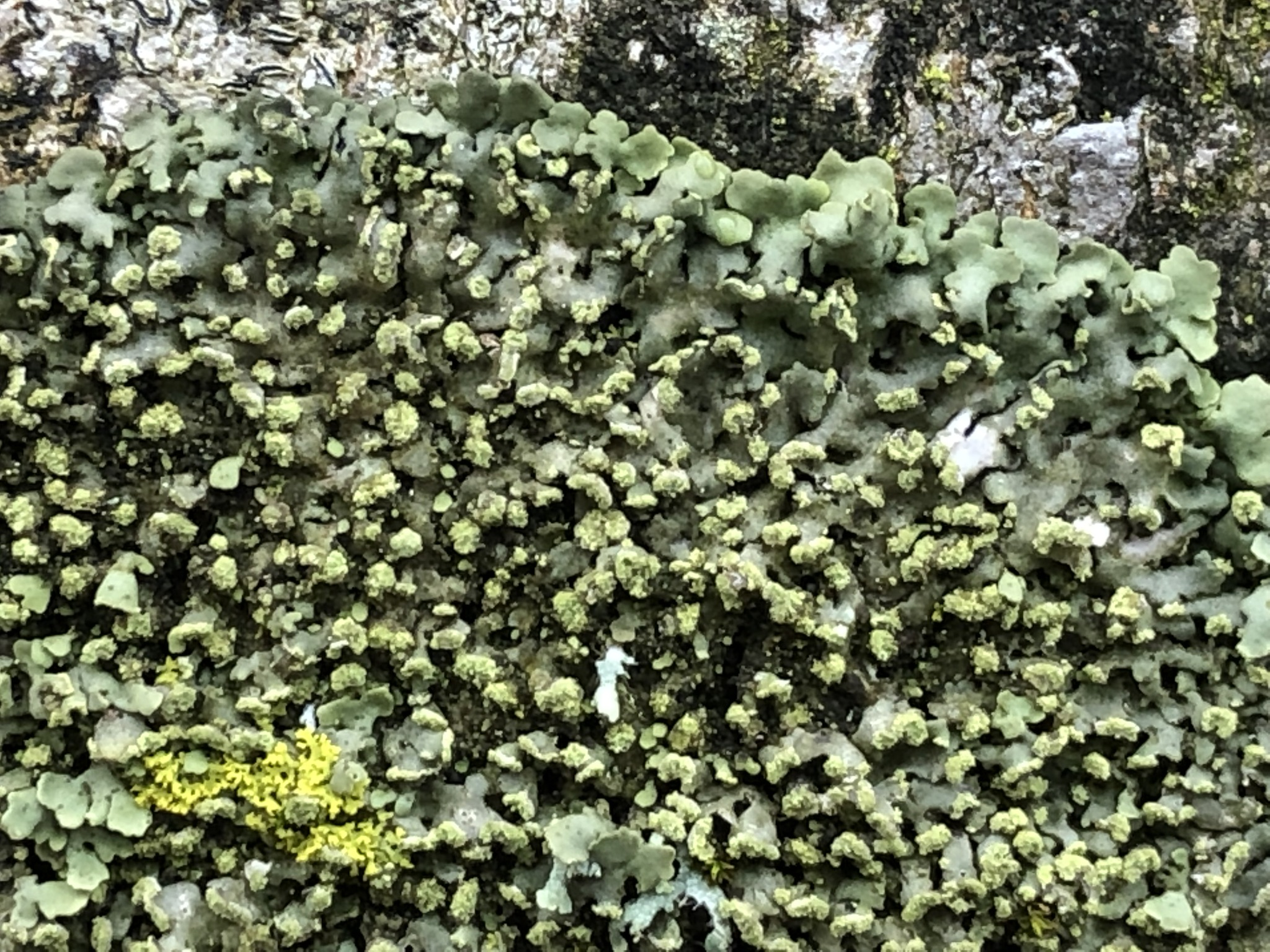

Scientific classification
- Domain: Eukaryota
- Kingdom: Fungi
- Division: Ascomycota
- Class: Lecanoromycetes
- Order: Caliciales
- Family: Physciaceae
- Genus: Phaeophyscia
- Species: P. endophoenicea

Binomial name
- Phaeophyscia endophoenicea (Harm.) Moberg (1977)

Synonyms
- Physcia obscura var. endophoenicea Harm. (1910)

= Phaeophyscia endophoenicea =

Species of lichen

Phaeophyscia endophoenicea is a species of corticolous (bark-dwelling) foliose lichen in the family Physciaceae. It is characterized by a grey to pale brown rosette-forming thallus that grows 1–3 cm wide. It features narrow lobes with yellowish to reddish powdery reproductive structures called soredia, and a distinctive black lower surface with abundant root-like rhizines that anchor it to its substrate. The lichen's inner tissue (medulla) is typically yellow to orange-red in its lower part. Though rare and possibly underreported, P. endophoenicea primarily grows on the bark of slanting trees across various European regions, extending from southern areas into Scandinavia, with presence in relatively undisturbed forests of European Russia, Ukraine, and the Netherlands.

== Taxonomy ==
The species was first described in 1910 by the French lichenologist Julien Herbert Auguste Jules Harmand, who classified it as a variety of Physcia obscura. Roland Moberg elevated it to distinct species status in his 1977 monograph on the genus Physcia.

== Description ==
Phaeophyscia endophoenicea is a foliose (leaf-like) lichen characterised by a heteromerous, dorsiventral thallus that forms orbicular to more commonly irregular rosettes measuring 1–3 cm in width. The thallus is narrow-lobed and closely adnate (tightly attached) to the substrate in the central portion.

The lobes are grey to pale brown in specimens exposed to sunlight, typically measuring 1–1.5 mm in width. They appear dull to weakly shiny, lack pruina (a powdery coating), and feature ascending tips. The lobes develop terminal, labriform (lip-shaped) soralia, with laminal (surface) soralia often present as well. The soredia (vegetative reproductive propagules) are frequently yellowish to reddish due to the exposed medulla, appearing farinose (flour-like) in texture, with individual soredia typically less than 40 μm in diameter.

The lower surface of the thallus is black and has abundant, black, simple (unbranched) rhizines (root-like structures that anchor the lichen to its substrate). The upper cortex (protective outer layer) is paraplectenchymatous (composed of closely packed fungal cells resembling a cellular tissue) and exceeds 22 μm in thickness. The medulla (inner layer) is characteristically yellow to orange-red in its lower part, though rarely white throughout. The lower cortex is also paraplectenchymatous in structure.

Apothecia (disc-shaped fruiting bodies) are rare and lecanorine in form (with a rim containing algal cells). The epithecium (uppermost layer of the hymenium) is brown, while both the hymenium (spore-producing layer) and hypothecium (layer beneath the hymenium) are colourless. The paraphyses (sterile filaments in the hymenium) are slender and often forked in their upper portions, with clavate (club-shaped) apical cells featuring a thin dark cap.

The asci (spore-producing sacs) are clavate and contain eight spores each. They have a K/I+ blue tholus (apical thickening) penetrated by a faintly amyloid apical cushion with parallel or diverging flanks. The wall is K/I− (does not react with potassium iodide), but is surrounded by a K/I+ blue outer layer, conforming to the Lecanora-type. The ascospores are 1-septate (having one cross-wall), brown, ellipsoid, measuring 23–28 by 9–11 μm, and are of the Physcia-type. Pycnidia (asexual reproductive structures) are rare.

The photobiont (photosynthetic partner) is chlorococcoid (a green alga). Chemical spot tests show that the cortex is K−, C−, KC−, and P−. However, the soralia and medulla are often K+ red). The medulla typically contains the pigment skyrin and lacks fatty acids.

== Habitat and distribution ==
Phaeophyscia endophoenicea typically occurs on bark substrates, particularly on inclined or slanting trees. Although rare and possibly underreported, it has been found in diverse European regions extending northward into Scandinavia. The first record for the Netherlands was from a slanting willow tree near Haamstede in Zeeland. It is rare in central European Russia, where it occurs primarily in old-growth and relatively undisturbed forests. It has been reported from Bryansk oblast, growing on moss-covered bark of fallen trees in floodplain mixed forests. Within the European part of Russia, it has also been found in Karelia, Leningrad, Mordovia, and Pskov oblasts. In Ukraine, it has been recorded from several regions, including the Carpathian Mountains and Crimea.
