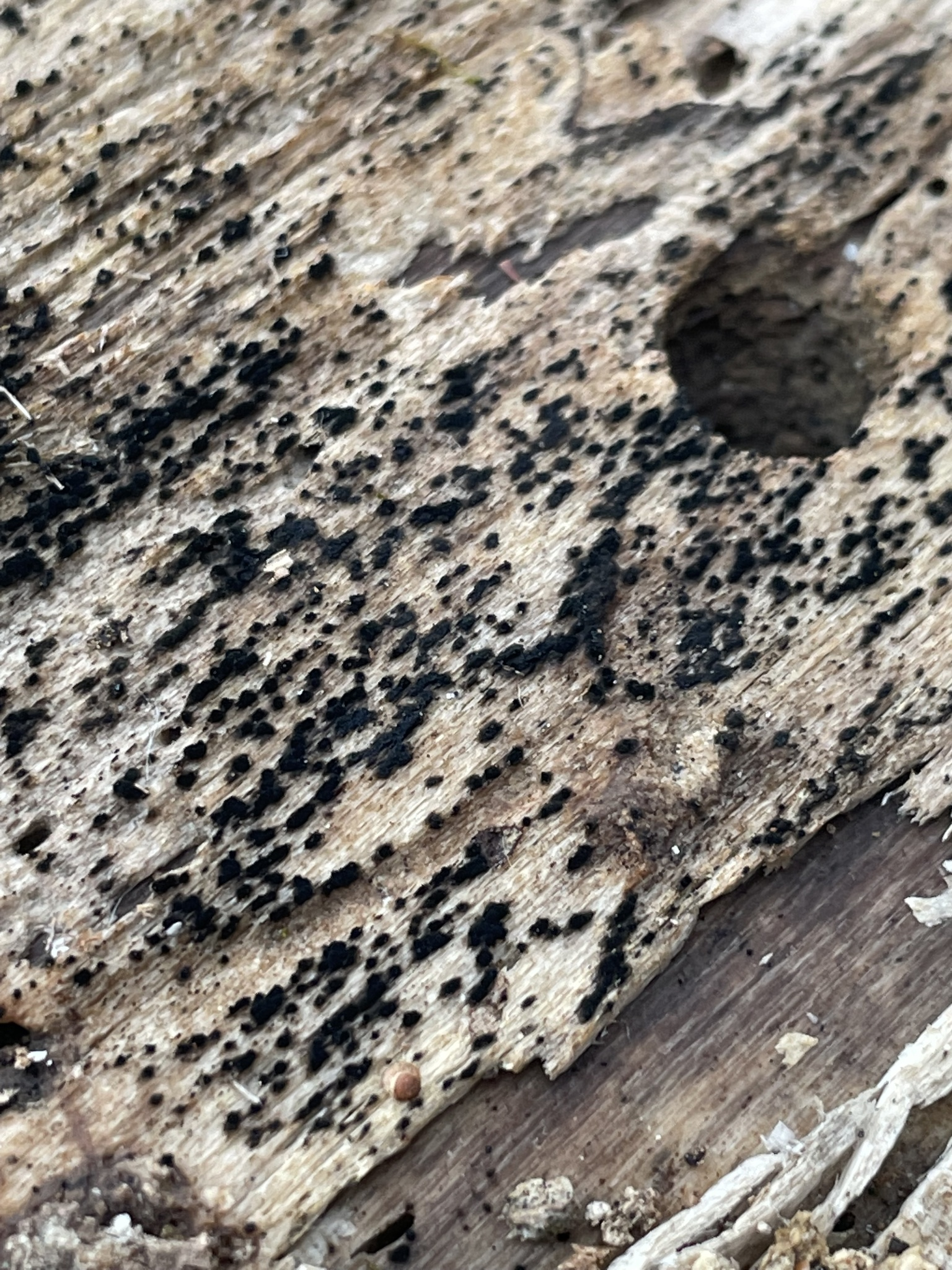
- Berkleasmium concinnum

Scientific classification
- Kingdom: Fungi
- Division: Ascomycota
- Class: Dothideomycetes
- Order: Tubeufiales
- Family: Tubeufiaceae
- Genus: Berkleasmium; Zobel, 1854

= Berkleasmium =

Genus of fungi

Berkleasmium is a genus of fungi belonging to the family Dematiaceae.

The genus name of Berkleasmium is in honour of 2 people (Berkley and Lea), Miles Joseph Berkeley (1803 - 1889), an English cryptogamist and clergyman, and one of the founders of the science of plant pathology and also Thomas Gibson Lea (1785–1844), who was an American botanist.

The genus was circumscribed by Johann Baptista Zobel in Icon. (Corda) vol.6 n page 4 in 1854.

== Species ==
- Berkleasmium crunisia
- Berkleasmium micronesicum
- Berkleasmium nigroapicale
- Berkleasmium phyllostachydis
- Berkleasmium sp. BCC 17003
- Berkleasmium sp. BCC 17023
- Berkleasmium sp. BCC 17024
- Berkleasmium sp. Dzf12
- Berkleasmium typhae
