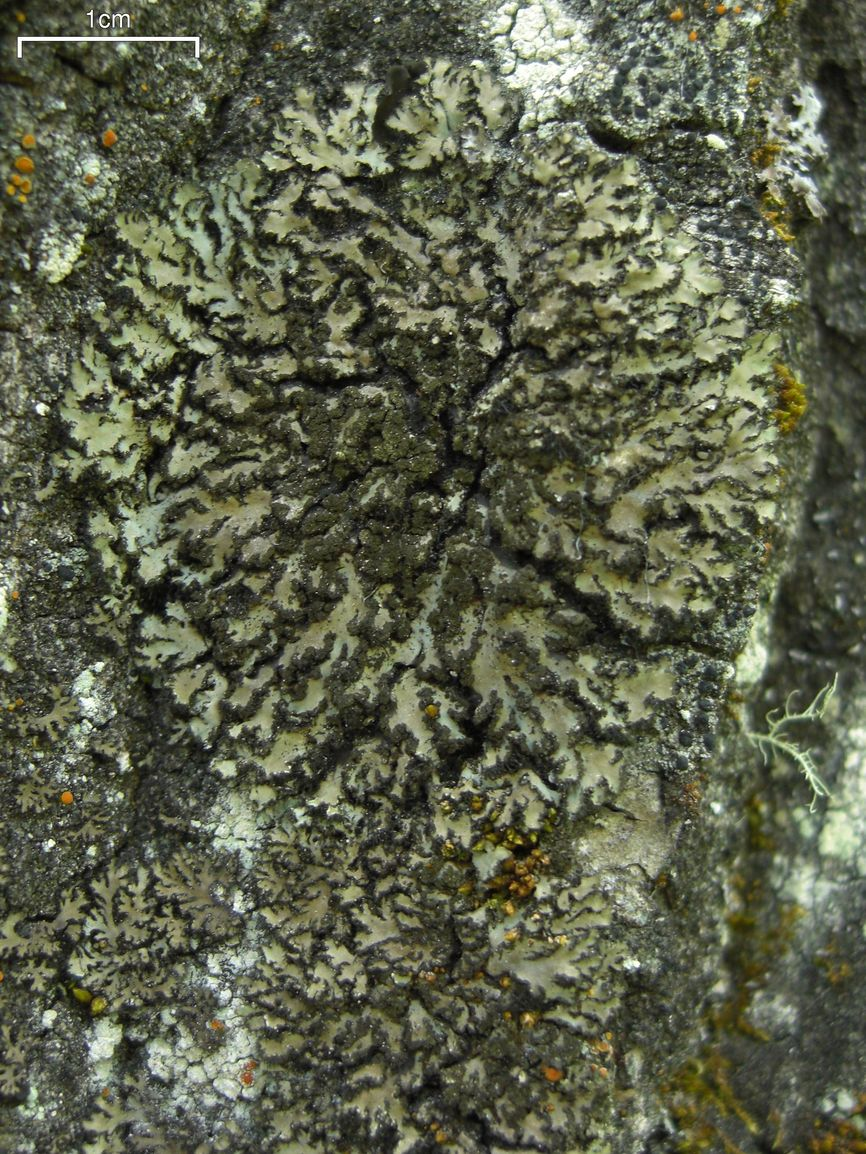

Scientific classification
- Kingdom: Fungi
- Division: Ascomycota
- Class: Lecanoromycetes
- Order: Caliciales
- Family: Physciaceae
- Genus: Phaeophyscia
- Species: P. sciastra

Binomial name
- Phaeophyscia sciastra (Ach.) Moberg (1977)

Synonyms
- List: Parmelia sciastra Ach. (1803); Lichen fahlunensis var. sciastrus (Ach.) Wahlenb. (1812); Lichen diatrypus * sciastra (Ach.) Lam. (1813); Parmelia fahlunensis var. sciastra (Ach.) Ach. (1814); Parmelia olivacea var. sciastra (Ach.) Fr. (1831); Parmelia fahlunensis f. sciastra (Ach.) Fr. (1831); Physcia obscura var. sciastra (Ach.) Nyl. (1860); Hagenia obscura var. sciastra (Ach.) Bagl. & Carestia (1865); Dimelaena obscura var. sciastra (Ach.) Trevis. (1868); Parmelia obscura var. sciastra (Ach.) Wedd. (1875); Physcia lithotea var. sciastra (Ach.) Nyl. (1877); Parmelia lithotea var. sciastra (Ach.) Arnold (1884); Parmelia lithotea f. sciastra (Ach.) Arnold (1884); Physcia sciastra (Ach.) Nyl. (1890); Physcia obscura f. sciastra (Ach.) H.Olivier (1897); Parmelia obscura f. sciastra (Ach.) Jatta (1900); Physcia orbicularis f. sciastra (Ach.) Schade (1938)

= Phaeophyscia sciastra =

Species of lichen-forming fungus

Phaeophyscia sciastra, commonly known as the dark shadow lichen or the five o'clock shadow, is a widespread species of foliose lichen in the family Physciaceae. This rock-dwelling species tend to form rosettes on sun-exposed rocks, especially sandstone. The thalli, which grow up to 5 cm (2.0 in) in diameter and are closely attached to their substrate, are made of flat to convex lobes typically up to 0.5 mm wide. The lichen occurs in Africa, Asia, Europe, and North America, and is one of the most widespread members of its genus in boreal and subtropical regions. In Nepal, P. sciastra has been reported from 3,900 to 5,200 m elevation in a compilation of published records; this reported range extends above the tree line used in the study.

The prominent characteristic of Phaeophyscia sciastra is the presence of black, granular isidia that occur in both laminal and marginal areas of the thallus. Apothecia (fruiting bodies) occur rarely in this species. All chemical spot tests are negative on P. sciastra, implying the absence of any secondary metabolites (lichen products). Individuals or populations of P. sciastra with longer lobes and that lack isidia tend to resemble P. decolor.

It was first formally described as a new species in 1803 by the Swedish lichenologist Erik Acharius, who classified it in the genus Parmelia. After having been transferred to other genera and sometimes treated as a subtaxon of other species in its taxonomic history, another Swedish lichenologist, Roland Moberg, reclassified it to Phaeophyscia in 1977.
