= Tetramelas pulverulentus =

Conservation status
- Apparently Secure (NatureServe)

Scientific classification
- Kingdom: Fungi
- Division: Ascomycota
- Class: Lecanoromycetes
- Order: Caliciales
- Family: Caliciaceae
- Genus: Tetramelas
- Species: T. pulverulentus

Binomial name
- Tetramelas pulverulentus (Anzi) A.Nordin & Tibell (2005)

Synonyms
- List: Abrothallus pulverulentus Anzi (1860); Arthonia muscigenae (Anzi) Jatta (1900); Buellia pulverulenta (Anzi) Jatta (1900); Celidiopsis muscigenae (Anzi) Arnold (1870); Celidium muscigenae Anzi (1864); Dactylospora pulverulenta (Anzi) Arnold (1874); Diplotomma pulverulentum (Anzi) D.Hawksw. (2002); Karschia pulverulenta (Anzi) Körb. (1865); Leciographa muscigenae (Anzi) Rehm (1890)

Species of lichen

Tetramelas pulverulentus is a species of lichenicolous (lichen-dwelling) fungus in the family Caliciaceae. Originally described from Italy in 1860, this inconspicuous fungus lives hidden within the white inner tissue (medulla) of its host lichen rather than forming a visible crust on the surface. It produces tiny black fruiting bodies that contain brown ascospores and is distinguished from related species by having spores divided into three compartments (septa). It is known to infect the lichen species Physconia muscigena.

== Taxonomy ==
The fungus was originally described as a new species by Martino Anzi in 1860. The type specimen was collected in Italy. Swedish lichenologists Anders Nordin and Leif Tibell transferred it to the genus Tetramelas in 2005 based on molecular phylogenetics analysis. It is closely related to Tetramelas phaeophysciae but differs from that species in its ascospores, which have three septa.

== Description ==
Tetramelas pulverulentus is an inconspicuous, lichen-dwelling fungus that lives within the white inner layer (medulla) of its host lichen rather than forming an obvious surface crust of its own. Even so, it develops a very thin outer skin (cortex) only 10–20 μm high, beneath which it houses its own microscopic green algal partner (photobiont) and therefore functions as an independent lichen at this stage of its life cycle.

The reproductive bodies are tiny, blackish discs (apothecia) 0.3–0.5 mm across—occasionally reaching 0.7 mm—that sit on the surface of the host. Each apothecium is ringed by a permanently dark-pigmented rim (exciple) made of rounded, thick-walled cells, while the uppermost layer (epithecium) is brown. Beneath this lies the clear, spore-producing tissue (hymenium), 55–77 μm tall and lacking the oil droplets found in some related species. A darker supportive layer (hypothecium) underpins the hymenium. Thread-like hyphae called paraphyses, only about 2 μm wide but swelling to 5 μm at their tips, weave through the hymenium. Each club-shaped ascus typically contains eight brown ascospores measuring 16–21 μm long (occasionally 14.5–23 μm) and 6.5–8.5 μm wide; the spores are one- to three-celled and bear a fine, warty ornamentation.

Asexual reproductive structures (pycnidia) are uncommon, but when present they release colourless, rod-shaped conidia about 5–6 μm long and 1 μm wide. Thin-layer chromatography has not detected any lichen products in this species.
