= Tylothallia verrucosa =

Scientific classification
- Domain: Eukaryota
- Kingdom: Fungi
- Division: Ascomycota
- Class: Lecanoromycetes
- Order: Lecanorales
- Family: Lecanoraceae
- Genus: Tylothallia
- Species: T. verrucosa

Binomial name
- Tylothallia verrucosa (Müll.Arg.) Kantvilas (2014)

Species of lichen

Tylothallia verrucosa is a lichen in the family, Lecanoraceae. It was first described as Patellaria verrucosa in 1896 by Johannes Müller Argoviensis.

It is found on a wide range of non-calcareous rocks (including dolerite, granite, mudstone and sandstone), exposed to considerable sea-spray, from sea-level to up to 20 metres above the high tide mark.
