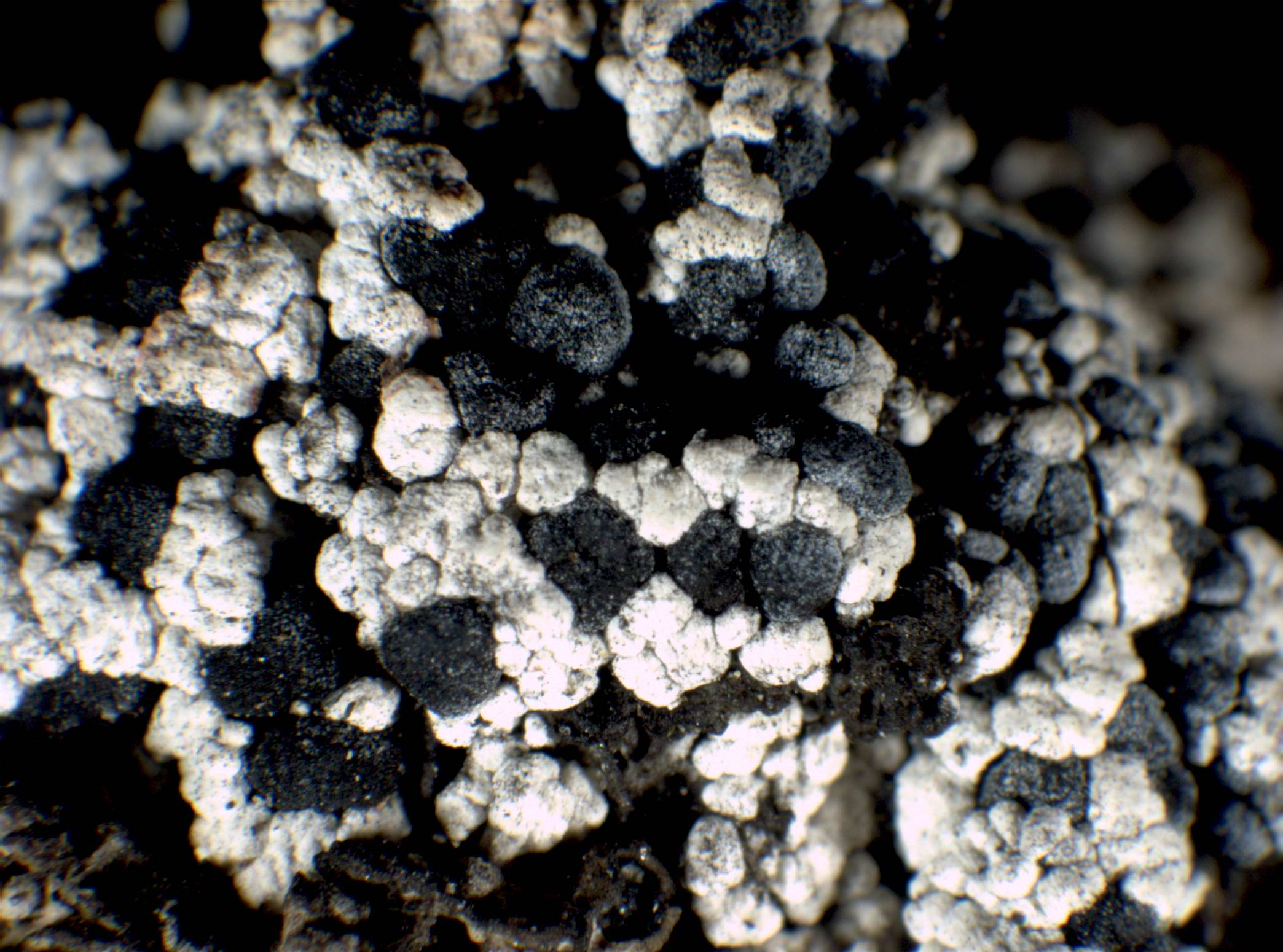

Scientific classification
- Kingdom: Fungi
- Division: Ascomycota
- Class: Lecanoromycetes
- Order: Caliciales
- Family: Caliciaceae
- Genus: Tetramelas
- Species: T. papillatus

Binomial name
- Tetramelas papillatus (Sommerf.) Kalb (2004)

Synonyms
- List: Lecidea papillata Sommerf. (1826); Abacina papillata (Sommerf.) Norman (1852); Buellia insignis var. papillata (Sommerf.) Körb. (1855); Buellia papillata (Sommerf.) Tuck. (1866); Buellia parasema var. papillata (Sommerf.) Th.Fr. (1874); Buellia parasema subsp. papillata (Sommerf.) Tuck. (1888); Buellia disciformis var. papillata (Sommerf.) Vain. (1909); Buelliopsis papillata (Sommerf.) Fink (1935); Diplotomma papillatum (Sommerf.) C.W.Dodge (1973)

= Tetramelas papillatus =

Species of lichen-forming fungus

Tetramelas papillatus is a species of crustose lichen in the family Caliciaceae. It was first described in 1826 by the Norwegian botanist Søren Christian Sommerfelt from specimens collected in northern Norway. The lichen forms a white, granular crust with small wart-like bumps and tiny black fruiting bodies. It grows primarily on rocks among mosses in regions with arctic and alpine climates, with a bipolar distribution spanning both polar regions and high mountains. The species has been transferred between several genera over nearly two centuries before being reclassified in Tetramelas in 2004.

== Taxonomy ==
In 1826 the Norwegian botanist Søren Christian Sommerfelt introduced the species as Lecidea papillata, based on a rare collection from Saltdal in Nordland, Norway, where it grew among mosses on lower-alpine rocks. In his diagnosis he described a white, uneven, granular crust that becomes papillose (with small wart-like bumps) when the granules are widely spaced and, where they are crowded, forms a more or less continuous crust with a finely granulate surface; the fruiting bodies (apothecia) are small and black with a thin margin that soon disappears, the disc smooth at first but later somewhat irregular and faintly warted, the interior tissue remaining the same dark colour. He compared the taxon with Lecidea sanguineoatra, but noted that his species lacks that lichen's blood-red thallus colour and was found among mosses.

Following the renewed use of Tetramelas in the early 2000s, the combination Tetramelas papillatus was made by Klaus Kalb in 2004. Anders Nordin's 2004 review of the group notes that while Tetramelas has often been framed by large spores, a mainly moss-dwelling, (sub)alpine ecology, and the secondary metabolite 6-O-methylarthothelin, T. papillatus is an exception chemically (it lacks 6-O-methylarthothelin). He emphasised instead a consistent microscopic trait across the group: pigmented ascospores with a thick proper wall overlain by a much thinner, irregularly cracked perispore.

Edward Tuckerman (1866) subsumed Sommerfelt's taxon under Buellia insignis (now Tetramelas insignis), a view repeated by Henry Imshaug (1951) and widely adopted in North America. When Nordin re-examined 44 herbarium specimens labelled 'Buellia papillata' from various herbaria (FH, MSC, and UC), only ten proved to be Tetramelas papillatus; the remaining 34 were T. insignis.

=== Similar species ===
Among close relatives, T. insignis has larger spores and typically larger apothecia (to about 1.5 mm), and it contains 6-O-methylarthothelin; by contrast, T. papillatus has a thicker, chalky-white, more coherent, broadly papillate thallus, smaller broadly sessile apothecia (to about 1 mm) with margins often excluded and not flexuose, and it lacks 6-O-methylarthothelin (containing only atranorin).

== Description ==
The thallus of Tetramelas papillatus is white to grey-white and breaks into low, rounded plates (areoles) that can become distinctly blistered (convex-areolate to bullate). The fruiting bodies (apothecia) are small, up to about 1 mm across, and sit directly on the thallus (sessile). They occur singly or may merge (discrete to confluent), are sometimes covered with a fine, frosty bloom (pruinose), and soon become strongly convex and lack a distinct rim (immarginate). When young they may show a rim formed by the thallus itself (a thalline rim). The apothecial wall (exciple) is dark-pigmented; the thin surface film (epithecium) is brown; the spore-bearing layer (hymenium) shows no visible oil droplets; and the tissue beneath it (hypothecium) is brown.

The ascospores are ellipsoid, with uniformly thickened, finely warted walls, measuring (15–)18–22(–25) × 7–10 μm. Asexual fruiting bodies (pycnidia) have not been observed to occur in this species. Standard spot tests on the thallus give C–, K+ (pale yellow), Pd–, and UV– reactions, consistent with the presence of atranorin.

== Habitat and distribution ==
Tetramelas papillatus has a bipolar range, occurring in both polar regions with outliers on high mountains. In the Northern Hemisphere it is widespread in Arctic–alpine habitats, recorded from central and northern Europe (including Scandinavia), West Greenland, Novaya Zemlya, the East Caucasus, arctic Asia, and arctic and alpine North America. It also reaches high elevations in the Himalayas. In Nepal, it has been reported at 4,650 m elevation in a compilation of published records; this reported range lies above the tree line used in the study. In the Southern Hemisphere it is known from New Zealand and has scattered Antarctic records (James Ross Island off the north-east coast of Graham Land, and King George Island in the South Shetlands). There are no verified records from Australia or Chile. In Fennoscandia, T. papillatus is rare and confined to subalpine and alpine belts.
