= Tikeyevo =

Tikeyevo Тикеево
- Village
- Location within Bashkortostan Location within Russia
- Coordinates: 54°49′N 56°52′E
- Country: Russia
- Region: Bashkortostan
- District: Iglinsky District
- Time zone: UTC+5:00

Tikeyevo (Russian: Тикеево; Bashkir: Тәкәй, Täkäy) is a rural locality (a village) in Nadezhdinsky Selsoviet, Iglinsky District, Bashkortostan, Russia. The population was 117 as of 2010. There are 6 streets.

== Geography ==
Tikeyevo is located 40 km east of Iglino (the district's administrative centre) by road. Sotsialistichesky is the nearest rural locality.
