= Physconia muscigena =

Conservation status
- Secure (NatureServe)

Scientific classification
- Kingdom: Fungi
- Division: Ascomycota
- Class: Lecanoromycetes
- Order: Caliciales
- Family: Physciaceae
- Genus: Physconia
- Species: P. muscigena

Binomial name
- Physconia muscigena (Ach.) Poelt (1965)

Synonyms
- Parmelia muscigena Ach. (1810)

Species of lichen

Physconia muscigena is a species of lichen in the family Physciaceae. It exhibits a foliose growth form with lobes that are generally ascending and concave at the tips. The upper cortex is grey-brown to brown in color and often mostly to completely pruinose (or covered in calcium oxalate crystals known as pruina).

== Ecology and distribution ==
Physconia muscigena is often found growing mosses, small plants (such as Selaginella), or detritus atop of soil or rock. Its distribution is cosmopolitan, found on all continents including Antarctica.

It is a host to the lichenicolous fungus species Tetramelas pulverulentus.
