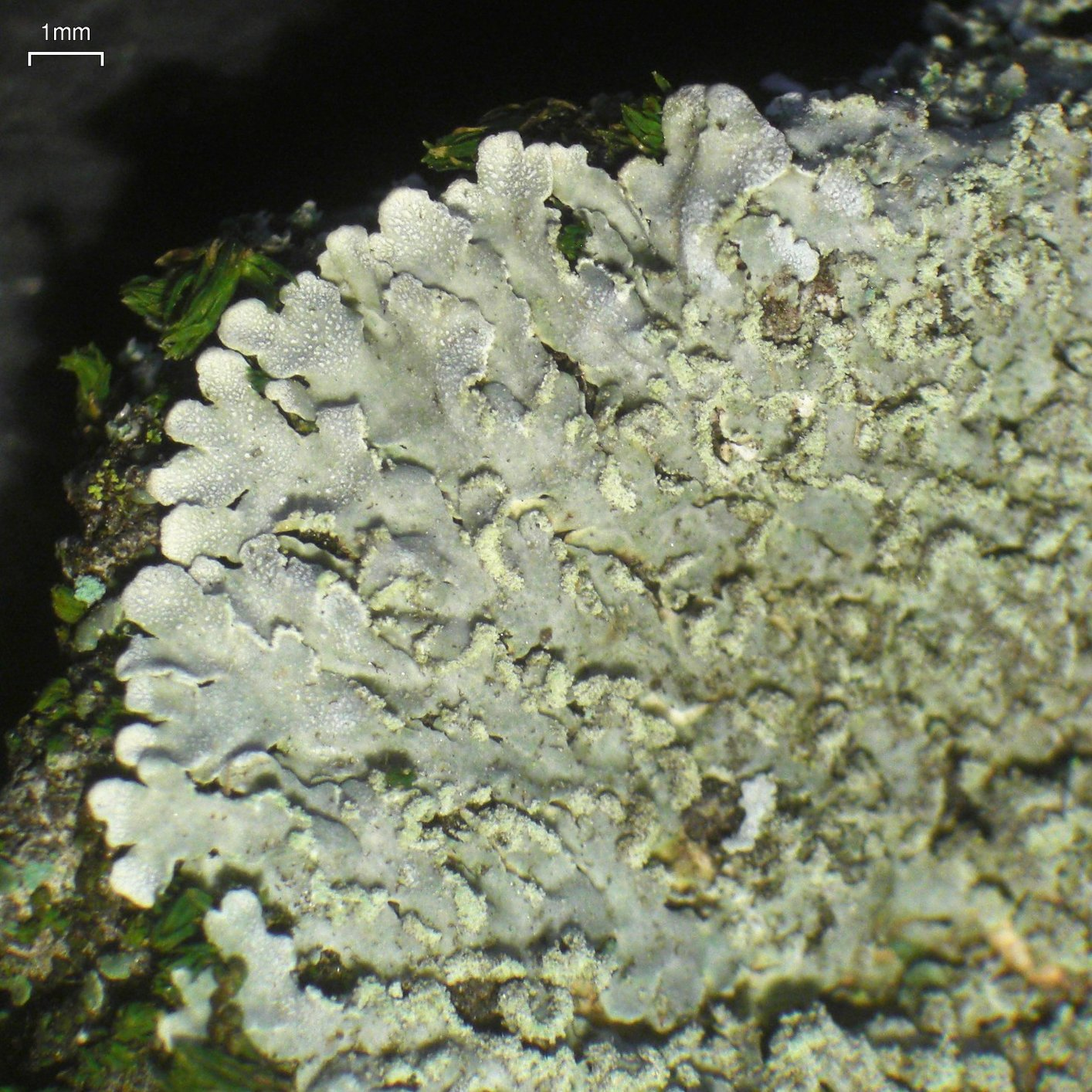
- Physconia enteroxantha

Scientific classification
- Domain: Eukaryota
- Kingdom: Fungi
- Division: Ascomycota
- Class: Lecanoromycetes
- Order: Caliciales
- Family: Physciaceae
- Genus: Physconia; Poelt (1965)

Type species
- Physconia pulverulenta (Hoffm.) Poelt (1965)

= Physconia =

Genus of lichens in the family Physciaceae

Physconia is a genus of lichen-forming fungi in the family Physciaceae. It comprises 13 species. The genus was established in 1965 by the lichenologist Josef Poelt and is characterized by leaf-like growth forms with lobes typically less than 3 mm wide that often have a whitish, powdery coating on their tips. These lichens can be distinguished from similar genera by their distinctive brown ascospores that have thick walls, fine warts, and a single dividing wall but lack the end thickenings found in related groups.

== Taxonomy ==
The genus was circumscribed by the Czech lichenologist Josef Poelt in 1965, with Physconia pulverulenta assigned as the type species.

== Description ==
Physconia lichens form leaf-like (foliose) rosettes whose lobes are usually less than 3 mm wide. Colonies can be neat and roughly circular or irregular mats merging with neighbouring thalli. The lobes lie fairly close to the surface but are not tightly glued down and lack the fringe hairs (cilia) seen in some related genera. Upper surfaces range from dull grey to dark brown and are matt or only faintly glossy; a thin, whitish frost (pruina) commonly dusts the lobe tips. Some species also produce soredia—powdery granules that break off and serve as ready-made propagules. The underside is whitish to brown-black and may lose its lower cortex near the lobe tips. Internally, the upper cortex is built either from block-like cells about 3–7 μm across or from densely packed hyphae with much smaller lumina; the lower cortex is always of the latter type. The photosynthetic partner is a green alga of the Trebouxia group.

Fruiting bodies (apothecia) sit on the lobe surfaces and lack the root-like rhizines sometimes found beneath other genera. Their discs are brown but almost always coated in white pruina. A collar of thallus tissue (the thalline margin) surrounds each disc; it persists, often curls slightly inward and may bear tiny lobules or soredia. Microscopy shows a brown epithecium topping a colourless hymenium and hypothecium. Ascospores develop eight to an ascus and match the "Physconia type": they are thick-walled, single-septate, finely warted and brown, with a broad internal cross-wall but no extra thickening at the ends—one of the main features separating the genus from Physcia. Asexual propagules form in immersed pycnidia whose walls are mostly colourless except around the pore; these structures release rod-shaped, colourless conidia. Chemical tests detect no atranorin and, at most, trace amounts of unidentified lichen substances.

== Species ==
As of June 2025, Species Fungorum (in the Catalogue of Life) accept 13 species of Physconia.

- Physconia californica Essl. (2000)
- Physconia chinensis J.B.Chen & G.R.Hu (2003)
- Physconia distorta (With.) J.R.Laundon (1984)
- Physconia enteroxantha (Nyl.) Poelt (1966)
- Physconia fallax Essl. (2000)
- Physconia grisea (Lam.) Poelt (1965)
- Physconia jacutica Urbanav., Ahti & Loht. (2007)
- Physconia labrata Essl., McCune & Haughland (2017)
- Physconia muscigena (Ach.) Poelt (1965)
- Physconia perisidiosa (Erichsen) Moberg (1977)
- Physconia pulverulenta (Schreb.) Poelt (1965)
- Physconia rossica Urbanav. (2008)
- Physconia sikkimensis (Jatta) D.D.Awasthi (2007)
- Physconia thorstenii A.Crespo & Divakar (2007)
