= Salavatsky District =

Salavatsky District Салаватский район (Russian)
- District

Other transcription(s)
  - Bashkir: Салауат районы
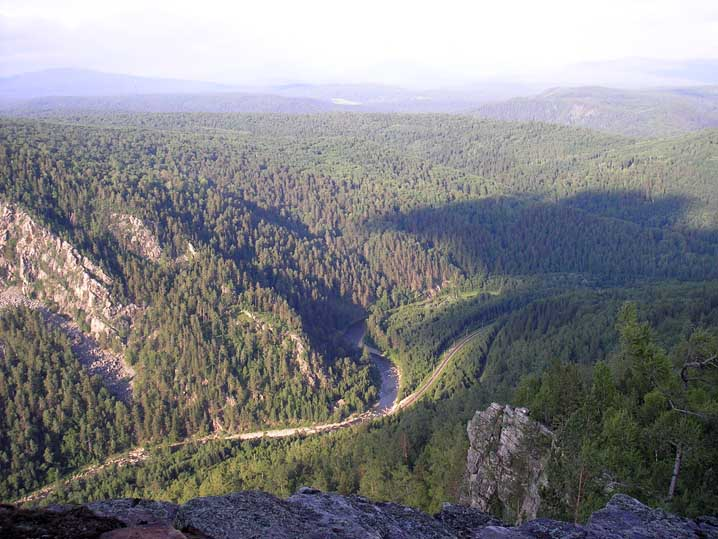
- Karatash Ridge, a protected area of Russia in Salavatsky District

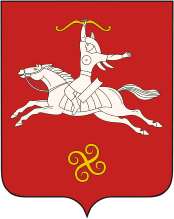
- Flag Coat of arms
- Location of Salavatsky District in the Republic of Bashkortostan
- Coordinates: 53°22′N 55°56′E
- Country: Russia
- Federal subject: Republic of Bashkortostan
- Established: January 31, 1935
- Administrative center: Maloyaz

Area
  - Total: 2,182 km^{2} (842 sq mi)

Population (2010 Census)
  - Total: 26,566
  - Estimate (2018): 23,871 (−10.1%)
  - Density: 12.18/km^{2} (31.53/sq mi)
  - Urban: 0%
  - Rural: 100%

Administrative structure
  - Administrative divisions: 16 Selsoviets
  - Inhabited localities: 60 rural localities

Municipal structure
  - Municipally incorporated as: Salavatsky Municipal District
  - Municipal divisions: 0 urban settlements, 16 rural settlements
- Time zone: UTC+5 (MSK+2)
- OKTMO ID: 80647000
- Website: https://admmaloyaz.bashkortostan.ru

Salavatsky District (Russian: Салава́тский райо́н; Bashkir: Салауат районы, Salawat rayonı) is an administrative and municipal district (raion), one of the fifty-four in the Republic of Bashkortostan, Russia. It is located in the northeast of the republic and borders Duvansky District in the north, Kiginsky District in the northeast, Chelyabinsk Oblast in the east, south, and west, and Nurimanovsky District in the west. The area of the district is 2,182 square kilometers (842 sq mi). Its administrative center is the rural locality (a selo) of Maloyaz. As of the 2010 Census, the total population of the district was 26,566, with the population of Maloyaz accounting for 18.5% of that number.

== History ==
The district was established on January 31, 1935 as Maloyazovsky District (Малоязовский район). On March 4, 1941, it was given its present name, in honor of Salawat Yulayev, a Bashkir national hero who was born in the village of Tikeyevo and who played a role in Pugachev's Rebellion.

== Administrative and municipal status ==
Within the framework of administrative divisions, Salavatsky District is one of the fifty-four in the Republic of Bashkortostan. The district is divided into sixteen selsoviets, comprising sixty rural localities. As a municipal division, the district is incorporated as Salavatsky Municipal District. Its sixteen selsoviets are incorporated as sixteen rural settlements within the municipal district. The selo of Maloyaz serves as the administrative center of both the administrative and municipal district.

== Demographics ==
Population of Salavatsky District
- 2010 Census: 26,566
- 2002 Census: 28,516
- 1989 Census: 26,897
- 1979 Census: 28,843

In terms of ethnic composition, 66% of the population are Bashkirs, 22% are Tatars, and 10% are Russians.
