= Maloyaz, Republic of Bashkortostan =

Maloyaz Малояз
- Selo
- Interactive map of Maloyaz
- Location of Maloyaz Maloyaz (Bashkortostan)
- Coordinates: 55°10′57″N 58°09′56″E
- Country: Russia
- Federal subject: Bashkortostan
- Administrative district: Salavatsky District
- Founded: 17th century

Population (2010 Census)
  - Total: 4,914

Administrative status
  - Capital of: Salavatsky District
- Time zone: UTC+5 (MSK+2)
- Postal codes: 452489, 452490
- OKTMO ID: 80647453101

Maloyaz (Russian: Малоя́з; Bashkir: Малаяҙ, Malayaź) is a rural locality (a selo) and the administrative center of Salavatsky District in the Republic of Bashkortostan, Russia, located on the Yuryuzan River. Population: 4,914 (2010 census); 4,764 (2002 census); 3,751 (1989 Soviet census).
