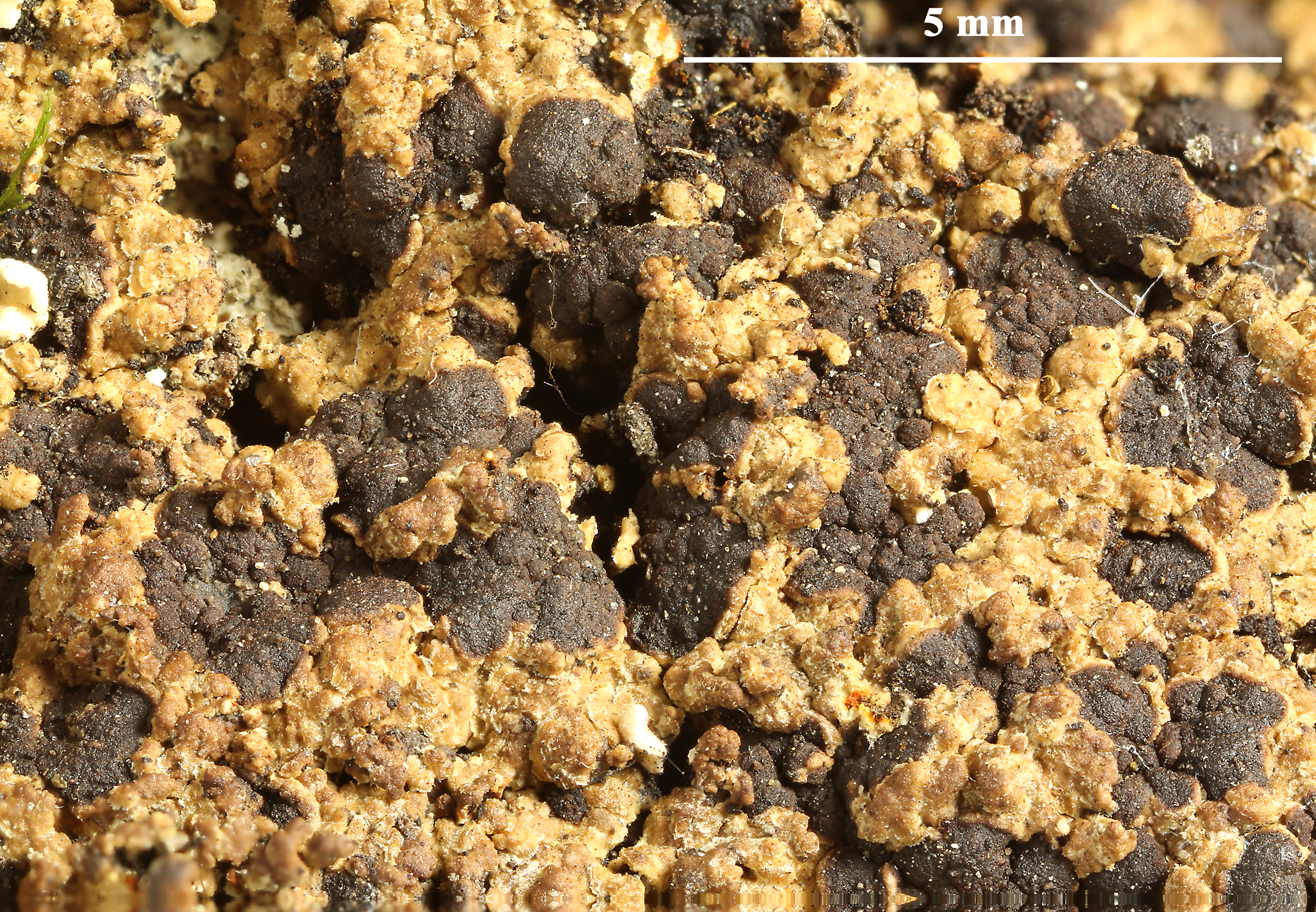
- Johnsheardia cinnamomea

Scientific classification
- Kingdom: Fungi
- Division: Ascomycota
- Class: Lecanoromycetes
- Order: Caliciales
- Family: Physciaceae
- Genus: Johnsheardia; S.Y.Kondr., Kärnefelt & A.Thell (2021)

Type species
- Johnsheardia cinnamomea (Th.Fr.) S.Y.Kondr., Kärnefelt & A.Thell (2021)

Species
- J. cinnamomea J. herteliana J. jamesii J. reagens J. zwackhiana

= Johnsheardia =

Genus of lichens

Johnsheardia is a genus of lichen-forming fungi in the family Physciaceae. It comprises five species that were previously included in the genus Rinodina. The genus was established in 2021 on the basis of molecular evidence showing that these species form a distinct evolutionary lineage, although this split has not been universally adopted by lichen taxonomists. Species are characterised by crustose thalli ranging from brownish grey to reddish brown, typically growing on moss cushions, plant litter, or calcareous rocks.

== Taxonomy ==
Johnsheardia is a segregate genus of the family Physciaceae that was introduced in 2021 by Sergey Kondratyuk, Ingvar Kärnefelt and Arne Thell as part of a broad DNA-based reassessment of the family. In their analyses, species belonging to the "Rinodina cinnamomea group" formed a well-supported monophyletic branch that did not cluster with Rinodina in the strict sense. On that basis the authors described Johnsheardia as a new genus and designated Johnsheardia cinnamomea as the type species. Several previously described species, including Rinodina herteliana, R. jamesii, R. reagens and Lecanora zwackhiana, were transferred to the new genus through formal new combinations.

In the resulting phylogeny, the Johnsheardia branch occupies a basal position within the Anaptychia–Physconia clade of the Physciaceae (in the broad sense), where it forms the sister group to branches containing Physconia, Anaptychia, Phaeorrhiza and Kurokawia. This placement is recovered in analyses of several independent molecular markers and supports recognition of Johnsheardia as a distinct lineage. Morphologically, the genus resembles Rinodina and Mischoblastia, but it is distinguished by having ascospore types assigned to the Physcia and Bicincta categories used in rinodinoid taxonomy, together with its phylogenetic position outside Rinodina. The generic name honours the Canadian lichenologist John Wilson Sheard for his extensive work on rinodinoid lichens.

Some taxonomic treatments, such as the Keys to the Lichens of Italy, retain a broad concept of Rinodina and do not accept Johnsheardia and other segregate genera proposed by Kondratyuk and colleagues.

== Description ==
Species of Johnsheardia have crustose thalli that range from rather thin to comparatively thick and are broken into areoles or cracked into small blocks (rimosely areolate). The thallus colour is typically in the brown range, from brownish grey or brownish green through to dark brown or reddish brown. In the type species the internal medulla is yellow to orange and gives a K+ (reddish-violet) reaction with potassium hydroxide solution, whereas other species have a white medulla. The thallus often sits on a dark, blackish hypothallus. Apothecia are usually abundant and form the main means of sexual reproduction.

The asci are of the Lecanora type, and the ascospores belong to the Physcia and Bicincta spore-type categories used in rinodinoid taxonomy rather than the Milvina type more typical of Rinodina. In the type species, thin-layer chromatography has detected skirin, atranorin, variolaric acid and anthraquinone pigments, whereas no lichen substances have yet been confirmed in the remaining species. In some taxa, the epihymenium reacts K+ and N+ (reddish violet), providing an additional diagnostic microscopic character.

== Habitat and distribution ==
Members of Johnsheardia are primarily terricolous or saxicolous lichens that grow over bryophyte cushions, plant litter and calcareous rock; only a single species in the genus is recorded as occurring on bark. These substrates include moss-covered soil and plant debris as well as base-rich rocks, and the crustose thalli may form patches among mosses or on rock faces.

Of the five recognised species, the type species J. cinnamomea has a wide distribution across the Northern Hemisphere. Johnsheardia zwackhiana is described as rare but has a similarly broad, though scattered, Northern Hemisphere range. Other species show more localised distributions: J. herteliana is reported from New Zealand, whereas J. jamesii and J. reagens are known from South Africa and New Zealand.

== Species ==
- Johnsheardia cinnamomea (Th.Fr.) S.Y.Kondr., Kärnefelt & A.Thell (2021)
- Johnsheardia herteliana (Kaschik) S.Y.Kondr., Kärnefelt & A.Thell (2021)
- Johnsheardia jamesii (H.Mayrhofer) S.Y.Kondr., Kärnefelt & A.Thell (2021)
- Johnsheardia reagens (Matzer & H.Mayrhofer) S.Y.Kondr., Kärnefelt & A.Thell (2021)
- Johnsheardia zwackhiana (Kremp.) S.Y.Kondr., Kärnefelt & A.Thell (2021)
