= Australiaena =

Scientific classification
- Kingdom: Fungi
- Division: Ascomycota
- Class: Lecanoromycetes
- Order: Caliciales
- Family: Caliciaceae
- Genus: Australiaena; Matzer, H.Mayrhofer & Elix (1997)
- Species: A. streimannii

Binomial name
- Australiaena streimannii Matzer, H.Mayrhofer & Elix (1997)

Single-species fungal genus

Australiaena is a fungal genus in the family Caliciaceae. It is a monospecific genus, containing the single species Australiaena streimannii, a crustose lichen. It occurs in northern Australia and Papua New Guinea, where it grows on silica-rich rocks. The genus was proposed in 1997 and named to reflect both its Australasian distribution and its superficial resemblance to the genus Dimelaena. The lichen forms variable-coloured crusts, ranging from whitish to grey, ochre or brown, with margins that often show distinctive radiating folds. It is distinguished from similar genera by its thread-like asexual spores and the unusual way its sexual spores (ascospores) develop.

== Taxonomy ==
Australiaena was described in 1997 by Mario Matzer, Helmut Mayrhofer and John Elix to accommodate an unusual crustose physcioid lichen that did not fit the circumscription of any existing genus in the Physciaceae. The authors described the genus as monospecific, with Australiaena streimannii designated as the type and only species. The generic concept was supported by a distinctive character set: a crustose thallus often with a radiate-plicate margin; asci of the Lecanora-type; and brown, 1-septate ascospores that develop with "type-B" ontogeny, meaning the internal wall thickens at the spore tips before the cross-wall forms. In addition, the genus produces filiform (thread-like) conidia rather than the short rod-shaped (bacilliform) conidia typical of many other physcioid genera. Collectively, these features set Australiaena apart from similar genera such as Dimelaena and Diploicia (which have rod-shaped conidia) and from the filiform-conidia genera Amandinea and Hyperphyscia (which differ in ascospore development).

The type species, A. streimannii, was based on material collected by Heinar Streimann at Robin Falls, Northern Territory (Australia), and the epithet honours him. The generic name combines australis ("southern") with Dimelaena, referring both to the Australasian range of the new genus and to its superficially similar, radiate-plicate growth form, which initially suggested a close relationship with Dimelaena. This apparent similarity was later shown to be misleading once spore development and conidial form were examined more closely. Matzer and colleagues also documented distinct chemical variation across specimens (several chemotypes), but found no consistent correlation between chemistry and either morphology or geography. Despite this variability, the constancy of the key reproductive characters was considered by the authors to justify the recognition of a separate, monospecific genus.

In one of the first broad molecular surveys of the Physciaceae, Helms, Friedl and Rambold (2003) sequenced the nuclear ribosomal internal transcribed spacer (ITS) region of the type species Australiaena streimannii and analysed it in a family-wide dataset. Their ITS phylogeny split the Physciaceae into two main lineages (clades A and B). Australiaena was recovered in clade B, within their "subclade IV", alongside buellioid genera such as Amandinea, Dimelaena, Dermatiscum, Hafellia and Santessonia. Support for subclade IV as a whole was low and relationships within it were only weakly resolved in these early ITS analyses.

Helms and co-authors drew attention to Australiaena as an exception to the usual character pattern of clade B: despite its position in subclade IV, it has a Lecanora-type ascus and can show ascospore wall thickenings, traits otherwise more typical of clade A. Using SSU rDNA data, they also recovered the Physciaceae and Caliciaceae as a single lineage and discussed scenarios in which the Caliciaceae could be sister to, or nested within, the subclade IV branch that included Australiaena.

== Description ==
Australiaena forms a crust that sits tight to the rock rather than making leaf-like lobes. The thallus is usually continuous and cracked into small blocks; its outer edge commonly shows radiating folds (a "radiate-plicate" margin). Colours are variable even within a single specimen; whitish, yellowish, ochre, various greys and brown occur. In cross section, there is a distinct upper cortex of tightly packed fungal cells; the algal partner forms a clear layer but cells can also be scattered through the white medulla. A lower cortex and root-like rhizines are absent, although a thick dark-brown layer often underlies the thallus. A brown to black prothallus may be present at the margin.

Fruiting bodies (apothecia) are small — about 0.2–0.6 (sometimes up to 1) mm across — and range from lecanorine (with a pale thallus-like rim) to biatorine (lacking a thallus rim). The rim is dark brown to black and the disc is typically dark brown to black, flat at first and later becoming slightly domed. Internally, the hymenium (spore-bearing layer) is 30–100 μm tall. The epihymenium above it is pale to mid-brown; the hypothecium below is usually colourless and can reach 150 μm. The slender paraphyses (sterile filaments that support the spore-bearing cells) are mostly 1–4 μm wide with slightly swollen tips to about 5 or 6 μm. Asci are of the Lecanora-type and typically hold eight spores. The ascospores are one-septate (divided by a single cross-wall), ellipsoid, and (grey-)brown when mature, measuring 7–19 × 4–8 μm. A key developmental feature is that internal thickenings form at the spore tips before the central cross-wall appears ("type-B" ontogeny). Spore surfaces are smooth to very finely roughened.

Asexual reproductive structures (spermogonia) are immersed in the thallus and may be plentiful, sparse, or absent; their openings can appear hyaline, brown, grey, or nearly black. They produce long, thread-like spermatia (filiform; 14–25 × 1 μm), rather than the short rod-shaped spermatia found in many related genera. Chemically, the species is variable and falls into three chemotypes detectable by thin-layer chromatography and spot tests: (I) lobaric acid (major) with conlobaric acid and chlorinated xanthones; (II) gyrophoric and lecanoric acids with 5-O-methylhiascic acid and a chlorinated xanthone; and (III) perlatolic acid (major). Standard spot reactions are mostly negative: the medulla is K−, KC− or briefly KC+ reddish before fading, and C−, P−.

== Habitat and distribution ==
Australiaena is confined to tropical Australasia, with records from Papua New Guinea and northern Australia, including the northern parts of Western Australia, the Northern Territory, and Queensland. It grows on hard, silica-rich rocks (quartzites), including sandstone. In Australia, collections come from a range of warm-season habitats, from moist monsoon forest to savannah and open, dry sclerophyll forest, where it can occur with the superficially similar Dimelaena elevata. In Western Australia, known lichen associates include the crustose species Amandinea pilbarensis, Buellia kimberleyana, and Caloplaca leptozona.

The lichen occupies a low-to-mid elevation range, with specimens gathered between roughly 80 and 450 m above sea level across the Kimberley, Top End and northern Queensland. Microhabitats include shaded rock faces near waterfalls as well as exposed escarpments and creek headwaters. The holotype, for example, was taken from a shaded rock face at Robin Falls in the Northern Territory, in creek-flat vegetation surrounded by eucalypt savannah.

Chemical forms (chemotypes) are intermingled geographically rather than segregated, reinforcing that these variants belong to one, widespread species.
