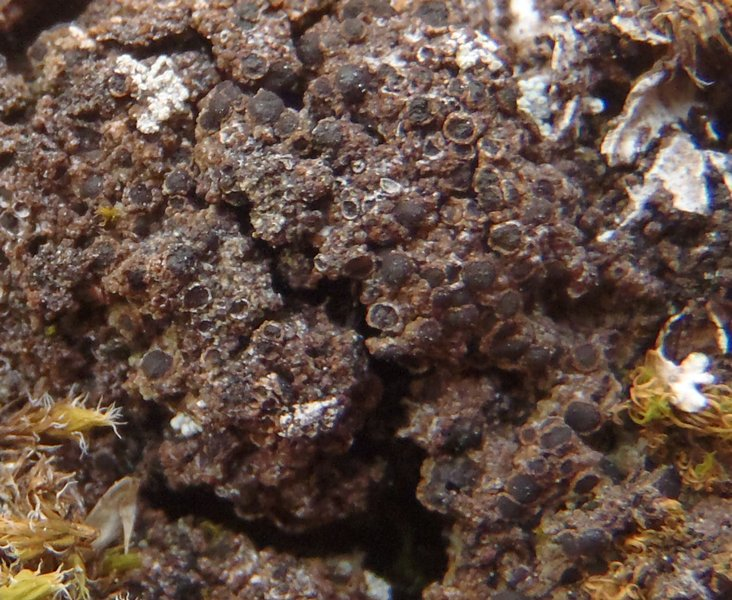
- Kudratovia terrestris growing over mosses on rock in subalpine meadow

Scientific classification
- Kingdom: Fungi
- Division: Ascomycota
- Class: Lecanoromycetes
- Order: Caliciales
- Family: Physciaceae
- Genus: Kudratovia; S.Y.Kondr., Lőkös & Hur (2021)

Type species
- Kudratovia straussii (J.Steiner) S.Y.Kondr., Lőkös & Hur (2021)

Species
- See text

= Kudratovia =

Genus of lichens

Kudratovia is a genus of lichen-forming fungi in the family Physciaceae. The genus was established in 2021 based on molecular evidence showing that several species previously placed in Rinodina and related genera form a distinct evolutionary lineage. Species in this group typically grow as whitish to grey crusts on limestone and other calcium-rich rocks in harsh environments such as arctic tundra, high mountains, and arid regions. The genus includes eight species distributed mainly across the Northern Hemisphere, particularly in Eurasia and arctic regions.

== Taxonomy ==
Kudratovia was introduced in 2021 by Sergey Kondratyuk and co-authors as part of a broad molecular reassessment of the family Physciaceae. The genus was erected for a well-supported monophyletic branch that had previously been treated within Rinodina and allied genera, and is typified by Kudratovia straussii (originally described as Rinodina straussii by Julius Steiner in 1910). Eight species were transferred to the new genus; under their original combinations they had been placed variously in Rinodina, Buellia and Lecanora.

Molecular phylogenetic analyses place Kudratovia within the "Phaeophyscia s. l." subclade of the Physciaceae, rather than with Rinodina in the strict sense. In trees inferred from ITS sequences alone the Kudratovia clade is sister to the Oxnerella and Rinodinella lineages, whereas in the combined dataset it nests in the Phaeophyscia-centred assemblage. Within the genus two main species groups are recognised: a K. straussii group (K. straussii, K. bohlinii, K. metaboliza, K. pycnocarpa, K. luridata and K. terrestris) and a K. roscida group comprising the fertile K. roscida and the sorediate K. candidogrisea, which form a closely related species pair. The transfer of these taxa to Kudratovia also resolved several earlier GenBank records where sequences filed under names such as "Rinodina lecanorina" were shown to belong to K. luridata. Kondratyuk and colleagues' division of Rinodina into smaller segregate genera has not been accepted by all taxonomists.

== Description ==
Species of Kudratovia have a crustose thallus that ranges from thin and largely endolithic (immersed in the rock) to more conspicuous, epilithic crusts. The thallus is usually areolate to squamulose and may be umbilicate or weakly lobate towards the margins. Colours are typically whitish to grey, sometimes becoming slightly yellowish or brownish, and some species develop a powdery or crystalline pruina on the thallus surface. In section, the cortex has a paraplectenchymatous structure, while the medulla is often indistinct and may contain crystals of calcium oxalate.

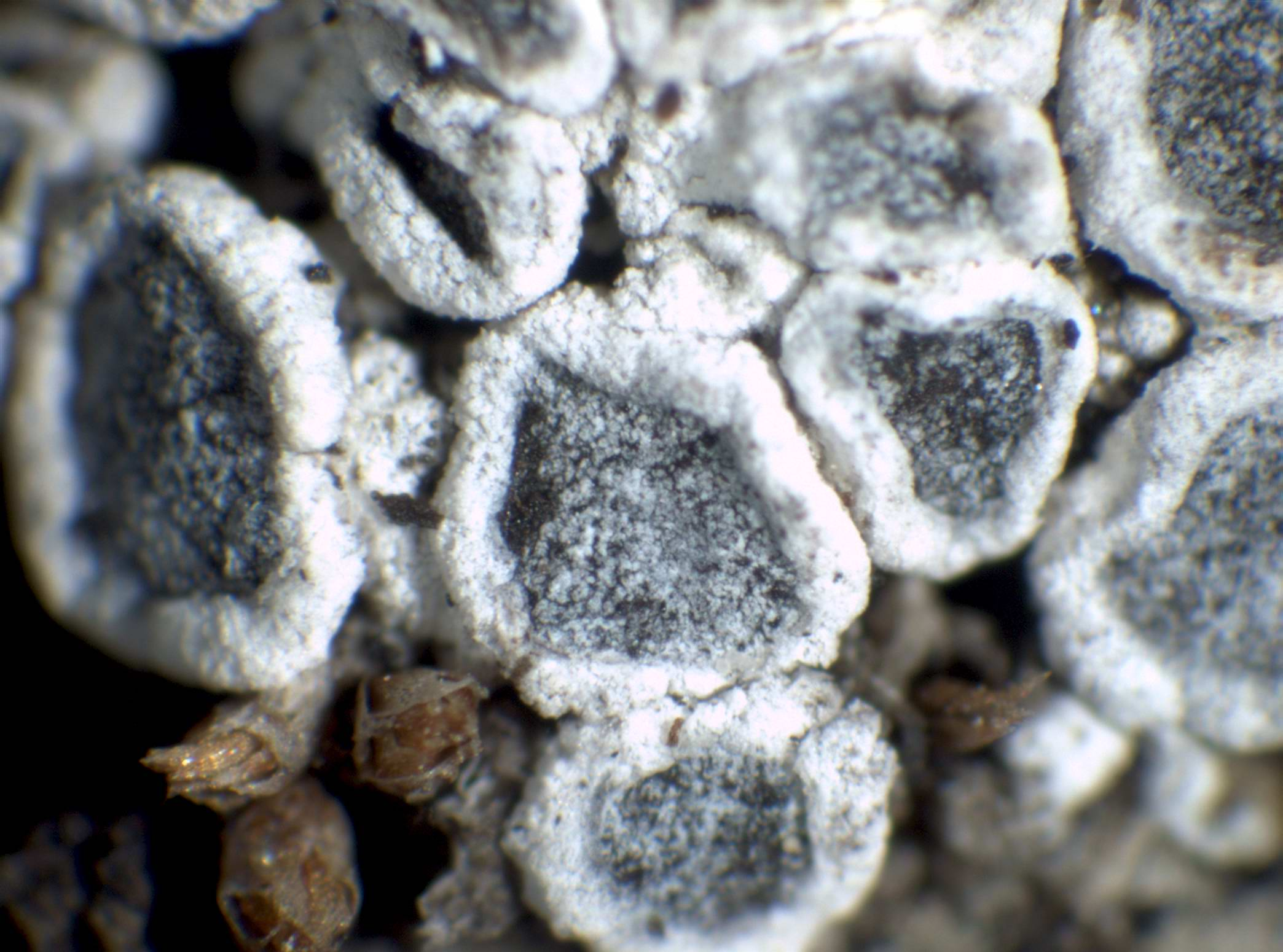
Closeup of Kudratovia roscida apothecia with crystalline surface pruina

Apothecia (fruiting bodies) are lecanorine in form, with a rim formed by the surrounding thallus; in some specimens this thalline margin becomes reduced with age. The discs may be pruinose or non-pruinose. Ascospores are of Bicincta- or Physcia-type within the Physciaceae spore terminology, and in K. terrestris they may show elongate, hyaline ends. Conidia are simple and rod-shaped (bacilliform). Chemically, the thallus commonly contains the triterpenoid compound zeorin in varying amounts, sometimes accompanied by small quantities of variolaric acid and at least one unidentified fatty acid; in some specimens no lichen substances are detectable by thin-layer chromatography.

== Habitat and distribution ==
Kudratovia species grow predominantly on calcareous substrates. They are most often found on carbonate rocks, including calcareous sandstone, but may also occur over moss cushions or plant litter and, more rarely, directly on calcium-rich soil. The genus is associated with relatively harsh environments, especially arid regions and high-elevation alpine settings, where its species colonise exposed mineral surfaces.

The genus comprises eight species with mainly Holarctic and Eurasian distributions. Kudratovia roscida is widespread in arctic and alpine ecosystems across the Northern Hemisphere, whereas K. straussii and K. luridata are so far known from mountain regions of Eurasia. Several species appear to be confined to Asia, including K. bohlinii, K. pycnocarpa and K. terrestris, while K. candidogrisea is reported from the Alps as a sorediate counterpart of K. roscida.

== Species ==
As of November 2025, eight species are accepted in Kudratovia:

- Kudratovia bohlinii (H.Magn.) S.Y.Kondr., Lőkös & Hur (2021)
- Kudratovia candidogrisea (Hafellner, Muggia & Obermayer) S.Y.Kondr., Lőkös & Hur (2021)
- Kudratovia luridata (Körb.) S.Y.Kondr., Lőkös & Hur (2021)
- Kudratovia metaboliza (Vain.) S.Y.Kondr., Lőkös & Hur (2021)
- Kudratovia pycnocarpa (H.Magn.) S.Y.Kondr., Lőkös & Hur (2021)
- Kudratovia roscida (Sommerf.) S.Y.Kondr., Lőkös & Hur (2021)
- Kudratovia straussii (J.Steiner) S.Y.Kondr., Lőkös & Hur (2021)
- Kudratovia terrestris (Tomin) S.Y.Kondr., Lőkös & Hur (2021)
