= Orcularia =

Scientific classification
- Domain: Eukaryota
- Kingdom: Fungi
- Division: Ascomycota
- Class: Lecanoromycetes
- Order: Caliciales
- Family: Caliciaceae
- Genus: Orcularia (Malme) Kalb & Giralt (2011)

Type species
- Orcularia insperata (Nyl.) Kalb & Giralt (2011)

Species
- O. elixii O. insperata O. placodiomorpha O. placodiomorphoides

Synonyms
- Rinodina sect. Orcularia Malme (1902)

Genus of lichens in the family Caliciaceae

Orcularia is a genus of four species of crustose lichens in the family Caliciaceae. The genus was originally described as part of another lichen group in 1902 by the Swedish botanist Gustaf Malme, but was elevated to its own genus in 2011 when researchers determined it had sufficiently unique characteristics. These lichens are distinguished by their unusual spore development, where the side walls thicken before the dividing wall forms, creating distinctive bone-shaped immature spores found nowhere else in their family. The four species grow as thin, often barely visible crusts on tree bark in humid coastal and mountain environments, producing small black fruiting bodies and thread-like reproductive structures.

== Taxonomy ==
The genus was originally circumscribed as a section of the genus Rinodina by Swedish botanist Gustaf Malme in 1902. Klaus Kalb and Mireia Giralt promoted it to generic status in 2011. Orcularia is characterized by the presence of ascospores that develop in such a way that the septum is inserted after lateral wall thickenings become distinct, and also by threadlike (filiform) conidia.

== Taxonomy ==
The name Orcularia was coined by Malme in 1902 as a sectional rank within the crustose lichen genus Rinodina; his concept was based entirely on the Brazilian taxon now called O. insperata and on the presence of small, two-celled spores with an unusually long central canal and a brown hypothecium. More than a century later Klaus Kalb and Mireia Giralt examined an extensive set of herbarium collections and concluded that these fungi differ sufficiently from both Rinodina (which normally has a thalline apothecial margin and Physciaceae-type spores) and Buellia (whose apothecia lack a thalline margin) to warrant separation at generic level. They therefore raised Malme's section to genus rank as Orcularia (Malme) Kalb & Giralt in 2011 and selected O. insperata as the type species.

Kalb and Giralt emphasised two diagnostic features that set Orcularia apart: (i) filiform (thread-like) conidia and (ii) "Orcularia-type" ascospores, whose thick lateral walls develop before the cross-wall (septum) is laid down. This ontogeny is unique within the Physciaceae–Caliciaceae complex and contrasts with the Physconia-type ontogeny seen in many species of Amandinea to which some Orcularia taxa had previously been assigned. Although thick-walled polarilocular spores usually signal a placement in the Physciaceae, Kalb and Giralt argued for inclusion in the Caliciaceae because Orcularia possesses a pigmented hypothecium and Bacidia-type asci—features typical of that family—and because preliminary molecular work had shown that Buellia-like lineages with similar characters nest in the Caliciaceae.

Four corticolous species were accepted in the protologue: the widespread O. insperata, the Australian O. elixii, and the neotropical pair O. placodiomorpha and O. placodiomorphoides. They are separated chiefly by spore length and the presence or absence of additional septal lumina, with O. insperata and O. elixii retaining two chambers at maturity and the other two species developing four. Subsequent surveys have confirmed that Orcularia is globally scattered but uncommon, most frequently encountered on bark in humid coastal or montane habitats.

== Description ==
Orcularia species form a thin, often inconspicuous crust on bark or wood that may be whitish, pale grey or even vanish almost completely with age; in some collections the thallus is reduced to a faint dusting that blends into the substrate. When present, the photosynthetic partner is a single-celled green alga (chlorococcoid photobiont). The small black fruit bodies (apothecia) first force their way through the crust surrounded by a rim of thallus tissue that mimics an ordinary lecanorine margin, but as the apothecia mature this false rim erodes so that the discs become sessile and edged only by a very thin proper margin. The apothecial wall is poorly developed: its outer layer is brown and consists of hyphae with slightly swollen cells, while the inner layer is colourless and merges seamlessly with the clear hymenium. Beneath the hymenium lies a shallow brown hypothecium. Thread-like paraphyses stand among eight-spored, Bacidia-type asci; their tips are modestly swollen and capped by a dark-brown pigment.

The genus is set apart by its distinctive "Orcularia-type" spores. Young spores begin as single cells whose side walls thicken before the dividing cross-wall (septum) forms; this development produces immature, bone-shaped spores that are unique within the Caliciaceae. At maturity each spore is pale to olive-brown, smooth-walled, and narrowly citriform (lemon-shaped) with sharp, mucronate ends. Most species have two main chambers connected by a narrow canal (polarilocular), while a few develop an extra tiny chamber at the septum so the spore becomes four-celled. Because the septum remains thin, the lumina appear long and tunnel-like. Typical measurements range from about 12 × 6 μm in O. elixii to 25 × 11 μm in O. placodiomorphoides. Vegetative reproduction occurs by means of flask-shaped pycnidia that release colourless, thread-like (filiform) conidia. Chemical tests are negative in many specimens, yet individual species may contain xanthones, the depsidone compounds myeloconone D1, norstictic acid, or other minor compounds detected through thin-layer or high-performance liquid chromatography.

== Species ==
- Orcularia elixii Kalb & Giralt (2011)
- Orcularia insperata (Nyl.) Kalb & Giralt (2011)
- Orcularia placodiomorpha (Vain.) Kalb & Giralt (2011)
- Orcularia placodiomorphoides (Imshaug) Kalb & Giralt (2011)
