= Mobergia =

Scientific classification
- Domain: Eukaryota
- Kingdom: Fungi
- Division: Ascomycota
- Class: Lecanoromycetes
- Order: Caliciales
- Family: Physciaceae
- Genus: Mobergia; H.Mayrhofer, Sheard & Matzer (1992)

Type species
- Mobergia calculiformis (W.A.Weber) H.Mayrhofer & Sheard (1992)

Genus of lichenized fungi

Mobergia is a genus of lichen-forming fungi in the family Physciaceae.

The genus name of Mobergia is in honour of Jan Roland Moberg (b.1939), a Swedish botanist (Mycology and Lichenology) and at the Museum of Evolution, Uppsala University.

The genus was circumscribed by Helmut Mayrhofer and John Wilson Sheard in Bryologist vol.95 on page 438 in 1992.
