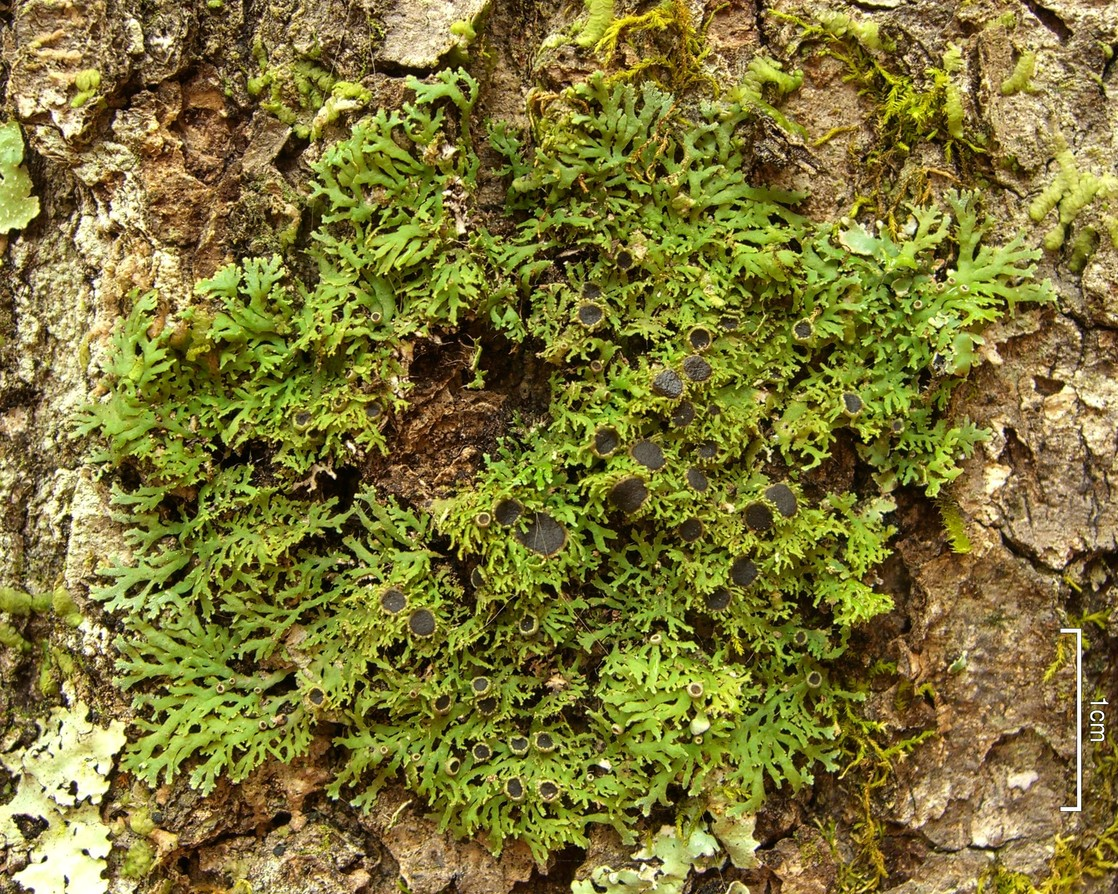

Scientific classification
- Domain: Eukaryota
- Kingdom: Fungi
- Division: Ascomycota
- Class: Lecanoromycetes
- Order: Caliciales
- Family: Physciaceae
- Genus: Kurokawia
- Species: K. palmulata

Binomial name
- Kurokawia palmulata (Michx.) S.Y.Kondr., Lőkös & Hur (2021)

Synonyms
- List: Psoroma palmulatum Michx. (1803); Lecanora palmulata (Michx.) Ach. (1810); Lichen peltatus * palmulata (Michx.) Lam. (1813); Parmelia palmulata (Michx.) Spreng. (1827); Physcia palmulata (Michx.) Nyl. (1890); Anaptychia palmulata (Michx.) Vain. (1899); Pseudophyscia aquila var. palmulata (Michx.) Hue (1899)

= Kurokawia palmulata =

Species of lichen

Kurokawia palmulata, the shaggy fringe lichen, is a species of corticolous (bark-dwelling), foliose lichen in the family Physciaceae.

== Taxonomy ==
It was formally described as a new species in 1803 by French botanist André Michaux, who named it Psoroma palmulatum. In its taxonomic history, it has been proposed for placement in the genera Lecanora, Parmelia, and Physcia. In 1899, Edvard August Vainio transferred it to the genus Anaptychia, and it was known as a member of this genus until 2021, when Sergey Kondratyuk and colleagues transferred it to the newly circumscribed genus Kurokawia . In North America, it is commonly known as the "shaggy fringe lichen".

== Description ==
Kurokawia palmulata is recognisable by its foliose thallus, which is typically appressed and can grow up to 9–10 cm (3 1/2–4 in) in diameter. The colour varies from brownish-grey to tan-brown. Its lobes are elongated and linear, branching irregularly, and they remain mostly flat at the ends. Unlike some other lichens, Kurokawia palmulata does not possess soredia or isidia. However, it often develops lateral secondary lobules. The lichen's lower surface starts off white or off-white and gradually darkens to a tawny or light brown shade. A noticeable feature is the superimposed layer of hyphae, which does not carry rhizines. Commonly, Kurokawia palmulata will present with apothecia, which are laminal and can grow up to 4 mm in diameter.

The chemical spot test reactions of the lichen often reveal a K+ (yellow) reaction on the upper surface, making it distinctive. The presence of variolaric acid has also been observed. However, the strength and prominence of these reactions can vary between specimens.

=== Similar species ===
The distinct chemical reactions of Kurokawia palmulata to spot tests, especially when it comes to the excipular spot tests, coupled with its colour and morphology, make it stand out from other lichen species. However, care must be taken not to confuse it with similar-looking species like Physconia subpallida – which lacks the positive spot tests that are characteristic of Kurokawia palmulata. Another differentiation point is the cortex structure of these lichens, with Kurokawia palmulata having a prosoplectenchymatous upper cortex. Some species of Heterodermia and Physcia are similar, but they can be distinguished by their K+ (yellow) upper surface spot test reaction, which indicates the presence of atranorin.

== Habitat and distribution ==
Endemic to eastern North America and eastern Asia, Kurokawia palmulata has been found to have a strong affinity for the bark of hardwood trees. However, it can also establish itself on rock surfaces, either directly or overlying mosses. The species is particularly prevalent in areas corresponding to the eastern deciduous forest. Additionally, a correlation has been noted between the geographical distribution of the lichen and the squarroseness of its rhizines – specimens from the southern range tend to have less squarrose rhizines compared to those from the north. Its North America range was extended considerably when it was recorded from Ohio–the first report from western North America. Its range extends north to southern Ontario, and the coniferous old-growth forests of southwestern Nova Scotia in Canada.
