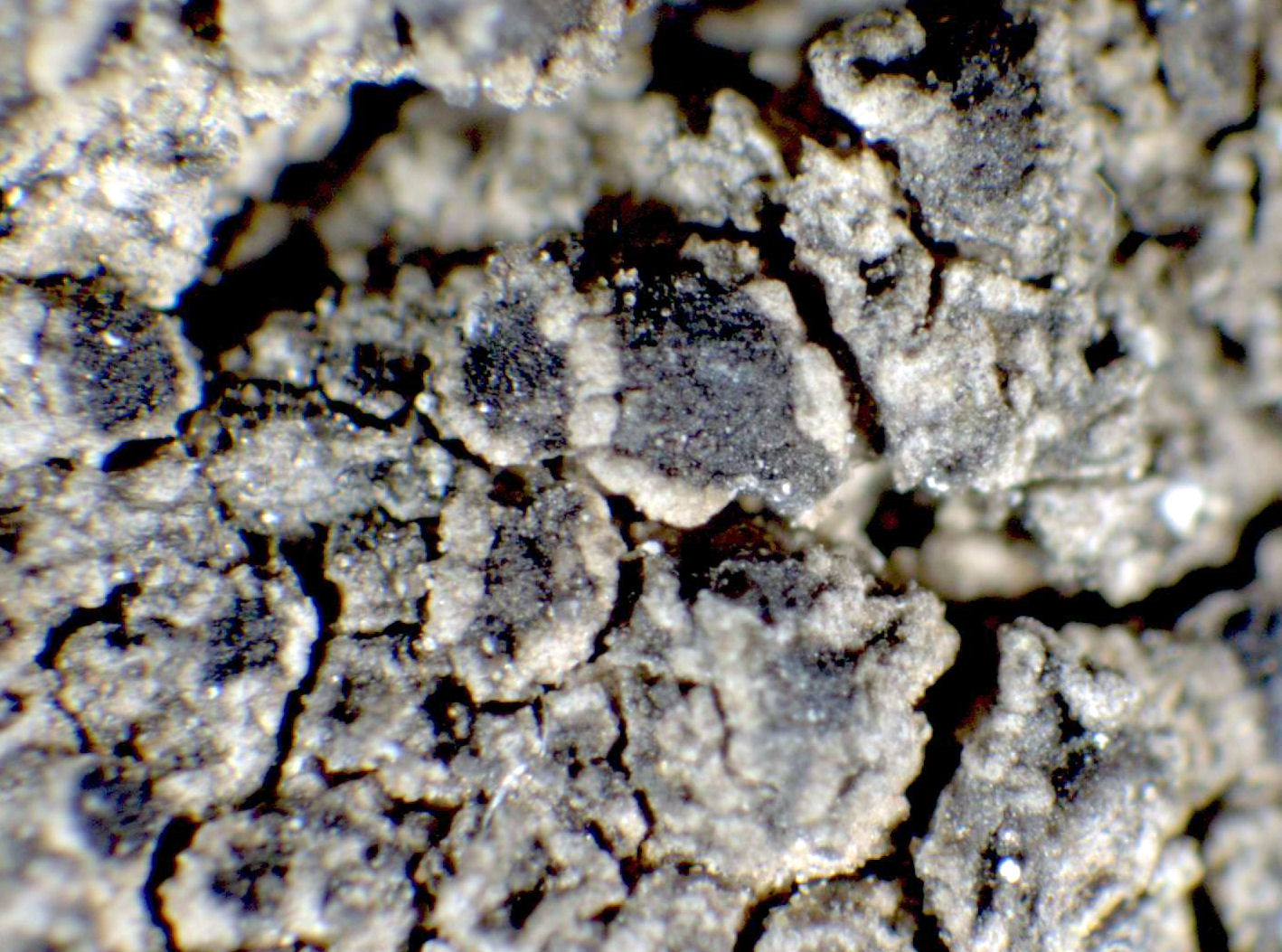
- Huriopsis plana

Scientific classification
- Kingdom: Fungi
- Division: Ascomycota
- Class: Lecanoromycetes
- Order: Caliciales
- Family: Physciaceae
- Genus: Huriopsis; S.Y.Kondr. & Lőkös (2021)

Type species
- Huriopsis xanthophaea (Nyl.) S.Y.Kondr. & Lőkös (2021)

Species
- H. chrysidiata H. lepida H. luteonigra H. plana H. thiomela H. xanthomelana H. xanthophaea

= Huriopsis =

Genus of lichens

Huriopsis is a genus of lichen-forming fungi in the family Physciaceae. The genus was established in 2021 through molecular phylogenetics analysis that revealed the polyphyletic nature of the traditional genus Rinodina. Species of Huriopsis are characterised by their distinctive golden-yellow thalli and the presence of xanthone pigments, particularly thiomelin.

== Taxonomy ==
Huriopsis was introduced in 2021 by Sergey Kondratyuk and László Lőkös as part of a broad molecular re-evaluation of the Physciaceae. It was carved out of the polyphyletic catch-all Rinodina to accommodate the "Rinodina xanthophaea" group, with Huriopsis xanthophaea designated as the type species and the genus name honouring Jae-Seoun Hur. The authors justified the segregation on a mix of molecular and diagnostic characters: species of Huriopsis typically have a citrine (golden-yellow) thallus or yellow-green soralia, thick-walled (Pachysporaria-type) ascospores, and xanthone pigments such as thiomelin in the cortex or medulla. These features set them apart from superficially similar Rinodina taxa.

== Description ==
Species of Huriopsis are crustose lichens with a thin to moderately thick thallus (lichen body) that is golden yellow to grey, either continuous or broken into small areoles, with a matt, even surface. Asexual propagules may be present or absent; when present they are typically yellow-green. Powdery reproductive patches (soralia) commonly begin as narrow, lip-like breaks along the margin and round off into small circular spots, sometimes becoming pustular. The powder (soredia) can clump into larger granules that may form tiny bud-like fragments; true isidia (minute surface outgrowths) also occur in some species. A black prothallus is usual, forming a neat border that can become thick and ragged where the lichen spreads over other crusts or foliose lichens.

Sexual structures, when produced, are small apothecia attached by a narrow base; the disc is plane and dark reddish-brown, with a rim of thallus tissue matching the thallus colour that remains flexuous and persistent. Orange-red crystals occur in the cortex of the apothecial rim and in the medulla and can obscure tissue detail. Ascospores show "type A" development and are of the Physcia- or Pachysporaria-type, with smooth walls. Chemically, the genus contains xanthone pigments (thiomelin in some taxa) and usually secalonic acid A or W, sometimes with traces of atranorin; routine spot tests are typically K−, C+ (yellow-orange), KC+ (yellow-orange), P−, and UV+ (dull orange). In combination with the yellow thallus or yellow-green soralia, these characters distinguish Huriopsis from superficially similar Rinodina.

== Species ==
- Huriopsis chrysidiata (Sheard) S.Y.Kondr. & Lőkös (2021)
- Huriopsis lepida (Nyl.) S.Y.Kondr. & Lőkös (2021)
- Huriopsis luteonigra (Zahlbr.) S.Y.Kondr. & Lőkös (2021)
- Huriopsis plana (H.Magn.) S.Y.Kondr. & Lőkös (2021)
- Huriopsis thiomela (Nyl.) S.Y.Kondr. & Lőkös (2021)
- Huriopsis xanthomelana (Müll.Arg.) S.Y.Kondr. & Lőkös (2021)
- Huriopsis xanthophaea (Nyl.) S.Y.Kondr. & Lőkös (2021)

One of the proposed recombinations, Huriopsis chrysomelaena, based on Erik Acharius's 1814 Lecanora chrysomelaena, was invalidly published. In the protologue the basionym was cited as "Rinodina chrysomelaena Tuck., Genera Lichenum (Amherst): 123 (1872)", rather than giving a full and direct reference to the place of publication of the true basionym (Acharius, 1814) as required by Article 41.5 of the Shenzhen Code; accordingly Index Fungorum lists the name as nomen invalidum.
