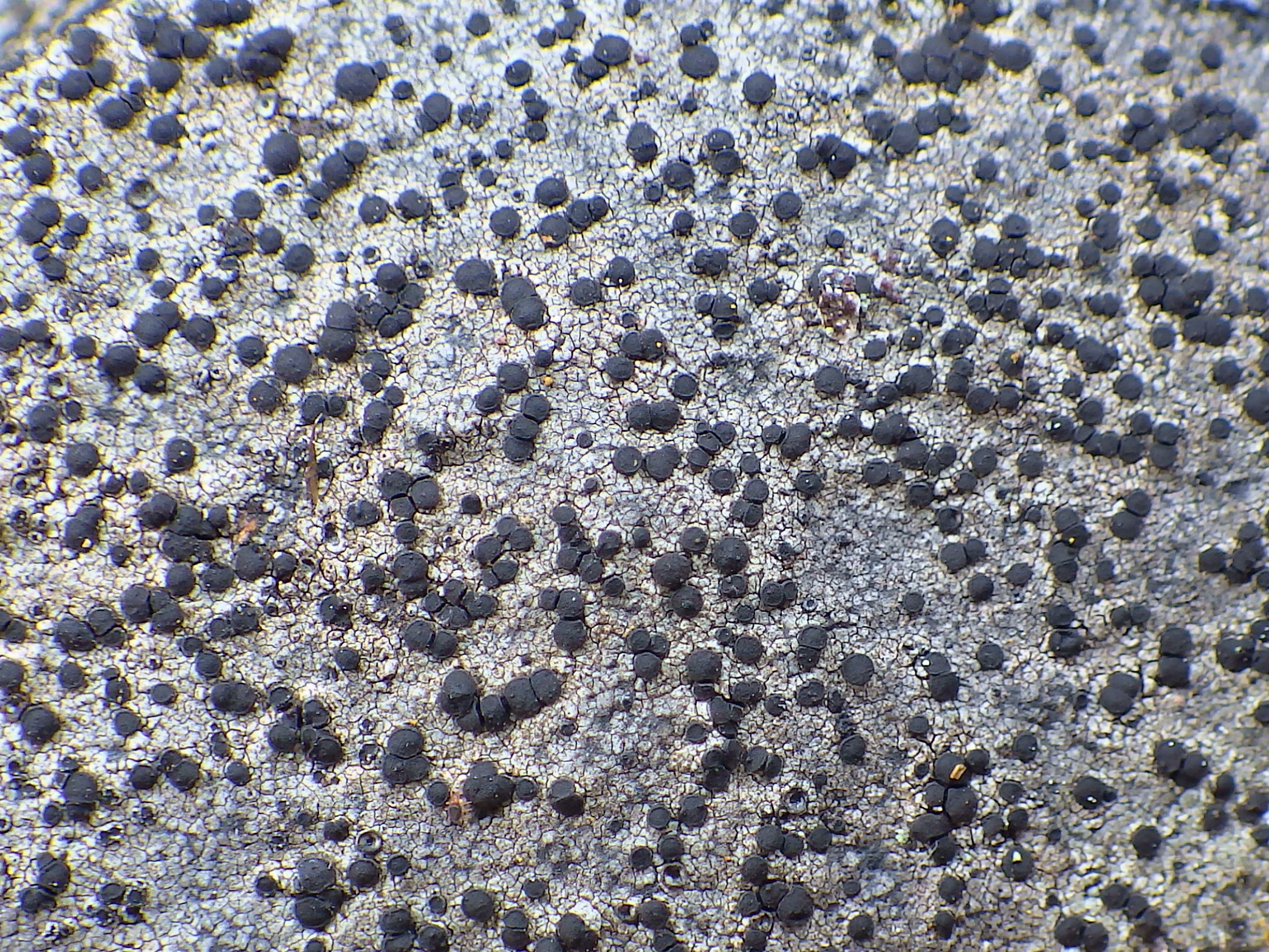
- Mischoblastia oxydata

Scientific classification
- Kingdom: Fungi
- Division: Ascomycota
- Class: Lecanoromycetes
- Order: Caliciales
- Family: Physciaceae
- Genus: Mischoblastia; A.Massal. (1852)

Type species
- Mischoblastia oxydata A.Massal. (1852)

Species
- M. confragosula M. destituta M. moziana M. oxydata M. physciospora M. ramboldii M. vezdae

= Mischoblastia =

Genus of lichen-forming fungi

Mischoblastia is a genus of lichen-forming fungi in the family Physciaceae. It was first established as a separate genus in 1852, but was later treated as part of Rinodina. Molecular studies published in 2021 showed that Mischoblastia forms its own distinct evolutionary lineage within the Physciaceae. The genus is characterised by distinctive ascospores with strongly thickened walls that create an almost triangular internal cavity during development, and by species that occur mainly on rocks across several continents, including North America, Europe, Asia, and Africa. The diversity in East Asia is probably underestimated because of limited sampling.

== Taxonomy ==
The genus Mischoblastia was introduced by Abramo Bartolommeo Massalongo in 1852 to accommodate two crustose lichens, Mischoblastia oxydata and M. lecanorina, which he separated from other physcioid taxa on the basis of their distinctive ascospore morphology, later termed the "Mischoblastia-type". Massalongo's concept was subsequently expanded when M. physciospora was added, but this species has never been sequenced and its placement remains based entirely on morphology. In their review of Physciaceae phylogeny, Sergey Kondratyuk and co-authors designated M. oxydata as the type species of the genus and re-evaluated its limits using nuclear ribosomal internal transcribed spacer (nrITS) sequence data.

In the nrITS-only phylogeny, Mischoblastia forms a well-supported, monophyletic branch that lies close to the Hyperphyscia lineage and the Rinodina bischoffii group within the Phaeophyscia sensu lato part of the phylogenetic tree, lending support to its recognition as a separate genus within Physciaceae. This "core" Mischoblastia clade comprises M. oxydata, M. destituta and M. vezdae, with South Korean material referred to as M. aff. oxydata and the species M. ramboldii falling into the same region of the tree but with weaker statistical support. On morphological and molecular grounds Kondratyuk nd colleagues adopted a somewhat broader generic concept, making new combinations for M. confragosula, M. moziana (with M. moziana subsp. moziana and the lichenicolous M. moziana subsp. parasitica) and M. ramboldii, and treating M. moziana subsp. parasitica as closely allied to the core species complex. At the same time, they showed that sequenced material labelled "Mischoblastia lecanorina" actually belongs to Kudratovia luridata or Rinodina parvula, leaving the true identity and generic placement of M. lecanorina unresolved pending fresh collections and additional gene regions. Overall, the authors regard the taxonomy of Mischoblastia, particularly in East Asia, as still incomplete, and emphasise that broader sampling and multilocus data will be needed to stabilise species limits within the genus.

== Description ==
In John Sheard's 2010 revision of Rinodina, the species now treated in Mischoblastia were placed in his "Mischoblastia-group", which comprised five species, all but one growing on rock (saxicolous), with R. wetmorei occurring on bark. He also recorded other lichens with Mischoblastia-type spores on bark, including R. euskadiensis from Spain and the corticolous, tropical Buellia japonica, showing that this spore type is not confined to rock-dwelling species. Within this group the apothecia are innate to broadly attached, with a poorly developed proper exciple (the ring of fungal tissue around the disc) and a light brown to orange-brown epihymenium, the pigmented upper layer of the spore-bearing tissue. In R. oxydata and R. destituta the apothecial margins are very variable: they may begin as typical thalline (lecanorine) rims that include algal cells, but as the apothecia age these margins can lose their algae, become more strongly pigmented and take on a dark, lecideine aspect. In many members of the group the outer part of the proper exciple may contain an aeruginous pigment known as Bagliettoana-green, which gives a characteristic N+ (red) reaction in chemical spot tests and also occurs in species with other spore types, so it cannot on its own be used to define the group.

The central character uniting the group is the Mischoblastia-type ascospore as defined by Malme in 1902. These spores show very strong wall thickenings both at the internal cross-wall (septum) and at the rounded ends, so that during development the internal cavities (lumina) appear almost triangular, becoming more rounded as the spores mature. Their walls are usually only lightly pigmented, and they follow a Type A pattern of development. Average spore size in this group ranges from about 18.5–19.0 μm × 10.5–11.5 μm in R. oxydata to 22.0–22.5 μm × 12.0–12.5 μm in R. destituta, with a length-to-width ratio of two or less in all species, giving relatively short, broad spores. The asci that bear these spores tend to show features of the Bacidia-type, or are intermediate between the Lecanora- and Bacidia-types, and in molecular analyses Sheard's Mischoblastia-group appears relatively isolated within Rinodina. Taken together—substrate preferences, apothecial anatomy, the occurrence of Bagliettoana-green in parts of the exciple, and the distinctive Mischoblastia-type ascospores in Bacidia-like asci—these features characterise the Mischoblastia-group as circumscribed by Sheard.

== Habitat and distribution ==
In his North American revision of Rinodina, Sheard treated a "Mischoblastia-group" of five species, four growing on rock (saxicolous) and one on bark, indicating that species now placed in Mischoblastia are primarily rock-dwelling crustose lichens but can occasionally occur on tree bark. Under the reinstated and broadened generic concept of Kondratyuk and co-authors, Mischoblastia includes species recorded from several regions of the world: M. moziana subsp. parasitica is reported from New Zealand, South Korean material referred to as M. aff. oxydata extends the range in East Asia, and M. confragosula, originally described from South Africa, is now known from several continents and was newly reported from Cambodia, while M. moziana shows an eastern North American–eastern Asian–European distribution. Kondratyuk and colleagues note that East Asian members of the genus remain poorly sampled, so the known diversity and range of Mischoblastia are likely to expand with further collecting and molecular study.

== Species ==
- Mischoblastia confragosula (Nyl.) S.Y.Kondr., Lőkös & Hur (2021)
- Mischoblastia destituta (Nyl.) S.Y.Kondr., Lőkös & Hur (2021)
- Mischoblastia moziana (Nyl.) S.Y.Kondr., Lőkös & Hur (2021)
- Mischoblastia oxydata A.Massal. (1852)
- Mischoblastia physciospora (M.Choisy & Werner) M.Choisy & Werner (1932)
- Mischoblastia ramboldii (Kaschik) S.Y.Kondr., Lőkös & Hur (2021)
- Mischoblastia vezdae (H.Mayrhofer) S.Y.Kondr., Lőkös & Hur (2021)
