= Amandinea pilbarensis =

Scientific classification
- Domain: Eukaryota
- Kingdom: Fungi
- Division: Ascomycota
- Class: Lecanoromycetes
- Order: Caliciales
- Family: Caliciaceae
- Genus: Amandinea
- Species: A. pilbarensis

Binomial name
- Amandinea pilbarensis Elix (2020)

Species of lichen

Amandinea pilbarensis is a little-known species of crustose lichen in the family Physciaceae, First described in 2020, it is found in Australia. It is similar to Amandinea polyxanthonica, but can be distinguished by its smaller ascospores and the presence of calcium oxalate and thiophanic acid in the medulla.

== Taxonomy ==
Amandinea pilbarensis was formally described by the Australian lichenologist John Elix in 2020. The type specimen was collected in the Pilbara region of Western Australia, 27 km (17 mi) southwest of the De Grey River, east of Port Hedland, on siliceous rock. The specimen was collected by Alexander Clifford Beauglehole in August 1965. The species name refers to its type locality.

== Description ==
Amandinea pilbarensis is characterised by a crustose (crust-like), rimose (cracked)-areolate (divided into small areas) thallus, which can spread up to 15 mm wide and 0.1 mm thick. Angular to irregularly shaped individual areoles (small, discrete patches) range from 0.1 to 0.5 mm wide, with the tendency to become weakly radiate (spreading out) at the margin. Its upper surface, white to pale cream in colour, is matt (not shiny) and lacks a prothallus. Containing calcium oxalate, the medulla (internal layer) appears white. Cells of the photobiont (symbiotic green algae) measure 6–12 μm in diameter.

Ranging from 0.1 to 0.4 mm wide, the apothecia (fruiting bodies) are lecideine in form (having certain disc and margin characteristics), transitioning from immersed to broadly adnate (attached flatly), sometimes appearing sessile (without a stalk) and constricted at the base, dispersed, rounded. Black and epruinose (not powdery), the disc is either plane (flat) or becomes convex with age. The thin, persistent proper exciple (outer rim of the apothecium) often has adhering necrotic thalline (lichen body) fragments. In a sectional view, the outer zone is dark brown, cupuliform (cup-shaped) and measures 20–30 μm thick; the inner zone is pale brown to colourless.

The brown epihymenium (uppermost layer of the apothecium) measures 5–8 μm thick. Colourless to pale brown, the hypothecium (layer beneath the hymenium) has a thickness of 40–60 μm. With a thickness of 38–48 μm, the colourless hymenium (spore-bearing layer) is not inspersed, and the subhymenium (layer beneath the hymenium) shares similar characteristics, being 10–15 μm thick and colourless. Sparsely branched paraphyses (filament-like structures in the hymenium) have a width of 1.2–2 μm, with apices 3–5 μm wide and brown caps. The Bacidia-type asci typically contain eight spores. Mature ascospores (spores produced in asci) are Buellia-type, pale brown to brown, ellipsoid, measuring 8–13 by 5–7 μm, and show constriction at the septum (division); the outer spore-wall is smooth. Immersed pycnidia (asexual reproductive structures) have a black ostiole (opening). Measuring 12–20 by 0.7 μm, the conidia (asexual spores) are filiform (thread-like), curved.

Amandinea santantaoensis is somewhat similar in appearance to A. pilbarensis, but differs in having a pale yellow to pale yellow-brown surface colour; longer, curved conidia measuring 22–32 by 0.7 μm; and in containing 4,5-dichlorolichexanthone instead of thiophanic acid.

== Chemistry ==
The thallus surface of Amandinea pilbarensis is UV−, and the thallus medulla does not react to potassium hydroxide (K−). The pseudostroma surface is UV+ (pink to orange), and pigmented parts of pseudostroma react K+ (blood red). Thin-layer chromatography analysis reveals the presence of an anthraquinone, likely parietin.

== Habitat and distribution ==
At the time of its original publication, Amandinea pilbarensis was known only from the type collection in Australia. Associated lichen species include Australiaena streimannii, Buellia kimberleyana, and Caloplaca leptozona.
