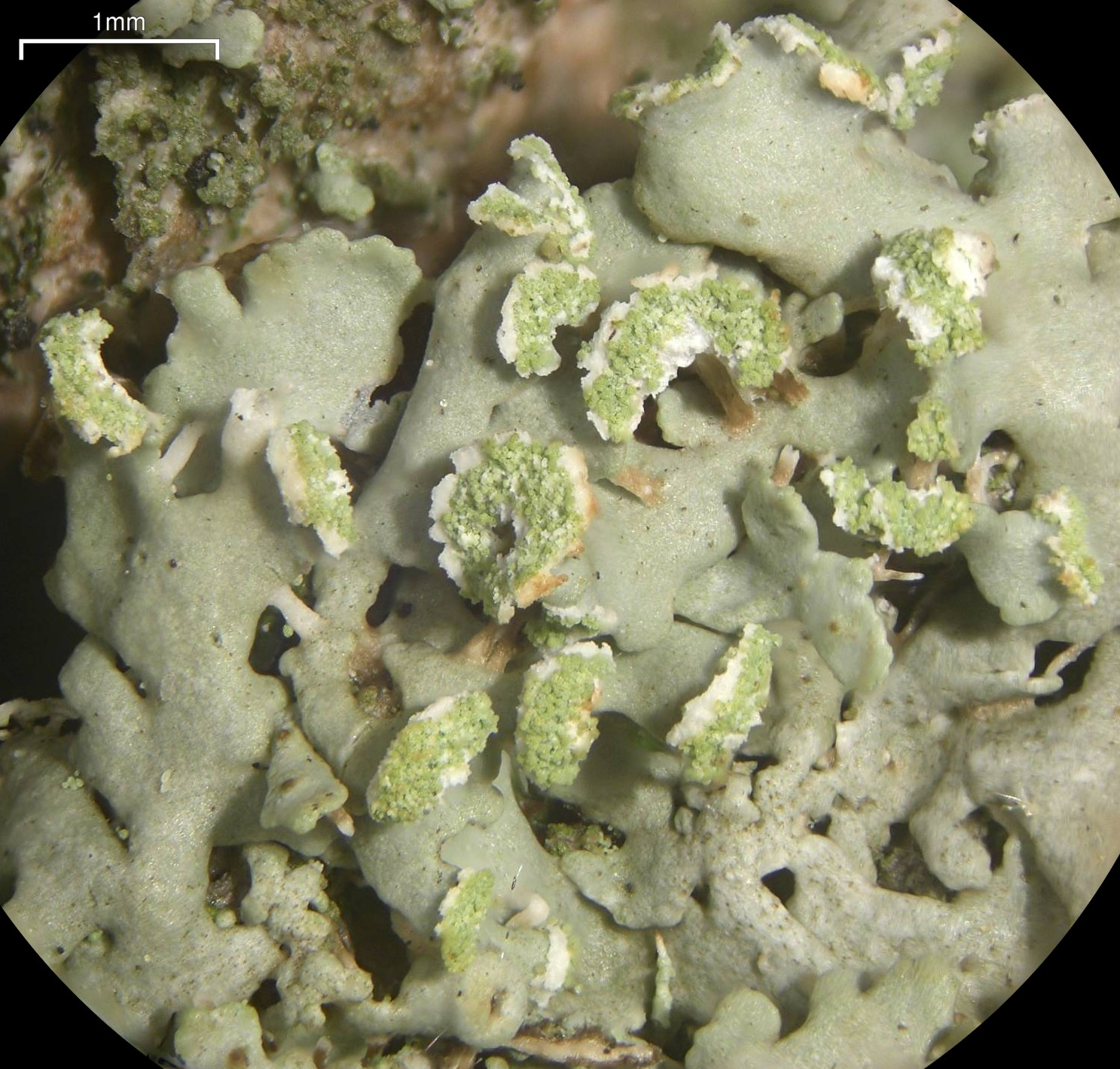
- Closeup of thallus surface; scale bar = 1 mm

Conservation status
- Secure (NatureServe)

Scientific classification
- Kingdom: Fungi
- Division: Ascomycota
- Class: Lecanoromycetes
- Order: Caliciales
- Family: Physciaceae
- Genus: Physciella
- Species: P. chloantha

Binomial name
- Physciella chloantha (Ach.) Essl. (1986)

Synonyms
- List: Parmelia chloantha Ach. (1814); Parmelia obscura var. chloantha (Ach.) Schaer. (1840); Parmelia obscura f. chloantha (Ach.) Flot. (1850); Anaptychia obscura var. chloantha (Ach.) A.Massal. (1853); Squamaria obscura var. chloantha (Ach.) Beltr. (1858); Lobaria obscura var. chloantha (Ach.) Hepp (1860); Borrera obscura ß chloantha (Ach.) Mudd (1861); Dimelaena obscura var. chloantha (Ach.) Trevis. (1868); Physcia obscura f. chloantha (Ach.) Stein (1879); Physcia chloantha (Ach.) Vain. ex van der Byl (1931); Physcia orbicularis var. chloantha (Ach.) Sántha (1928); Physcia ciliata f. chloantha (Ach.) Nádv. (1947); Physcia ciliaris f. chloantha (Ach.) Nádv. (1948); Phaeophyscia chloantha (Ach.) Moberg (1978)

= Physciella chloantha =

Species of lichen

Physciella chloantha is a species of foliose lichen in the family Physciaceae. The lichen, which occurs in diverse regions including the Upper Midwest of the US, Europe, Japan, Pakistan, and European Russia, is common in certain areas. Its thallus forms circular patches up to 3 cm in diameter, made up of many small, discrete lobes that can grow together to cover large areas, often intermingling with other lichen species. These lobes, which vary from short and rounded to slightly elongated, have numerous soralia (reproductive structures) on their edges and surfaces, while the undersides are white to pale tan with sparse rhizines. Apothecia (fruiting bodies) are uncommon in this species. Physciella chloantha is known to grow on bark and on rocks.

== Taxonomy ==
It was first formally described as a new species in 1814 by the Swedish lichenologist Erik Acharius, as Parmelia chloantha. The taxon has more than a dozen synonyms that it has acquired in its taxonomic history through being shuffled to various genera, or by authors who thought it should be considered a variety or form of another species. Ted Esslinger transferred it to Physciella in 1986 when he circumscribed the new genus to contain a group of species similar to what was then known as Physcia orbicularis.

== Description ==
Physciella chloantha typically forms rounded units up to about 3 cm (1.2 in) in diameter, comprising numerous, discrete ascending lobes. These lobes, which measure 0.5–1.5 mm across, can coalesce to cover large areas, often blending with other species. They range from short and rounded to somewhat elongate and frequently ascend at the tip, especially when sorediate. The thallus is characterised by numerous marginal and terminal, labriform (lip-shaped) soralia, and sometimes scattered laminal soralia that develop over time. The lower surface of the lichen is white to pale tan, featuring sparse, similarly coloured rhizines. The placement of these rhizines varies considerably across specimens. Apothecia (fruiting bodies) are rare in this species, measuring up to 1 mm in diameter, and may be sessile or very shortly stipitate with an entire or irregularly crenate (scalloped) margin. The spores are typical of the Physcia-type, measuring 17–22.5 by 8–11 μm, with lumina that often become rounded with age. Conidia are ellipsoid, measuring 2.5–3.5 by 1 μm.

Physciella chloantha is often confused with its close relative, Physciella melanchra, which primarily differs in having mainly laminal soralia and being somewhat larger on average. Specimens of Physciella chloantha with well-developed laminal soralia must be carefully distinguished from Physciella melanchra, particularly as they sometimes coexist in the same habitats.

== Habitat and distribution ==
Physciella chloantha, once overlooked in North America, is quite common in some parts of its range. It was previously mapped under the synonym Physcia luganensis in North America. This species has also been reported in southern and south-central Europe, as well as Japan. It predominantly inhabits bark but is also found on rock surfaces. The lichen's distribution includes diverse regions, from the Upper Midwest of the US to parts of Europe and Japan, Pakistan, and European Russia.
