= Helmutiopsis =

Scientific classification
- Domain: Eukaryota
- Kingdom: Fungi
- Division: Ascomycota
- Class: Lecanoromycetes
- Order: Caliciales
- Family: Physciaceae
- Genus: Helmutiopsis; S.Y.Kondr., Lőkös & Hur (2021)

Type species
- Helmutiopsis atrocinerea (Fr.) S.Y.Kondr., Lőkös & Hur (2021)

Species
- H. alba H. aspersa H. atrocinerea

Genus of lichens

Helmutiopsis is a small genus of lichen-forming fungi in the family Physciaceae. It comprises three species of saxicolous (rock-dwelling), crustose lichens found in the Northern Hemisphere. They have a thin, grey to whitish-grey thallus divided into areoles and with numerous lecanorine fruiting bodies (apothecia). Chemically, Helmutiopsis lichens contain atranorin, gyrophoric acid, and lecanoric acid.

The genus was circumscribed in 2021 by the lichenologists Sergey Kondratyuk, László Lőkös, and Jae-Seoun Hur, who assigned H. atrocinerea as the type species. The genus name honours the Austrian lichenologist Helmut Mayrhofer, "in recognition of his extensive contribution to the knowledge of rinodinoid lichens and to lichenology in general".

Helmutiopsis contains a branch of a subclade of fungi identified in molecular phylogenetics analysis as being genetically distant from Rinodina (in the strict sense). It is morphologically similar to Rinodina, except for having Pachysporaria-type of ascospores (with thickened spore walls), and its different secondary chemistry. Kondratyuk and colleagues' division of Rinodina into smaller segregate genera has not been accepted by all authors.

== Species ==
- Helmutiopsis alba (Metzler ex Arnold) S.Y.Kondr., Lőkös & Hur (2021)
- Helmutiopsis aspersa (Borrer) S.Y.Kondr., Lőkös & Hur (2021)
- Helmutiopsis atrocinerea (Fr.) S.Y.Kondr., Lőkös & Hur (2021)
