= Klauskalbia =

Scientific classification
- Domain: Eukaryota
- Kingdom: Fungi
- Division: Ascomycota
- Class: Lecanoromycetes
- Order: Caliciales
- Family: Physciaceae
- Genus: Klauskalbia; S.Y.Kondr., Lőkös, E.Farkas & Hur (2021)

Type species
- Klauskalbia obscurata (Nyl.) S.Y.Kondr., Lőkös, E.Farkas & Hur (2021)

Species
- K. crocea K. flabellata K. obscurata K. paradoxa

Genus of lichens

Klauskalbia is a genus of lichen-forming fungi in the family Physciaceae. It has four species of foliose lichens.

== Taxonomy ==
The genus was circumscribed in 2021 by lichenologists Sergey Kondratyuk, László Lőkös, Edit Farkas, and Jae-Seoun Hur. Klauskalbia obscurata was assigned as the type species; this species was originally described as Physcia speciosa subsp. obscurata by William Nylander in 1863. The genus name honours German lichenologist Klaus Kalb.

Klauskalbia bears resemblance to the genus Heterodermia in the strict sense, but is differentiated primarily by the absence of a lower cortex. Its lower surface typically appears dull and is devoid of rhizines. Unlike Heterodermia, which usually features a shiny lower cortex or pseudocortex often equipped with rhizines, Klauskalbia is marked by a cottony layer of hyphae on the lower surface, saturated with yellow to orange-brown pigments. Additionally, the genus Klauskalbia has some likeness to Polyblastidium due to the marginal rhizines in its thallus that soon take on a deep black colour. However, the distinction lies in the lower surface structure of Polyblastidium, which comprises more sporadic hyphae either devoid of pigments or sporadically pigmented.

== Description ==
The thallus of Klauskalbia is foliose in nature, with shapes ranging from orbicular to irregularly spreading and has a moderately to loosely adnate attachment. Its lobes, which can be plane to convex, have a characteristic sublinear-elongate shape with irregular branching. These lobes often radiate, with their tips neither ascending nor covered in cilia. The upper surface of this lichen tends to vary between grey-white to greenish-white tones, which may darken towards the centre. Klauskalbia lacks soredia, isidia, and pruina or may present sorediate traits, with soredia that are either farinose or granular in form. The medulla is white, contrasting with a lower medulla that showcases shades of dark yellow to orange-brown. Notably, the lower surface of this lichen lacks a cortex, and is instead overlaid with a cotton-woolly layer of hyphae that is steeped in yellow to orange-brown pigments. In certain species, the texture is arachnoid, and it is not uncommon for black marginal rhizines to be present, either in a simple (unbranched) form or exhibiting squarrosely branched patterns. The apothecia of Klauskalbia are either rare or common, situated on the laminal surface and can be sessile to nearly stipitate in form. The chemistry of Klauskalbia is also worth noting; the cortex reacts K+ (yellow), and the genus contains specific substances like atranorin and zeorin.

== Habitat and distribution ==
Endowed with an ecological range that spans various forest types and altitudes from 630 to 2,565 m (2,067 to 8,415 ft) a.s.l., Klauskalbia is found on tree barks, dead wood, and rocks in varied environments, from savannas and tropical rainforests to mountainous scrubland and coniferous forests. Thus far, four species have been categorised under this genus. The species Klauskalbia flabellata has a widespread distribution, including regions like Australia, parts of America, Africa, Asia, and even Fiji, making it potentially the most prevalent of the four. Conversely, Klauskalbia obscurata is frequently found across continents like North, Central and South America, Africa, Asia, Australia, possibly Europe, and New Zealand. However, K. paradoxa and K. crocea have a more restricted distribution, being native exclusively to Indonesia and North America, respectively.

== Species ==
- Klauskalbia crocea (R.C.Harris) S.Y.Kondr., Lőkös, E.Farkas & Hur (2021)
- Klauskalbia flabellata (Fée) S.Y.Kondr., Lőkös, E.Farkas & Hur (2021)
- Klauskalbia obscurata (Nyl.) S.Y.Kondr., Lőkös, E.Farkas & Hur (2021)
- Klauskalbia paradoxa (Schumm & Schäf.-Verw.) S.Y.Kondr., Lőkös, E.Farkas & Hur (2021)
