= Awasthia =

Scientific classification
- Kingdom: Fungi
- Division: Ascomycota
- Class: Lecanoromycetes
- Order: Caliciales
- Family: Physciaceae
- Genus: Awasthia; Essl. (1978)
- Species: A. melanotricha

Binomial name
- Awasthia melanotricha (D.D.Awasthi) Essl. (1978)

Synonyms
- Physcia melanotricha D.D.Awasthi (1957)

Single-species lichen genus

Awasthia is a monotypic fungal genus in the family Physciaceae. It contains the single species Awasthia melanotricha, a foliose lichen found in the Nepal Himalayas. It is a dark greyish-brown, leafy lichen that forms small, nearly circular patches on moist sandy soil above the tree line, at elevations above 4,300 m. The genus was established in 1978 by Ted Esslinger and is named in honour of Dharani Dhar Awasthi, the Indian lichenologist who first described the species.

== Taxonomy ==
This lichen was first formally described by the Indian lichenologist Dharani Dhar Awasthi in 1957. He gathered the type specimen from above the banks of the Saju Pokhari near Topke Gola, at an elevation ranging from 4,520 and 4,575 metres (14,829 and 15,010 ft), thriving on moist sandy soil alongside mosses and grasses. Awasthi chose the species epithet melanotricha following a suggestion from Adolf Hugo Magnusson. Ted Esslinger later circumscribed Awasthia in 1978 to contain the species, characterised by its unusually branched rhizines and the presence of the substances gyrophoric and lecanoric acids. The genus names honours Awasthi, "well known Indian lichenologist, a student of the Physciaceae, and the collector of the type material". Esslinger noted that due to the lack of apothecia and spores, the placement of the genus in the Physciaceae was to be considered tentative.

== Description ==
Awasthia melanotricha is a foliose lichen, meaning its body (thallus) is leaf-like and loosely attaches to its substrate. It forms nearly circular patches, typically measuring 4–5 cm (1.6–2.0 in) across, with lobes that rise slightly from the surface. These lobes are intricately branched in a pattern that resembles repeated forks (subdichotomously branched) and are often layered over each other (imbricated). Each lobe is typically 1.5–2 mm wide, narrowing to about 1 mm at the tips, and has a gently channeled (canaliculate) surface extending to its ends, giving them a concave appearance on the upper side. The edges of the lobes are generally smooth but may be slightly uneven.

When moist, the thallus is leathery and flexible but becomes brittle when dry. In preserved (herbarium) specimens, the lobes may twist around to reveal the underside. The upper surface of the thallus is smooth, dark greyish-brown to brownish-black, often lighter at the tips. The underside is black, densely covered with short, black, branched, and rough-surfaced hair-like outgrowths (rhizines]) that are about 1 mm long and 0.1 mm thick at the base. The lichen does not produce soredia or isidia, which are structures used by some lichens for reproduction.

The thallus structure includes a top layer (upper cortex) made of tightly packed, roundish to slightly angular cells, creating a protective covering about 16–20 μm thick. Below this, there is a layer of green algal cells (genus Protococcus), each up to 10 μm in size, forming an algal layer about 20–25 μm thick that aids in photosynthesis. The central layer (medulla) consists of tightly packed, longitudinally aligned fungal filaments (hyphae), appearing compact in cross-section and sometimes resembling the upper cortex due to their density. These hyphae are about 4 μm thick with thick walls. Below the cortex, the structure becomes more loosely packed (plectenchymatous) and darker. Chemical spot tests on the upper cortex and medulla show no reaction, indicating the absence of certain lichen products often used for identification. Awasthia melanotricha is sterile, meaning it does not produce reproductive structures (apothecia) typical of many lichens.

== Habitat and dfistribution ==
In Nepal, Awasthia melanotricha has been reported from 4,350 to 4,510 m elevation in a compilation of published records, and it was treated as endemic to Nepal. This reported range lies above the tree line.
