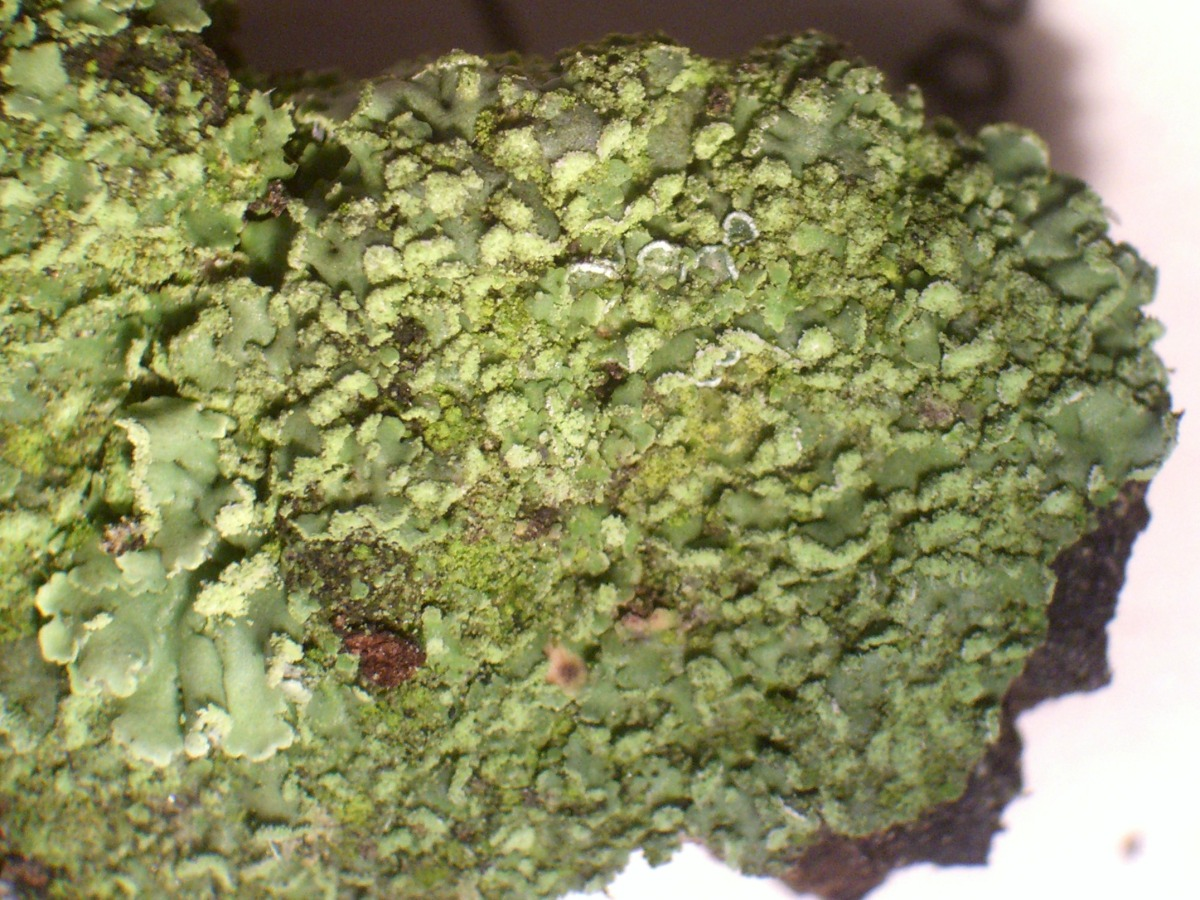
- Physciella chloantha

Scientific classification
- Kingdom: Fungi
- Division: Ascomycota
- Class: Lecanoromycetes
- Order: Caliciales
- Family: Physciaceae
- Genus: Physciella; Essl. (1986)

Type species
- Physciella chloantha (Ach.) Essl. (1986)

= Physciella =

Genus of lichens

Physciella is a genus of lichen-forming fungi in the family Physciaceae. Circumscribed by the lichenologist Ted Esslinger in 1986, it is distinguished from the similar genera Physcia and Phaeophyscia by its prosoplectenchymatous (comprising long, narrow, wavy, parallel hyphae) lower cortex, the lack of the secondary metabolite (lichen product) atranorin in the upper cortex, and short, ellipsoid-shaped conidia.

== Description ==
Physciella forms a small to medium-sized, leaf-like (foliose) thallus that lies close to its substrate. The upper surface ranges from almost white to grey or grey-brown, while the underside is white to pale tan and bears only sparse, pale root-like holdfasts called rhizines. Individual lobes are elongated to rounded and seldom wider than 1–2 mm. In cross-section, the outer skin (upper cortex) is built of tightly packed cells, beneath which a loose mesh of fungal threads (the medulla) allows gas exchange and water storage; the lower cortex is more densely intertwined, giving the thallus strength and protecting the rhizines.

Sexual fruit-bodies (apothecia) have not been recorded in British collections, but elsewhere they are disc-shaped structures with their own cortex derived from the thallus (lecanorine margin). They sit on the upper surface (laminal) and are either stalkless (sessile) or borne on a very short stalk. The interior spore layer (hymenium) is clear, and the tissue beneath it (hypothecium) is colourless to pale brown. Each sac (ascus) holds eight ascospores that mature to a greyish-brown or brown hue. These spores are divided once by a cross-wall (1-septate) and vary in outline from the typical Physcia form—slender with tapering ends—to the more rounded Pachysporaria type. Asexual reproduction occurs in tiny, immersed flask-shaped structures (pycnidia) that generate ellipsoidal, single-celled conidia.

Chemical analyses using thin-layer chromatography have so far failed to detect any secondary metabolites, so identification rests on the combination of a sparsely rhizinate pale underside, narrow lobes, the absence of detectable lichen products, and spore characters. These features help separate Physciella from the superficially similar and far more common genus Physcia in temperate regions.

== Species ==
As of June 2025, Species Fungorum (in the Catalogue of Life) accepts eight species of Physciella:

- Physciella austrosibirica G.Urban. (2007)
- Physciella chloantha (Ach.) Essl. (1986)
- Physciella denigrata (Hue) Essl. (1986)
- Physciella melanchra (Hue) Essl. (1986)
- Physciella neotropica M.F.Souza & Aptroot (2020) – Brazil
- Physciella nepalensis (Poelt) Essl. (1986)
- Physciella nigricans (Flörke) S.Y.Kondr., Lőkös & Hur (2021)
- Physciella poeltii (Frey) D.Liu & J.S.Hur (2020)
