= Rinodinella =

Scientific classification
- Domain: Eukaryota
- Kingdom: Fungi
- Division: Ascomycota
- Class: Lecanoromycetes
- Order: Caliciales
- Family: Physciaceae
- Genus: Rinodinella; H.Mayrhofer & Poelt (1978)

Type species
- Rinodinella controversa (A.Massal.) H.Mayrhofer & Poelt (1978)

Genus of lichen

Rinodinella is a genus of lichen-forming fungi in the family Physciaceae.
