= Phaeorrhiza =

Scientific classification
- Domain: Eukaryota
- Kingdom: Fungi
- Division: Ascomycota
- Class: Lecanoromycetes
- Order: Caliciales
- Family: Physciaceae
- Genus: Phaeorrhiza; H.Mayrhofer & Poelt (1979)

Type species
- Phaeorrhiza nimbosa (Fr.) H.Mayrhofer & Poelt (1979)

Genus of lichens

Phaeorrhiza is a genus of lichen-forming fungi in the family Physciaceae.
