= Tornabea =

Scientific classification
- Domain: Eukaryota
- Kingdom: Fungi
- Division: Ascomycota
- Class: Lecanoromycetes
- Order: Caliciales
- Family: Physciaceae
- Genus: Tornabea; Oesth. (1980)

Type species
- Tornabea scutellifera (With.) J.R. Laundon (1984)

Synonyms
- Lichen scutelliferus With., Lichen intricatus Desf.; Parmelia atlantica Ach.; Cornicularia intricata DC.; Lichen atlanticus (Ach.) Sm.; Borrera atlantica (Ach.) Ach.; Tornabenia atlantica (Ach.) Kurok.; Tornabeniopsis atlantica (Ach.) Follmann; Tornabea atlantica (Ach.) Østh.; Evernia intricata (DC.) Fr.; Hagenia intricata (DC.) De Not.; Physcia intricata (DC.) Schaer.; Anaptychia intricata (DC.) A. Massal.; Tornabenia intricata (DC.) Trevis.; Borrera intricata (DC.) Mudd; Teloschistes intricatus (DC.) Hue; Xanthoria intricata (DC.) Horw.; Tornabea atlantica var. intricata (DC.) Clauzade & Cl. Roux,

Genus of lichens

Tornabea is a monotypic genus of lichenized fungi in the family Physciaceae. It only contains the one accepted species, Tornabea scutellifera (With.) J.R. Laundon (1984)

2 other species has been found to be synonyms of Tornabea scutellifera; Tornabea atlantica (Ach.) Østh. (1980) and Tornabea atlantica var. intricata (DC.) Clauzade & Cl. Roux (1985)

The genus was circumscribed by Haavard Østhagen in Taxon vol.29 on pages 687-688 in 1980.

The genus name of Tornabea is in honour of Francesco Tornabene (1813–1897), who was an Italian Benedictine Monk and botanist. At Montecassino Abbey, he was Professor of Botany, as well as founder and Director of the Botanical Garden in Catania between 1847 - 1892.
