= Coscinocladium =

Scientific classification
- Domain: Eukaryota
- Kingdom: Fungi
- Division: Ascomycota
- Class: Lecanoromycetes
- Order: Caliciales
- Family: Physciaceae
- Genus: Coscinocladium; Kunze (1846)

Type species
- Coscinocladium occidentale Kunze (1846)

Species
- C. gaditanum C. occidentale

Genus of fungi

Coscinocladium is a genus of two species of lichenized fungi in the family Physciaceae.

== Species ==
- Coscinocladium gaditanum (Clemente) A.Crespo, Llimona & D.Hawksw. (2004)
- Coscinocladium occidentale Kunze (1846)
