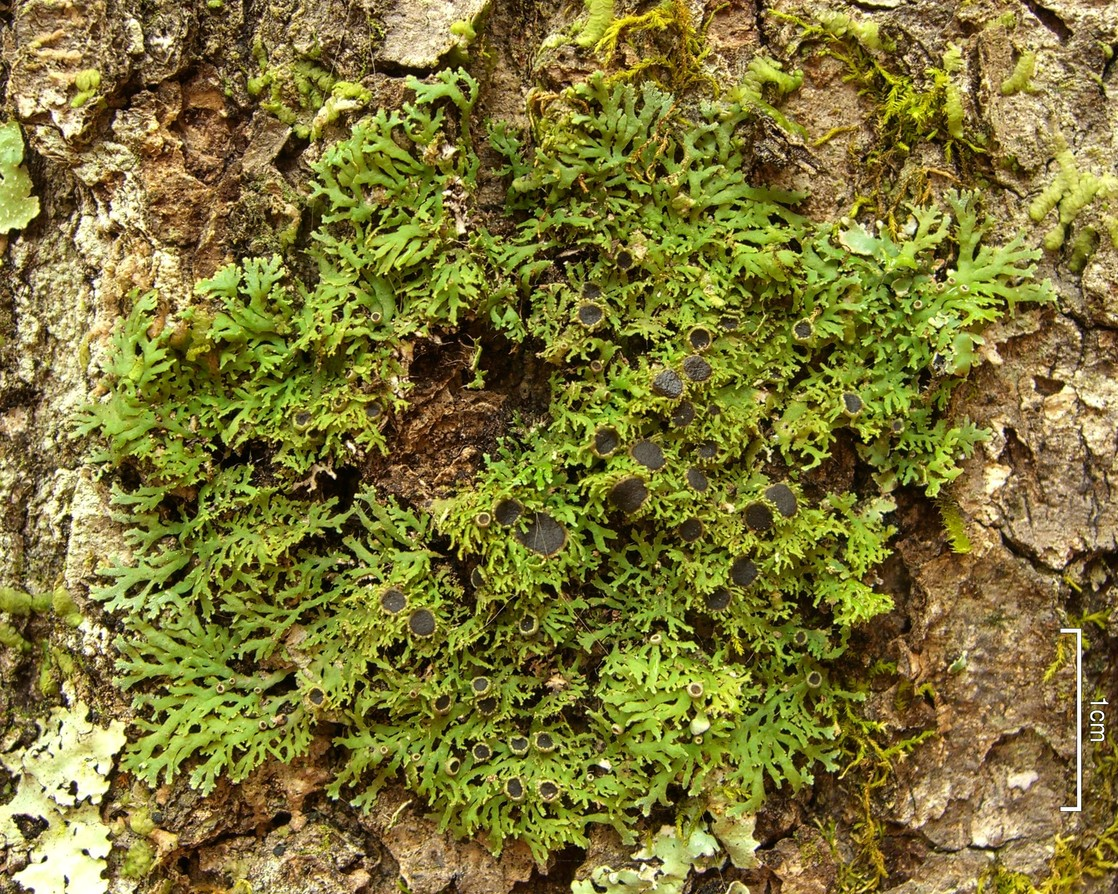
- Kurokawia palmulata

Scientific classification
- Domain: Eukaryota
- Kingdom: Fungi
- Division: Ascomycota
- Class: Lecanoromycetes
- Order: Caliciales
- Family: Physciaceae
- Genus: Kurokawia; S.Y.Kondr., Lőkös & Hur (2021)

Type species
- Kurokawia isidiata (Tomin) S.Y.Kondr., Lőkös & Hur (2021)

Species
- K. bryorum K. isidiata K. mereschkowskii K. palmulata K. pseudoroemeri K. runcinata K. stippaea

= Kurokawia =

Genus of lichens

Kurokawia is a genus of lichen-forming fungi in the family Physciaceae. It has seven species of foliose lichens. The genus, circumscribed in 2021, has Kurokawia isidiata as the type species.

== Taxonomy ==
The lichen genus Kurokawia was named in honour of Japanese lichenologist Syo Kurokawa (1926–2010), who authored a world monograph on the genus Anaptychia. The genus is distinct from Anaptychia, despite certain resemblances, primarily in its prosoplectenchymatous upper cortical layer. The type species of Kurokawia is Kurokawia isidiata. A total of six species were initially acknowledged members of the genus based on combined phylogenetic analyses. An additional species was transferred to Kurokawia from Anaptychia in 2022.

== Description ==
Kurokawia is discernible by its foliose (leafy) thallus which is closely affixed to the substrate. When dry, the upper surface has hues ranging from light to dark brown but transitions to a dull olive green when moist. In contrast, the genus Anaptychia has typically lacked a well-formed lower cortex or possesses a poorly developed one. Characteristically, Kurokawia has simple, sparsely branched rhizines and shorter ascospores. In addition, it does not have the pale grey-white lateral cilia or tomentum observed on the upper surface of some Anaptychia species. The distinction between Kurokawia and the two groups within Anaptychia – the Anaptychia ciliaris group and the section Protoanaptychia – hinges on aspects like thallus type, the presence of a lower cortical layer, and unique morphological features.

== Habitat and distribution ==
Endemic to various global regions, Kurokawia thrives on hard coastal rocks, on turf, soil, and occasionally on tree bark, especially along pathways. The species Kurokawia isidiata is notably present in East Asia and extends to North America, specifically in Alaska. In the Mediterranean region, K. runcinata has been identified, while both K. bryorum and K. palmulata are sparsely found in the Northern Hemisphere.

== Species ==
As of September 2023, Species Fungorum (in the Catalogue of Life) accepts seven species of Kurokawia.

- Kurokawia bryorum (Poelt) S.Y.Kondr., Lőkös & Hur (2021)
- Kurokawia isidiata (Tomin) S.Y.Kondr., Lőkös & Hur (2021)
- Kurokawia mereschkowskii (Tomin) S.Y.Kondr., Lőkös & Hur (2021)
- Kurokawia palmulata (Michx.) S.Y.Kondr., Lőkös & Hur (2021)
- Kurokawia pseudoroemeri (D.D.Awasthi & S.R.Singh) Hollinger, Noell & S.D.Leav. (2022)
- Kurokawia runcinata (With.) S.Y.Kondr., Lőkös & Hur (2021)
- Kurokawia stippaea (Ach.) S.Y.Kondr., Lőkös & Hur (2021)
