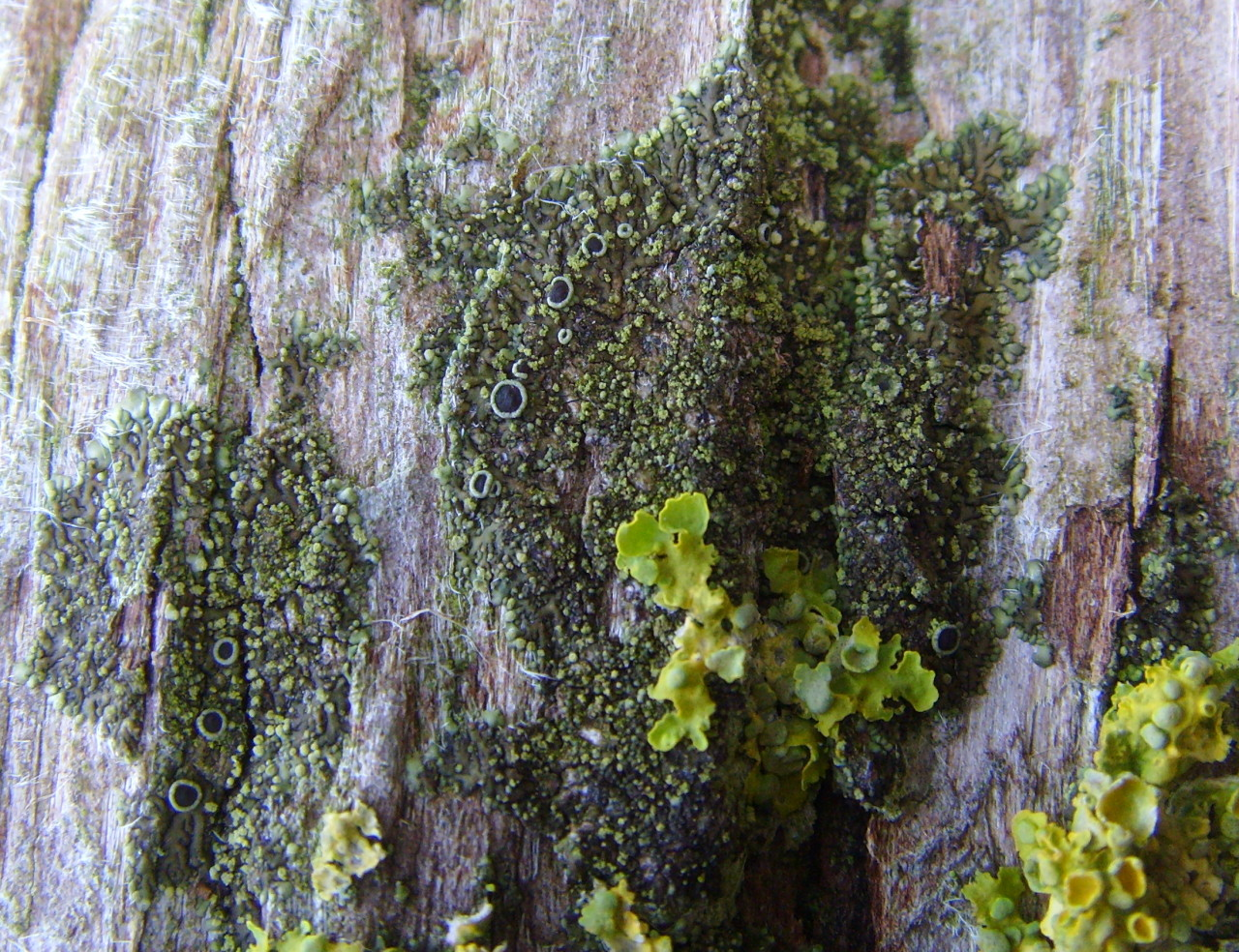
- Hyperphyscia adglutinata

Scientific classification
- Domain: Eukaryota
- Kingdom: Fungi
- Division: Ascomycota
- Class: Lecanoromycetes
- Order: Caliciales
- Family: Physciaceae
- Genus: Hyperphyscia; Müll.Arg. (1894)

Type species
- Hyperphyscia synthalea (C.Knight) Müll.Arg. (1894)

= Hyperphyscia =

Genus of lichen-forming fungi

Hyperphyscia is a genus of lichen-forming fungi in the family Physciaceae. These lichens form tightly attached, leaf-like crusts that spread outward in rosettes, with individual lobes radiating in shallow, overlapping tiers that are seldom more than a millimetre or two wide and range in colour from pale brownish-grey to dark brown. They reproduce through brown, disc-shaped fruiting bodies that sit directly on the upper surface and contain thick-walled brown ascospores divided by a single cross-wall, typical of many members of their family.

== Taxonomy ==
The genus was circumscribed by the Swiss lichenologist Johannes Müller Argoviensis in 1894. He assigned Hyperphyscia synthalea as the type species.

== Description ==
Hyperphyscia forms a tightly attached, leaf-like crust that spreads outward in a rosette. Viewed from above, the individual lobes radiate in shallow, overlapping tiers and are seldom more than a millimetre or two wide. Their surface is dull and free of any frost-like bloom (pruina), ranging in colour from pale brownish-grey to dark brown. The lower surface is much paler and bears only a scattering of very short, almost hidden rhizines that anchor the thallus to bark or stone. Internally, the upper cortex is built of roughly cube-shaped cells with cavities three to seven micrometres across, while the lower cortex is restricted to the lobe tips; there it consists of tightly woven brown hyphae whose minute cells merge into the substrate. Some species develop granular soralia—tiny eruptions that release powdery propagules for vegetative dispersal. The photosynthetic partner photobiont) is a green alga of the Trebouxia type.

Sexual reproduction takes place in disc-shaped apothecia (fruiting bodies) that sit directly on the upper surface. Each disc is brown, matt and lacks any whitish dusting, while its rim is made from the same fungal–algal tissue as the rest of the thallus (a thalline margin). A pale-brown epithecium covers the colourless hymenium beneath; this spore layer turns blue in iodine, a reaction lichenologists use for identification. The hymenium is threaded with slender paraphyses that branch near the top and end in club-shaped tips capped by a thin, dark-brown pigment. The asci are narrow, eight-spored and conform to the Lecanora type; their spores mature to a single-septate, thick-walled brown form typical of many members of the family Physciaceae. Asexual spores are produced in immersed pycnidia whose otherwise colourless walls are ringed by a brown zone at the pore; they release thread-like conidia formed on short, barrel-shaped cells. Chemical tests have yet to detect lichen acids in the genus, although some species contain traces of the orange pigment skyrin, visible only under the microscope or by chromatography.

== Species ==
As of June 2025, Species Fungorum (in the Catalogue of Life) accept eight species of Hyperphyscia, although several more than this have been described in the genus.

- Hyperphyscia adglutinata (Flörke) H.Mayrhofer & Poelt (1979)
- Hyperphyscia carassensis (Vain.) Osorio (1985)
- Hyperphyscia cochlearis Scutari (1997)
- Hyperphyscia confusa Essl., C.A.Morse & S.D.Leav. (2012)
- Hyperphyscia coralloidea (Lynge) Scutari (1991)
- Hyperphyscia coronata Scutari (1997)
- Hyperphyscia crocata Kashiw. (1985)
- Hyperphyscia endochrysea (Nyl.) Filippini, Quiroga, J.M.Rodr. & Estrabou (2015)
- Hyperphyscia granulata (Poelt) Moberg (1987)
- Hyperphyscia lucida van der Pluijm (2020)
- Hyperphyscia minor (Fée) Kalb (1988)
- Hyperphyscia mobergii Kalb (1990)
- Hyperphyscia oxneri S.Y.Kondr. & Hur (2018)
- Hyperphyscia pandani (H.Magn.) Moberg (1987)
- Hyperphyscia plinthiza (Nyl.) Müll.Arg. (1894)
- Hyperphyscia pruinosa Moberg (1987)
- Hyperphyscia pseudocoralloides Scutari (1997)
- Hyperphyscia syncolla (Tuck. ex Nyl.) Kalb (1983)
- Hyperphyscia synthalea (C.Knight) Müll.Arg. (1894)
- Hyperphyscia variabilis Scutari (1991)
- Hyperphyscia viridissima (Müll.Arg.) Scutari (1991)
