= Helmut Mayrhofer =

Austrian lichenologist

- Born: 1953 (age 72–73); Aich, Austria
- Education: University of Graz
- Scientific career
- Fields: Lichenology
- Workplaces: University of Graz
- Author abbrev. (botany): H.Mayrhofer

Helmut Mayrhofer is an Austrian lichenologist. He is known for his expertise on the lichen family Physciaceae and his studies of the lichen flora of the Balkan Peninsula, the Alps, and other regions.

== Biography ==
Helmut Mayrhofer was born in 1953 in Aich, a village in Austria. He went to secondary school in Gröbming and Graz, and then to the University of Graz. He graduated from there in 1976 with a master's degree, having submitted a thesis titled "Flechten auf Rhododendron ferrugineum" ("Lichens on Rhododendron ferrugineum"). Mayrhofer worked at the Stiftsgymnasium Admont as a high school teacher before returning to the University of Graz for work as a scientific assistant, a position he held until 1988. While working as a schoolteacher, Mayrhofer was also working on his doctoral degree, under the supervision of Josef Poelt. He defended his thesis, titled "Die saxicolen Arten der Flechtengattungen Rinodina und Rinodinella in der Alten Welt" ("The saxicolous species of the lichen genera Rinodina and Rinodinella in the Old World) in 1988, receiving his venia docendi (Doctor of Science) in plant systematics. That year he became a university lecturer; eventually he became an associate professor in 1995, and held this position until he retired in 2018. As of that year, he had supervised 10 PhD students and 38 masters and diploma thesis candidates.

Mayrhofer served twice (1999–2010 and 2013–2017) as the head of the Institute of Plant Sciences at the University of Graz. He was a visiting scholar at the University of Ljubljana in Slovenia from 2001 to 2003 and at the University of Montenegro in Podgorica from 2004 to 2006. He served as a member of the editorial boards of the journals Acta Botanica Croatica, Mycobiota, and Natura Montenegrina, and has been an editor of the journal Herzogia.

== Research ==
Mayrhofer started research on crustose lichens beginning with his master's thesis. Through comparative light microscopical studies of lichens in Rinodina, he developed a typology of ascospores that proved to be useful in the identification of species in that genus, and later in the taxonomy of the entire family. As a result of his research, Rinodina went from being one of the least understood crustose lichen genera in the 1980s to one of the most studied. He later included other characters such as secondary chemistry, ascus shapes, ascospore ontogeny, and molecular phylogenetics to help resolve taxonomic issues in the Physciaceae.

Another research interest of Mayrhofer has been documenting lichen biodiversity in various locations. Together with his students, and sometimes in collaboration with other colleagues, he has catalogued the lichen biota of several countries in the Balkan Peninsula, the Mediterranean islands of Cyprus and Crete, as well as the Asian countries of Armenia and Tajikistan. Mayrhofer has explored extensively several mountainous areas in Austria and Slovenia and has compiled an annotated inventory of lichens in the Alps.

== Eponymy ==
Several lichen species have been named in Mayrhofer's honour, including:

Fuscidea mayrhoferi Kantvilas (2004); Lecanora mayrhoferi Lumbsch (1994); Rinodina mayrhoferi A.Crespo (1984); Skyttea mayrhoferi Diederich & Etayo (2000); Unguiculariopsis helmutii S.Y.Kondr., Lőkös & Hur (2016); Xanthoparmelia mayrhoferi Elix (1997); Acarospora mayrhoferi K.Knudsen & Kocourk. (2018); Cratiria mayrhoferi Elix (2018); Dimelaena mayrhoferiana Aptroot & M.Cáceres (2018); Lecanora helmutii Pérez-Ortega & Kantvilas (2018); Stigmidium mayrhoferi Er.Zimm. & F.Berger (2018) Tremella mayrhoferi J.C.Zamora, Millanes, Etayo & Wedin (2018); and Usnea mayrhoferi Herrera-Camp., Bungartz, Truong & P.Clerc (2018).

== Selected publications ==
A compilation of Mayrhofer's scientific publications up until 2018 was given in the Bilovitz et al. tribute article. Some of his major works include:

- Mayrhofer, H.; Poelt, J. (1979). "Die saxicolen Arten der Flechtengattung Rinodina in Europa" [The saxicolous species of lichen genus Rinodina in Europe]. Bibliotheca Lichenologica (in German). 12: 1–186.
- Mayrhofer, H. (1984). "Die saxicolen Arten der Flechtengattungen Rinodina und Rinodinella in der Alten Welt" [The saxicolous species of the genera Rinodina and Rinodinella in the Old World]. Journal of the Hattori Botanical Laboratory (in German). 55: 327–493.
- Mayrhofer, H. (1987). "Monographie der Flechtengattung Thelenella" [Monograph of the lichen genus Thelenella]. Bibliotheca Lichenologica (in German). 26: 1–106.
- Suppan, Ursula; Prügger, Johannes; Mayrhofer, Helmut (2000). Catalogue of the lichenized and lichenicolous fungi of Slovenia. Bibliotheca Lichenologica. Vol. 76. pp. 1–215. ISBN 978-3-443-58055-1.
- Hafellner, J.; Petutschnig, W.; Taurer-Zeiner, C.; Mayrhofer, H. (2005). "Zur Flechtendiversität in den Gurktaler Alpen (Österreich: Kärnten, Steiermark und Salzburg)" [On lichen diversity in the Gurktal Alps (Austria: Kärnten, Steiermark und Salzburg)]. Herzogia (in German). 18: 79–138.
- Nimis, Pier Luigi; Hafellner, Josef; Roux, Claude; Clerc, Philippe; Mayrhofer, Helmut; Martellos, Stefano; Bilovitz, Peter O. (2018). "The lichens of the Alps – an annotated checklist". MycoKeys (31): 1–634. doi:10.3897/mycokeys.31.23568. PMC 5914158. PMID 29706791.

== See also ==
- Category:Taxa named by Helmut Mayrhofer
