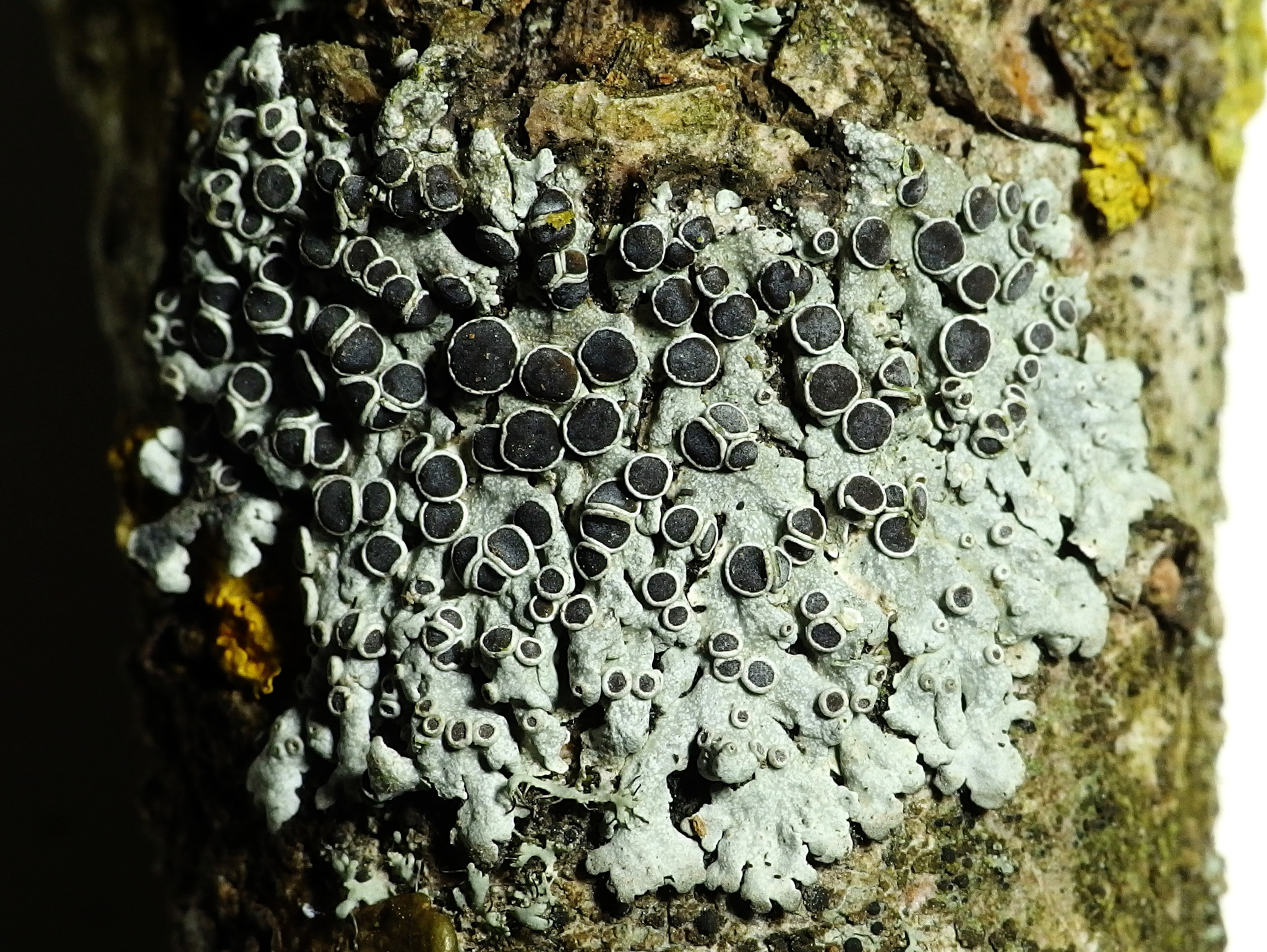
- Physcia aipolia

Scientific classification
- Kingdom: Fungi
- Division: Ascomycota
- Class: Lecanoromycetes
- Order: Caliciales
- Family: Physciaceae; Zahlbr. (1898)

Type genus
- Physcia (Schreb.) Michx. (1803)

= Physciaceae =

Family of lichen-forming fungi

The Physciaceae are a family of mostly lichen-forming fungi belonging to the class Lecanoromycetes in the division Ascomycota. A 2016 estimate placed 19 genera and 601 species in the family.

== Taxonomy ==
Physciaceae was formalised by Alexander Zahlbruckner in Adolf Engler's Syllabus (1898), with Physcia as the type genus. In a set of conservation proposals intended to stabilise long-used family names, Hawksworth and Eriksson (1988) recommended conserving Physciaceae against the earlier name Pyxinaceae (basionym: "trib." Pyxineae E.M.Fries, 1825), arguing that Pyxinaceae had not been taken up in standard works and that Physciaceae was firmly established in the literature. They characterised Physciaceae as one of the major families of the Lecanorales, then comprising about 20 genera and roughly 850 species, many of them familiar macrolichens.

Hawksworth and Eriksson also noted historical alternatives that do not displace Physciaceae: Körber's "Anaptychiaceae" (attributed to Massalongo) proved to be a tribal-rank usage without a diagnosis, so it was not validly published; had it been valid and pre-1898, it would likewise have required conservation of Physciaceae over that name.

== Description ==
The Physiaceae includes various growth forms such as foliose, fruticose, squamulose, stipitate, crustose, and even evanescent types (where certain parts, such as basal squamules, become less noticeable or disappear over time as other structures develop). Some members of this family may also be lichenicolous, meaning they grow on other lichens. These lichens can exhibit features such as lobules, isidia, and soredia, or may lack them entirely.

The upper cortex of Physiaceae lichens can be prosoplectenchymatous, paraplectenchymatous, or absent. Their photobiont, or the symbiotic algae living within the lichen, is typically a unicellular green alga from the genus Trebouxia, with a diameter ranging from 5 to 20 μm. The medulla can vary from poorly to well-developed or may even be absent, and it often contains lichen substances. The lower cortex can be prosoplectenchymatous, paraplectenchymatous, or absent, with the lower surface either possessing or lacking rhizines. A prothallus may be present or absent.

Physiaceae lichens produce ascomata, which can be either apothecia or mazaedia. Their apothecia can be immersed, sessile, or short-stalked, with a more or less distinct exciple. The disc, when present, is generally round and ranges from flat to convex, displaying colours from brown to dark reddish-brown or black. A thalline exciple may or may not be present, while the proper exciple can be thin and weakly pigmented or well-developed and darkly pigmented.

The epihymenium can be brown-black, brown, or green, while the hymenium is colourless or partly green, with or without oil droplets. The hypothecium can vary in colour from colourless to yellow-brown, brown, or dark brown. paraphyses are simple or sparingly branched in the uppermost part, with thickened apices often capped by a brown-pigmented layer. The asci are clavate, typically with 8 spores (but sometimes as few as 2 or as many as 16) and a well-developed amyloid tholus, a paler conical axial mass, and an ocular chamber.

Ascospores in the Physiaceae have a single septum, olive to brown in colour, and ellipsoidal in shape, often displaying uneven wall thickenings. The conidiomata are pycnidial, either immersed or superficial. Conidia can be formed acrogenously or pleurogenously, and they can be ellipsoidal, bacilliform, fusiform, or filiform.

== Genera ==
This is a list of the genera contained within the Physciaceae, based on a 2020 review and summary of ascomycete classification; as well as several genera that have been circumscribed or resurrected since then. Following the genus name is the taxonomic authority, year of publication, and the number of species:

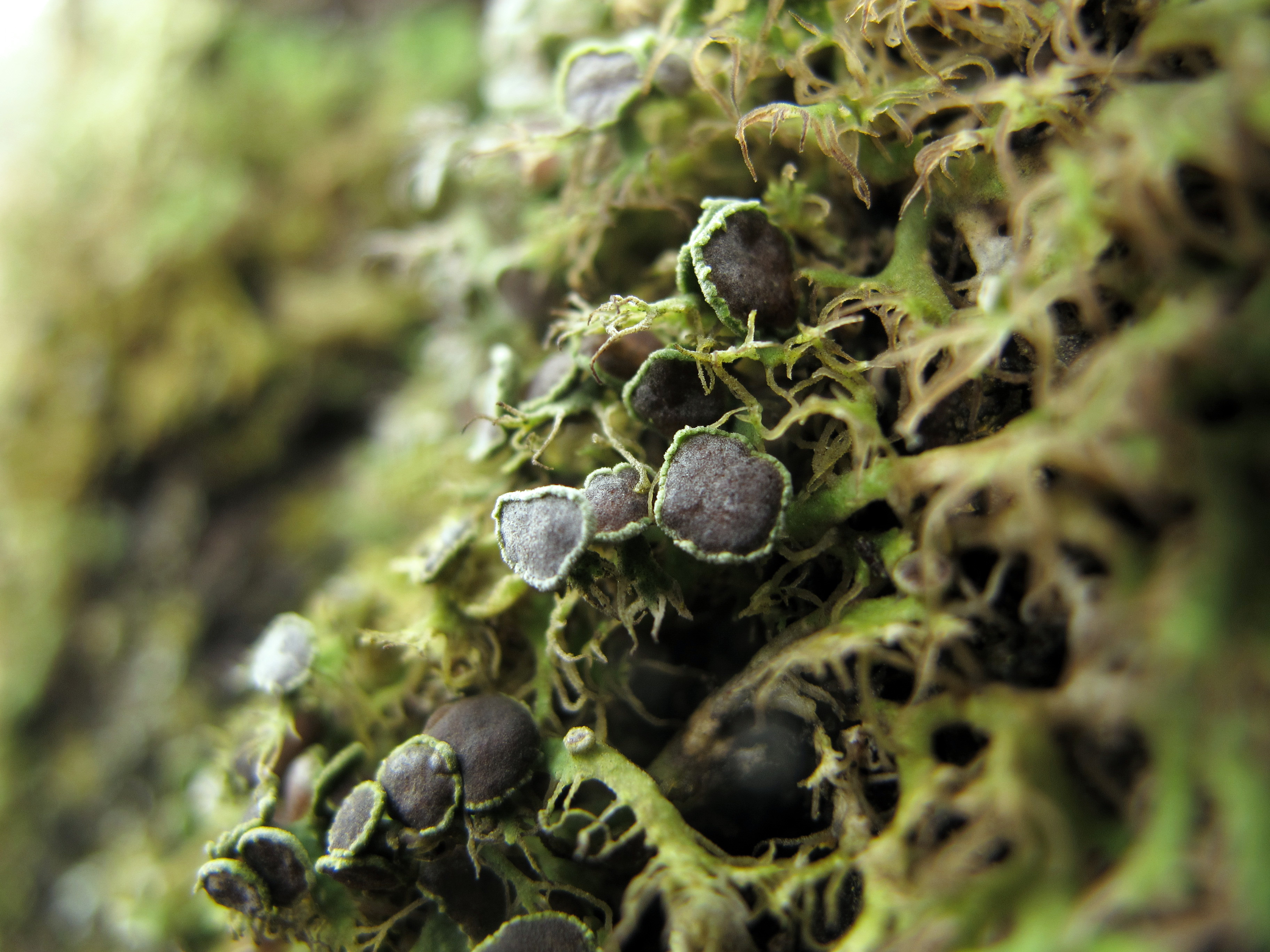
Anaptychia ciliaris

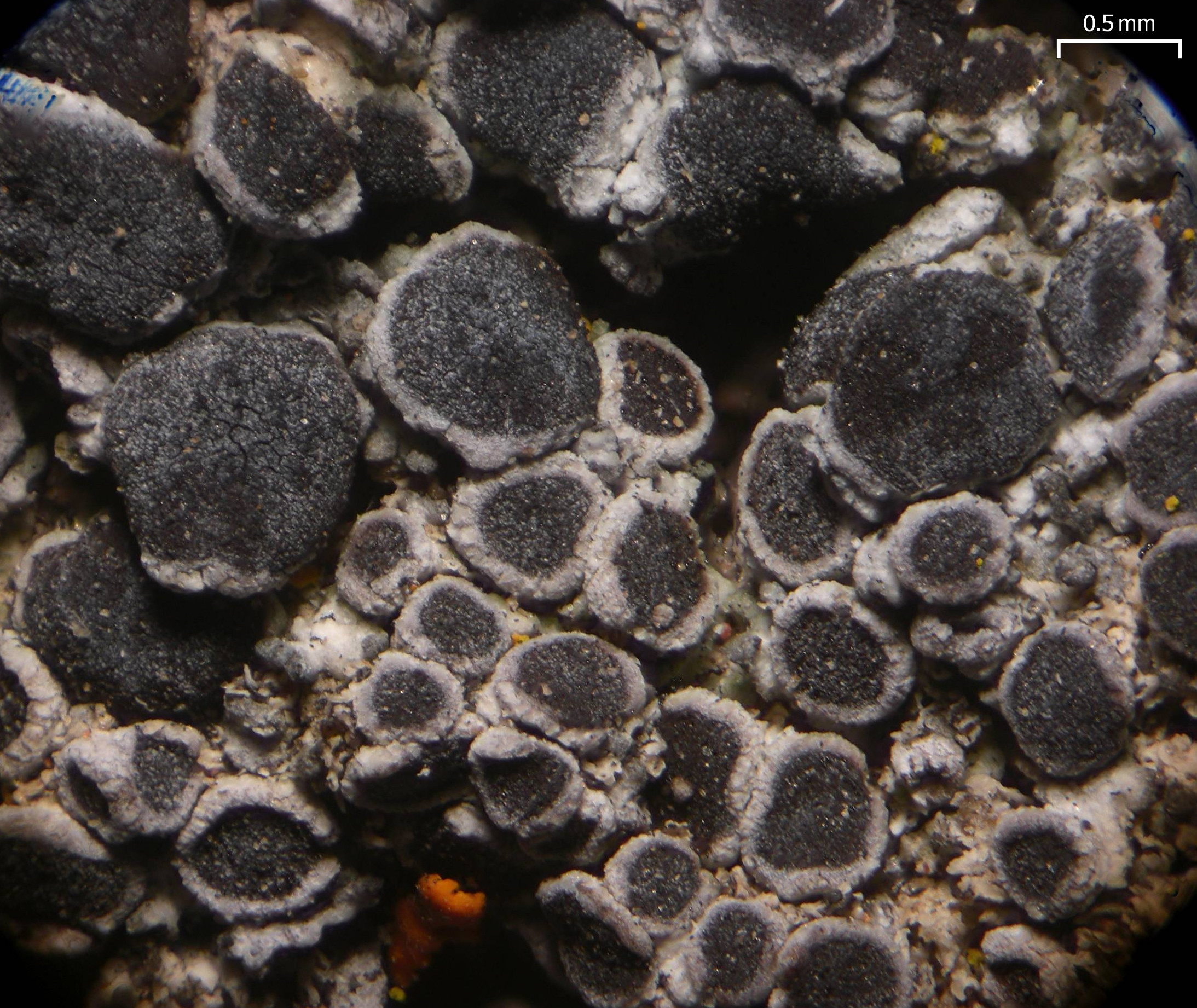
Rinodina roscida

- Anaptychia Körb. (1848) – about 15 spp.
- Awasthia Essl. (1978) – 1 sp.
- Coscinocladium Kunze (1846) – 2 spp.
- Helmutiopsis S.Y.Kondr., Lőkös & Hur (2021) – 3 spp.
- Heterodermia Trevis. (1868) – about 90 spp.
- Huriopsis S.Y.Kondr. & Lőkös (2021) – 7 spp.
- Hyperphyscia Müll.Arg. (1894) – 9 spp.
- Johnsheardia S.Y.Kondr., Kärnefelt & A.Thell (2021) – 5 spp.
- Kashiwadia S.Y.Kondr., Lőkös & Hur (2014) – 1 sp.
- Klauskalbia S.Y.Kondr., Lőkös, E.Farkas & Hur (2021) – 4 spp.
- Kudratovia S.Y.Kondr., Lőkös & Hur (2021) – 8 spp.
- Kurokawia S.Y.Kondr., Lőkös & Hur (2021) – 7 spp.
- Leucodermia Kalb (2015) – 10 spp.
- Mischoblastia A.Massal. (1852) – 3 spp.
- Mobergia H.Mayrhofer & Sheard (1992) – 1 sp.
- Oxnerella S.Y.Kondr., Lőkös & Hur (2014) – 1 spp.
- Phaeophyscia Mob. (1977) – 66 spp.
- Phaeorrhiza H.Mayrhofer & Poelt (1979) – 2 spp.
- Physcia (Schreb.) Michaux (1803) – about 80 spp.
- Physciella Essl. (1986) – 4 spp.
- Physconia Poelt (1965) – about 25 spp.
- Polyblastidium Kalb (2015) – 18 spp.
- Rinodina (Ach.) Gray (1821) – about 300 spp
- Rinodinella H.Mayrhofer & Poelt (1978) – 6 spp.
- Tornabea Østh. (1980) – 1 spp.

The genus Culbersonia, previously classified in the Physciaceae due to its morphological features, has been shown with molecular phylogenetics to belong to the Caliciaceae.
