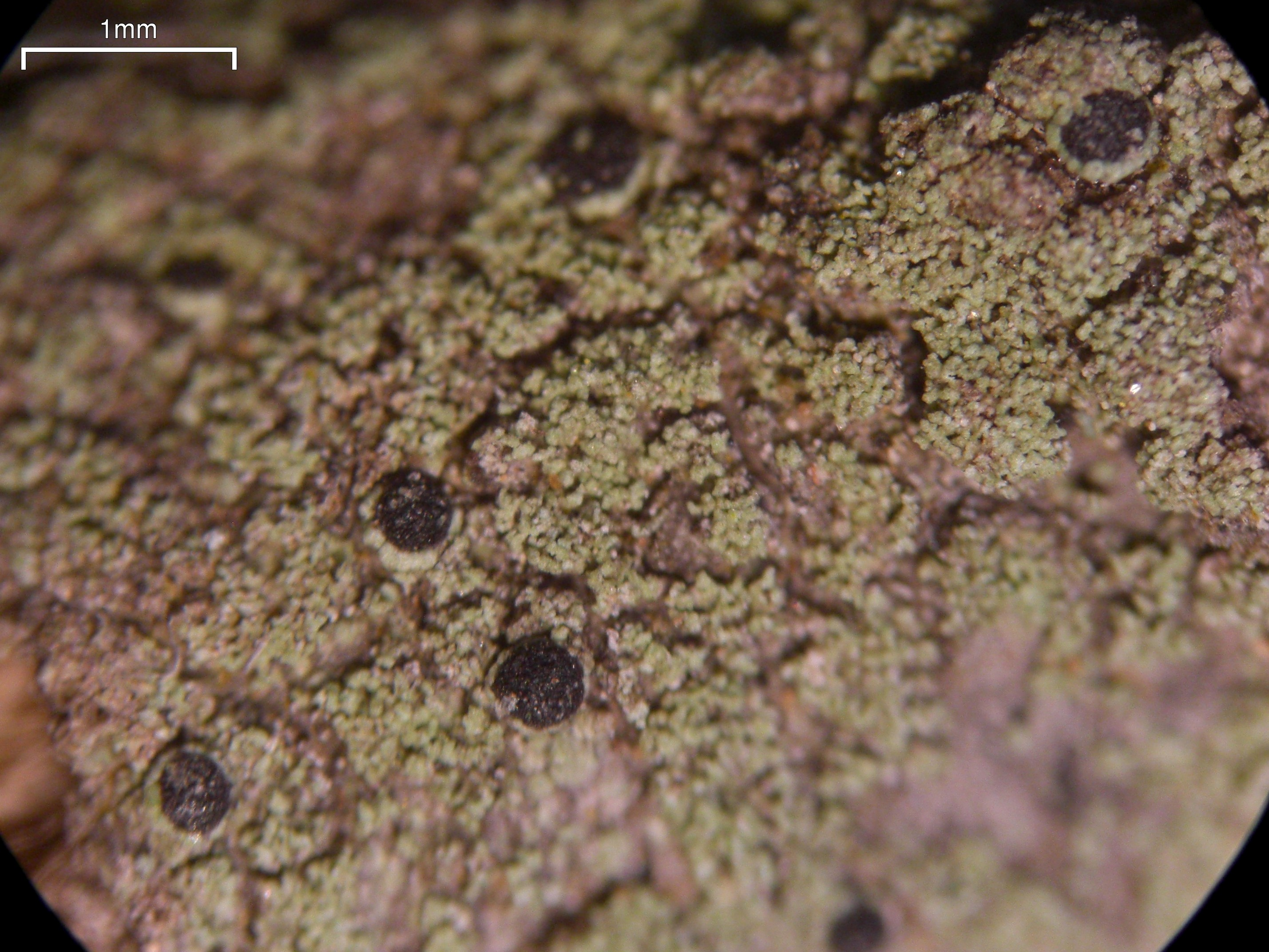
- Rinodina disjuncta

Scientific classification
- Domain: Eukaryota
- Kingdom: Fungi
- Division: Ascomycota
- Class: Lecanoromycetes
- Order: Caliciales
- Family: Physciaceae
- Genus: Rinodina (Ach.) Gray (1821)

Type species
- Rinodina sophodes (1852) (Ach.) A.Massal.

Species
- ~265

Synonyms
- Lecanora subdiv. Rinodina Ach. (1810); Courtoisia L.Marchand (1830); Berengeria Trevis. (1852); Mischoblastia A.Massal. (1852); Placothallia Trevis. (1852); Rinodina subsect. Pachysporaria Malme (1902); Pseudobuellia B.de Lesd. (1907); Dictyorinis Clem. (1909); Merorinis Clem. (1909); Pleorinis Clem. (1909); Malmia M.Choisy (1931); Mischolecia M.Choisy (1931); Pachysporaria (Malme) M.Choisy (1949); Rhinodinomyces E.A.Thomas ex Cif. & Tomas. (1953)

= Rinodina =

Genus of lichens

Rinodina is a genus of lichen-forming fungi in the family Physciaceae. The genus has a widespread distribution and contains about 265 species. It is hypothesized that a few saxicolous species common to dry regions of western North America, southern Europe, North Africa and central Asia may date back 240 million years to the Middle Triassic.

== See also ==
List of Rinodina species.
