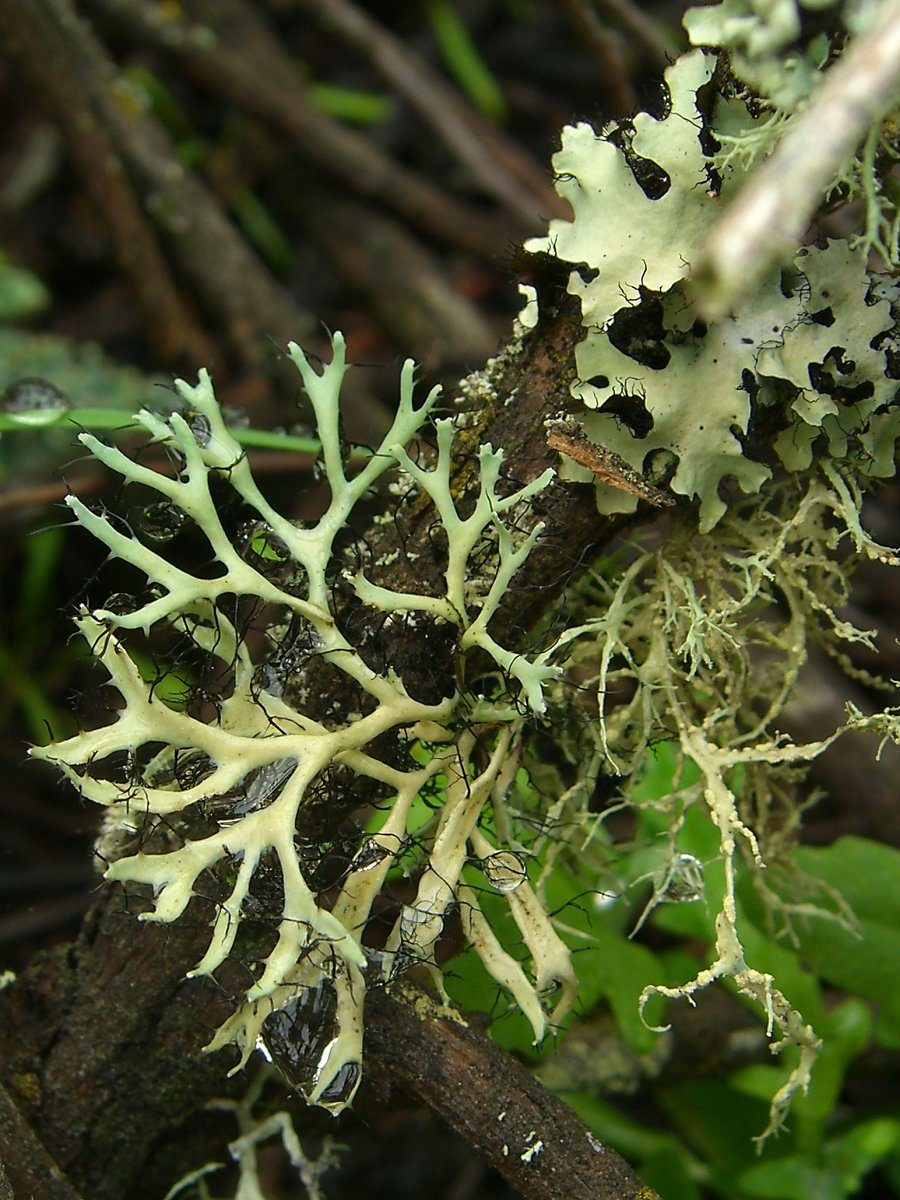
- Loose rosette of Leucodermia leucomelos on a twig, showing narrow, dichotomously branching lobes and long, dark marginal cilia

Scientific classification
- Kingdom: Fungi
- Division: Ascomycota
- Class: Lecanoromycetes
- Order: Caliciales
- Family: Physciaceae
- Genus: Leucodermia
- Species: L. leucomelos

Binomial name
- Leucodermia leucomelos (L.) Kalb (2015)

Synonyms
- List: Lichen leucomelos L. (1763); Lobaria leucomelos (L.) Raeusch. (1797); Parmelia leucomelos (L.) Ach. (1803); Physcia leucomelos (L.) Michx. (1803); Borrera leucomelos (L.) Ach. [as 'leucomela'] (1810); Parmelia speciosa var. leucomelos (L.) Eschw. (1833); Physcia speciosa var. leucomelos (L.) Tuck. (1860); Hagenia leucomelos (L.) Schwend. [as 'leucomela'] (1860); Physcia leucomelos f. albociliata Nyl. (1863); Physcia speciosa subsp. leucomelos (L.) Tuck. (1882); Anaptychia leucomelos (L.) A.Massal. (1890); Teloschistes leucomelos (L.) A.Schneid. (1898); Anaptychia leucomelos f. albociliata Hue (1899); Xanthoria leucomelos (L.) Horw. (1912); Anaptychia albociliata (Hue) Vain. (1926); Anaptychia ophioglossa f. albociliata (Hue) Kurok. (1960); Heterodermia leucomelos (L.) Poelt (1965); Heterodermia leucomelos f. albociliata (Hue) D.D.Awasthi (1973)

= Leucodermia leucomelos =

Species of lichen-forming fungus

Leucodermia leucomelos is a species of fruticose lichen in the family Physciaceae, and the type species of the genus Leucodermia. This species is widely distributed in tropical, subtropical, and warm temperate regions, where it grows on both trees and rock faces. The species forms pale, narrow branches 4–8 cm (1 5/8–3 1/8 in) long that divide repeatedly as they grow. The cream-coloured to whitish branches have distinctive long, dark hairs (cilia) along their edges, and typically grow in loose clusters on trees or rocks. It usually reproduces through powdery patches (soralia) on its lower surface, though it sometimes produces small disc-shaped fruiting bodies (apothecia).

The species shows physiological adaptations to different light environments within the same habitat. Populations growing in shaded locations have higher protective mechanisms against sudden light exposure from sunflecks. Meanwhile, populations in sunny areas achieve higher rates of photosynthesis. This adaptability to varying light conditions appears to be an important factor in the species' widespread distribution across different forest types, allowing it to persist both in well-lit and deeply shaded locations while maintaining photosynthetic efficiency through specialized physiological responses.

Chemical analysis shows that L. leucomelos contains several biologically active compounds, including atranorin, salazinic acid, and other substances that show antifungal properties. Carl Linnaeus first described the species in 1763. Since then, it has undergone multiple taxonomic revisions, including debates about the correct spelling of its name. It is now recognized as the type species of the genus Leucodermia. While widespread globally, it is considered a species of conservation concern in some regions, particularly in the Pacific Northwest of North America, where it is designated as a Sensitive Species by both the U.S. Forest Service and Bureau of Land Management.

== Taxonomy ==
It was originally described by Carl Linnaeus in 1763, as Lichen leucomelos. His diagnosis of the lichen was as follows (translated from Latin): "A linear, branched, slightly black-ciliated foliose lichen, with somewhat pedunculate, radiating peltate scales. Found in South America. Lobes branched at the base, linear with a diameter of one line, palm-sized, spreading, uneven, milky, smooth on top, slightly floury underneath, infrequently ciliated on the edge with longer black, somewhat branched hairs. The peltate scales are white, hemispherical, concave, pedunculated, and slightly radiated at the edge: with slender, white teeth."

The holotype specimen of L. leucomelos is preserved in the Linnaean Herbarium (LINN 1273.109). The specimen, which was sent to Linnaeus from America (marked 'Amer.' by Linnaeus), formed the basis for his diagnostic phrase-name and description in 1763. On the type specimen sheet, Linnaeus himself wrote leucomelus, attempting to latinise the Greek black-white epithet.

Two subspecies were recognized by T.D.V. Swinscow and Hildur Krog in 1976. Subspecies boryii was previously treated as a distinct species, Anaptychia neoleucomelaena, by Syo Kurokawa in 1961. Klaus Kalb also suggested recognizing this taxon at the species level.

In 2023, Frank Bungartz formally established the new combination Leucodermia leucomelos f. albociliata, based on Anaptychia leucomelos f. albociliata Hue (1899). This form is characterized by its distinctive white cilia, in contrast to the typical black cilia of the species. While Kalb had illustrated this form in the 2015 paper establishing the genus Leucodermia, the combination had not been formally published at that time since no MycoBank number was registered for the forma albociliata.

=== Naming ===
The scientific name Leucodermia leucomelos has a complex nomenclatural history. The specific epithet, derived from Greek elements meaning "white-black", has been subject to various spelling interpretations since Linnaeus first published it as leucomelos in 1763. On the type specimen sheet, Linnaeus wrote leucomelus, apparently attempting to latinise the Greek components. While some later authors used variants like leucomelaena or argued that leucomelos was a misprint for leucomelas (Greek for white-black), Linnaeus consistently used leucomelos in his publications, including Systema Naturae. A significant variation occurred when Erik Acharius introduced leucomela in his 1803 combination Parmelia leucomela. Though Salisbury's 1978 analysis argued for leucomelas as the correct form, nomenclatural specialists maintained that since Linnaeus's intended spelling could not be definitively proven, the original leucomelos must be retained under Article 73 of the International Code of Botanical Nomenclature. This spelling was formally proposed for conservation in 2012, and in 2017, the Nomenclature Committee for Fungi recommended its conservation with 70% support.

The species has undergone multiple generic reassignments, being placed in Parmelia, Physcia, Borrera, Anaptychia, and Heterodermia before its current placement in Leucodermia. The generic name Leucodermia itself combines elements from the species' previous classification ("ser. leucomelaenae") with Heterodermia.

In English, the species is known by the common names "elegant fringe lichen" and "elegant centipede," both referring to its characteristic appearance with long, dark marginal cilia.

== Description ==
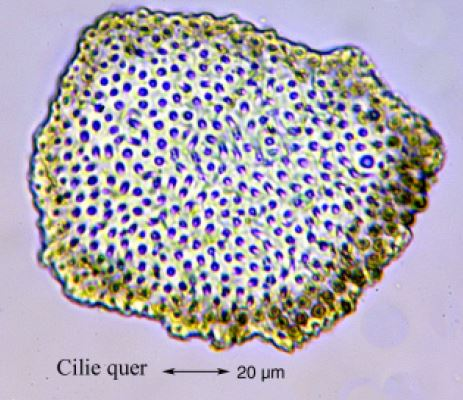
Cross-section of a cilium from Leucodermia leucomelos

Leucodermia leucomelos has a foliose to somewhat fruticose thallus that grows loosely attached or partly free from its substrate in a characteristic leucomelos-growth form, forming loose circular patterns (rosettes) or tangled mats 5–15 cm (2.0–5.9 in) wide. The thallus consists of elongated, narrow lobes 0.5–4 mm (0.020–0.157 in) wide that branch dichotomously and bear long, typically branched, dark marginal cilia. The upper surface is whitish to cream-coloured, smooth and somewhat shiny; the lower surface is usually white, sometimes pale to pinkish brown and rarely purple, and lacks a cortex except at the margins as well as rhizines, appearing arachnoid (cobwebby) to woolly or powdery. Soredia are variably developed, typically arising on the distal portion of the lower surface which becomes exposed as the lobes curl upwards.

The species rarely produces apothecia; when present they are lecanorine (with a thalline margin), subterminal and somewhat stalked, and measure about 2–5 mm (0.1–0.2 in) across with margins ranging from crenulate to lobulate and with small triangular lobules up to 3 mm long. The disc is dark brown to black and may be pruinose. The asci are club-shaped (clavate) and eight-spored with a Lecanora-type structure and characteristic iodine reactions; the ascospores are brown, ellipsoid and 1-septate, measuring 30–50 x 15–23 μm, and show Polyblastidium-type development with sporoblastidia. Pycnidia are rare and immersed, producing hyaline bacilliform conidia measuring 4–5 x 1 μm. The photobiont is a chlorococcoid green alga.

=== Similar species ===
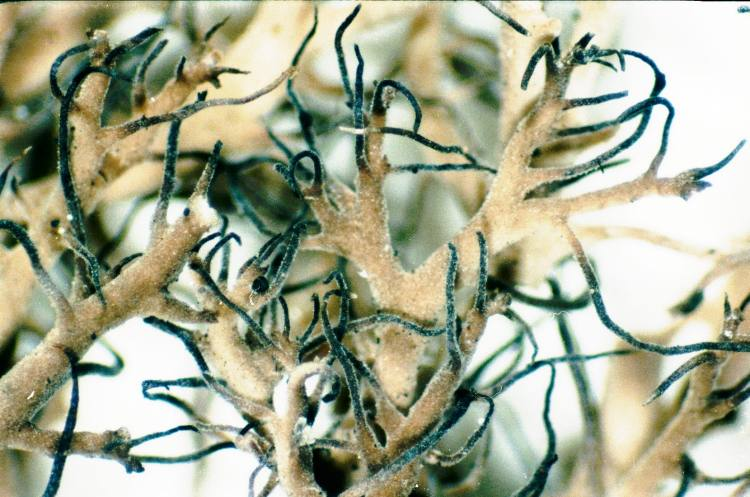
Anaptychia setifera is a potential lookalike

The similar species Leucodermia boryii distinguishes itself from L. leucomelos by several characteristics. Compared to L. leucomelos, L. boryii typically has slimmer lobes, more curled tips on the distal lobes, and a web-like texture underneath rather than a powdery one. Additionally, L. boryii has soralia less frequently but has apothecia more often and does not contain depsidones, including salazinic acid.

Several other lichens can be confused with L. leucomelos due to similar morphological features. Leucodermia appalachensis appears very similar but can be distinguished by its pale yellow lower surface and different chemical reactions (its medulla remains yellow rather than turning red with potassium hydroxide). Three species of Heterodermia – H. echinata, H. erinacea, and H. namaquana – have broader lobes than L. leucomelos, though among these only H. namaquana produces soredia. Anaptychia setifera may also resemble L. leucomelos in having narrow ascending branches with long marginal cilia, but it differs in having dusky brownish-grey, more convex branches that lack atranorin (showing no reaction to potassium hydroxide), and does not produce soredia.

== Chemistry ==
Standard chemical spot tests show distinct reactions in different parts of the thallus: the cortex is K+ (yellow), (C−), and P+ (faintly yellow). The spot test reactions in the medulla are K+ (yellow then red with potassium hydroxide (K+) and P+ (yellow-orange). Chemical analysis, using thin-layer chromatography and other methods, has revealed multiple lichen products in Leucodermia leucomelos. The cortex contains atranorin and chloroatranorin. The medulla contains several substances, including atranorin, zeorin, glyceryl trilinolate, and various triterpenes such as salazinic acid and consalazinic acid.

Water extracts from the lichen show significant antifungal activity. They are effective against the plant pathogen Fusarium oxysporum and several species of Aspergillus, including A. candidus, A. flavus, A. fumigatus, and A. parasiticus. This antifungal activity appears to be related to the presence of salazinic acid combined with zeorin and other lichen substances.

== Habitat and distribution ==
The North American range of Leucodermia leucomelos extends from Belleville, Ontario in the north, south to Mexico. The lichen grows in select locations spanning the central/southern Appalachian Mountains down to Florida and stretches along the North American west coast from Vancouver Island through Mexico and into Central America. Despite its broad distribution, it is not regarded as a particularly common lichen in North America. In Ontario, Canada, it was recorded for the first time in over 150 years in 2019. In the Azores, where it is abundant, it grows on sunny coastal rocks and walls to mossy trees in the moist cloud forest to elevations of 1,000 m (3,300 ft). In Afromontane forests of South Africa, L. leucomelos occurs at altitudes between 1500 and 1600 metres, where it experiences a climate characterized by warm, wet summers and dry, cold winters with temperatures reaching freezing. In these habitats, the species shows particular affinity for Leucosidea sericea, though it can colonise various other tree species.

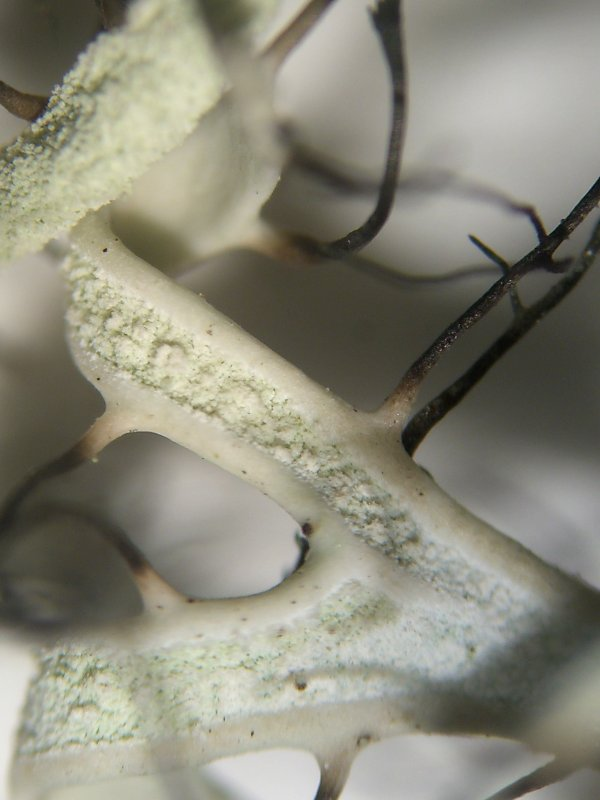
Lower surface, at 30x showing ecorticate, arachnoid medulla

In the Pacific Northwest of North America, Leucodermia leucomelos is a rare coastal lichen. It grows in forested dunes, marine terraces, and headlands up to elevations of 250 m (820 ft). It is located within 4 km (2.5 mi) of the coast, specifically in the marine fog belt stretching from Point Reyes near San Francisco to the boundary of Oregon and Washington. These lichens are prevalent in exposed microsites in both young and mature forests, predominantly within Sitka spruce forest ecosystems. They can also be found in forest types dominated by lodgepole pine, grand fir, and western hemlock, often accompanied by a dense shrub understory. Leucodermia leucomelos is mostly associated with twigs and branches of Picea sitchensis and Pinus contorta, but it also grows on Abies grandis, Tsuga heterophylla, Alnus rubra (red alder), Baccharis pilularis (coyotebrush), Cytisus scoparius (scotchbroom), Ceanothus sp., Cupressus macrocarpa (Monterey cypress), Arctostaphylos uva-ursi, and Garrya elliptica (silktassel). Other lichens found alongside it include Ramalina farinacea, R. roeslerii, Tuckermanopsis chlorophylla, Hypogymnia heterophylla, and Parmotrema chinense.

Leucodermia leucomelos is widespread in eastern Africa except for desert areas, and has been recorded growing at altitudes up to 3,500 m (11,500 ft). In this area, recorded habitats include mossy rocks, earth banks, and the trunks, branches, and twigs of trees and shrubs, with a preference for shade.

== Ecology ==
In the Canary Islands, L. leucomelos is a characteristic species of undisturbed laurel forests, being present in over half of studied forest plots. It appears to be sensitive to environmental conditions, showing a preference for ancient, well-preserved forest environments with high humidity and low levels of disturbance.

A 2019 metagenomics study found that L. leucomelos was one of only nine lichen species (out of 339 studied) that contained cystobasidiomycete yeasts in its thallus. While these basidiomycete yeasts were previously thought to be ubiquitous across lichens, L. leucomelos was among just 2.7% of species studied that showed evidence of hosting these organisms. The yeast sequences detected in L. leucomelos had coverage comparable to that of the primary lichen fungus itself, suggesting they are genuine symbionts rather than chance contaminants.

Lichenicolous (lichen-dwelling) fungi that are known to parasitise L. leucomelos include Arthonia leucomelodis, Abrothallus heterodermiicola, Leptosphaeria leucomelaria, and Stigmidium heterodermiae. Zyzygomyces leucodermiae and Tremella leucodermiae are both southern hemisphere-basidiomycete lichenicolous fungi that use L. leucomelos as a host.

=== Photosynthetic adaptations ===
Leucodermia leucomelos demonstrates physiological plasticity in its photosynthetic responses to different light environments. Research has shown distinct adaptations between populations growing in sun-exposed and shaded microhabitats, even within the same forest stand. Shade-dwelling populations exhibit higher non-photochemical quenching (NPQ), a protective mechanism that helps prevent photodamage during sudden light exposure from sunflecks—brief periods of direct sunlight that penetrate the canopy. These shade populations can also rapidly reduce their NPQ when light levels decrease, allowing efficient photosynthesis to resume after a sunfleck passes. In contrast, sun-exposed populations typically achieve higher maximum photosynthetic rates but show lower NPQ values.

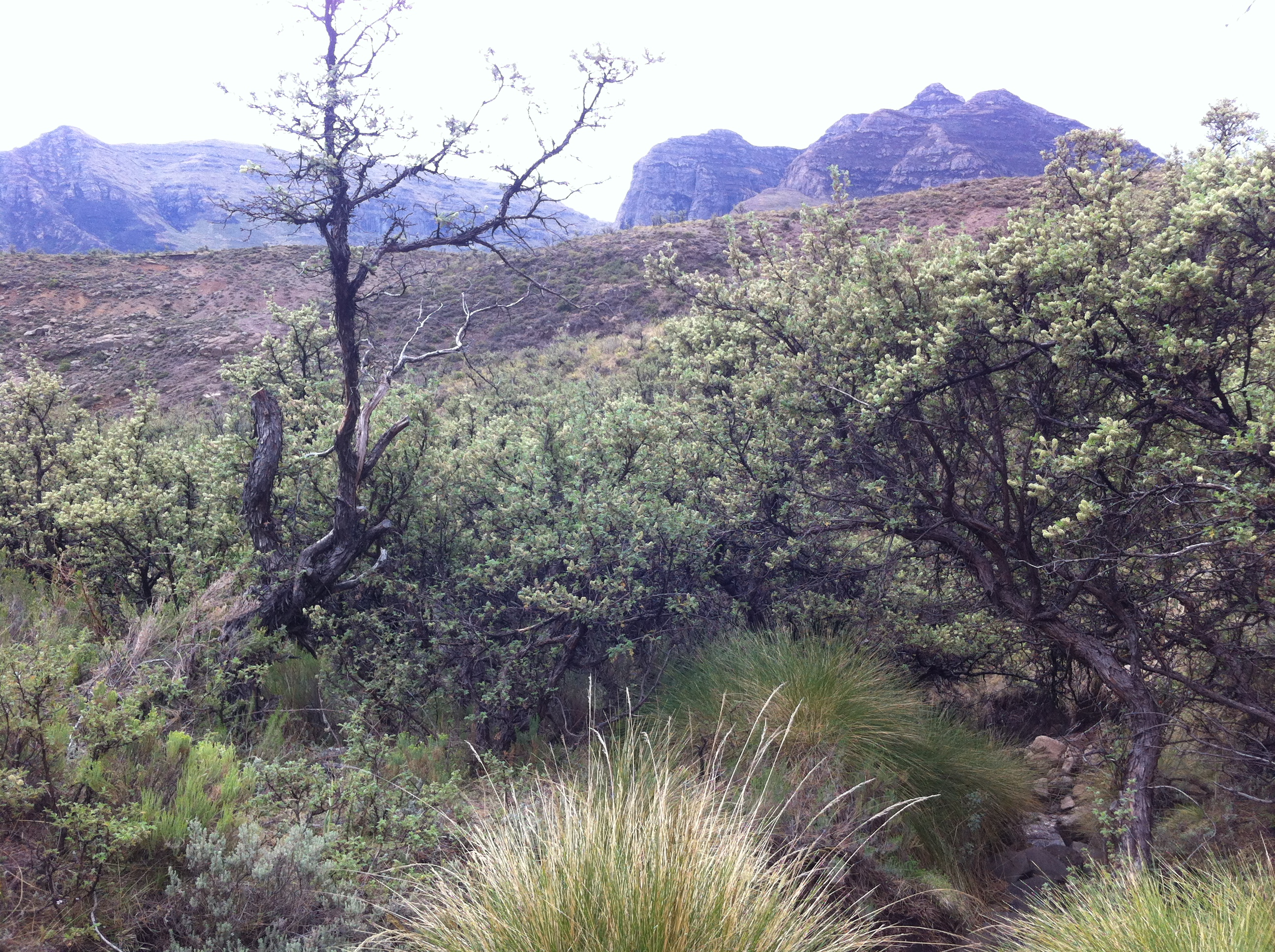
Leucosidea sericea, a favoured host shrub of Leucodermia leucomelos in montane habitats, photographed in the uplands of Lesotho

The species displays considerable ecological amplitude in its choice of microhabitats. This is particularly evident in Afromontane forests, where it colonizes everything from minor twigs at the canopy periphery to main branches and trunks deep within the canopy. These habitats experience warm, wet summers and cold winters with temperatures dropping to freezing, and the species shows particular affinity for certain host trees, especially Leucosidea sericea. This adaptability to varying light conditions, with populations showing physiological adaptations specific to each microhabitat, appears to be an important factor in the species' widespread distribution across different forest types. Through specialized physiological responses, it maintains photosynthetic efficiency whether in well-lit or deeply shaded locations.

== Biomonitoring ==
Leucodermia leucomelos shows more preference for disturbed sites (pasture and urban site) with less canopy cover, low humidity and more light availability. Because the presence of the species indicates exposed conditions, it has been suggested for use as a bioindicator of the effects of land-use changes due to urbanisation in riparian ecosystems of the Andes in southern Ecuador.

== Conservation ==
=== Conservation status ===
Leucodermia leucomelos is considered a species of conservation concern in the Pacific Northwest of North America, where it has been granted various protective designations. Under the Northwest Forest Plan, it was initially considered at risk due to its rarity and limited distribution. The species was managed under Survey and Manage guidelines from 1994–2004, requiring protection of known sites and pre-disturbance surveys. As of 2025, it is designated as a sensitive species by both the U.S. Forest Service (Region 6) and Bureau of Land Management in Oregon.

NatureServe assigned the species a Global Heritage Rank of G3 (rare or uncommon but not immediately imperiled). In Oregon, it holds a State Heritage Rank of S3 (rare/uncommon) and is listed on the Oregon Heritage List 4 (species of conservation concern). While previously considered threatened or endangered within Oregon, increased documentation of populations has reduced its perceived level of imperilment.

=== Threats ===
Several factors threaten the long-term persistence of L. leucomelos populations. Recreational activities pose a significant risk to existing populations, particularly through trail construction, off-road vehicle use, and foot traffic that can damage populations through trampling and habitat degradation. The construction of roads, buildings, and other infrastructure along the coast has eliminated potential habitat in many areas. Commercial collection of mosses and other forest products may also inadvertently impact lichen populations.

Environmental changes represent another major threat category. Climate change is of particular concern, especially through potential alterations to coastal fog patterns and winter temperature regimes. Air pollution, especially from vehicle emissions and industrial sources, may affect populations as the species appears sensitive to sulfur dioxide and nitrogen oxides. Additionally, invasion by exotic plants like European beachgrass (Ammophila arenaria) and Scotch broom (Cytisus scoparius) can alter habitat conditions necessary for the species' survival.

Forest management activities can also impact populations through timber harvesting that removes colonized trees or alters forest structure. Changes to local hydrology through forest management activities and modifications to natural fire regimes can further affect habitat quality.

=== Conservation measures ===
Several management approaches have been implemented to protect L. leucomelos on federal lands. Known sites are designated for protection and management, with buffer zones maintained around populations to preserve microclimate conditions. Some populations receive additional protection within designated areas such as Research Natural Areas and Areas of Critical Environmental Concern.

Management guidelines establish specific protective measures for the species. Land managers must conduct pre-disturbance surveys before any ground-disturbing activities and restrict commercial collection of forest products where populations exist. They direct recreational activities away from sensitive areas and implement fire management guidelines to maintain habitat quality while protecting populations.

Conservation efforts extend beyond direct protection to include comprehensive monitoring and research programs. Scientists regularly monitor known populations to track their status and threats, conduct research on habitat requirements and population dynamics, and assess air quality near key populations to evaluate potential impacts from pollution.

=== Population status ===
The species reaches its greatest abundance in the Oregon Dunes region and the Samoa Peninsula of California's Humboldt County. Within these areas, it can be locally common on suitable substrates, particularly in areas with consistent coastal fog influence. However, many populations are small and isolated, which may affect their long-term genetic viability. The overall population trend is not well documented, though historical records suggest the species may have declined in some areas due to coastal development and habitat modification.

== See also ==
- List of lichens named by Carl Linnaeus
