= A. candidus =

A. candidus may refer to:

- Abacetus candidus, a ground beetle
- Actinomyces candidus, a synonym of Streptomyces candidus, a bacterium
- Apolychrosis candidus, a moth found in Mexico
- Aspergillus candidus, a fungus
