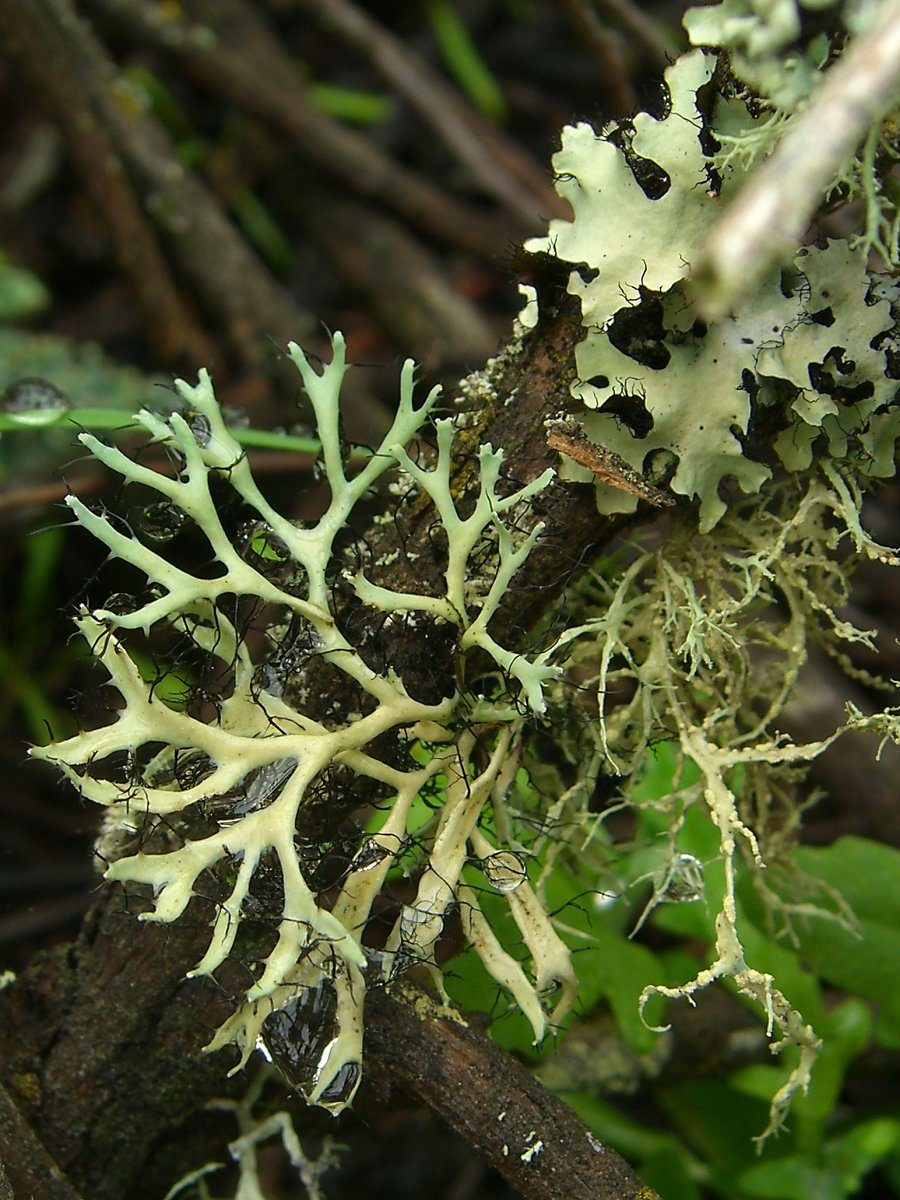
- Leucodermia leucomelos is the prominent lichen on the lower left

Scientific classification
- Domain: Eukaryota
- Kingdom: Fungi
- Division: Ascomycota
- Class: Lecanoromycetes
- Order: Caliciales
- Family: Physciaceae
- Genus: Leucodermia; Kalb (2015)

Type species
- Leucodermia leucomelos (L.) Kalb (2015)

Synonyms
- Anaptychia Körb. sect. Polyblastidium Kurok. ser. leucomelaenae Kurok. (1962)

= Leucodermia =

Genus of fungi

Leucodermia is a genus of lichen-forming fungi in the family Physciaceae.

== Taxonomy ==
The genus was circumscribed by German lichenologist Klaus Kalb in 2015, with Leucodermia leucomelos assigned as the type species. Leucodermia includes lichens that were previously classified in genus Anaptychia section Polyblastidium series leucomelaenae. The genus name combines leucomelaenae with Heterodermia. Klaus included 10 species in his original circumscription of the genus; Leucodermia guzmaniana was added as a newly described species in 2019.

== Description ==
Characteristics of genus Leucodermia include a thallus that is either leafy (foliose) to somewhat bushy (subfruticose) with lobes that are linear-elongate, ribbon-like, and dichotomously branched. The lobes have conspicuous, long rhizines at their margins. The thallus is loosely attached to the substrate and lacks a lower cortex. The apothecia often have pruinose discs and Polyblastidium-type ascospores, with sporoblastidia (small chambers in a thick-walled spore).

== Species ==
- Leucodermia appalachensis (Kurok.) Kalb (2015) – United States
- Leucodermia arsenei (Kurok.) Kalb (2015) – Mexico
- Leucodermia borphyllidiata Kalb & Meesim (2015) – Thailand
- Leucodermia boryi (Fée) Kalb (2015) – widespread
- Leucodermia ciliatomarginata (Linder) Kalb (2015)
- Leucodermia circinalis (Zahlbr.) Kalb (2015) – South America
- Leucodermia fertilis (Moberg) Kalb (2015) – South America
- Leucodermia guzmaniana Guzmán-Guillermo, Díaz-Escandón & Medel (2019) – Mexico
- Leucodermia leucomelos (L.) Kalb (2015) – widespread
- Leucodermia lutescens (Kurok.) Kalb (2015) – Mexico; South America
- Leucodermia vulgaris (Vain.) Kalb (2015) – South America
