= Apolychrosis ferruginus =

Scientific classification
- Domain: Eukaryota
- Kingdom: Animalia
- Phylum: Arthropoda
- Class: Insecta
- Order: Lepidoptera
- Family: Tortricidae
- Genus: Apolychrosis
- Species: A. ferruginus

Binomial name
- Apolychrosis ferruginus Pogue, in Cibrian-Tovar et al., 1986

Species of moth

Apolychrosis ferruginus is a species of moth of the family Tortricidae. It is found in Tlaxcala, Mexico.
