= Heterodermia rubrotricha =

Scientific classification
- Kingdom: Fungi
- Division: Ascomycota
- Class: Lecanoromycetes
- Order: Caliciales
- Family: Physciaceae
- Genus: Heterodermia
- Species: H. rubrotricha

Binomial name
- Heterodermia rubrotricha Weerakoon & Aptroot (2013)
- Holotype: Mahagasthotte Upper division, Sri Lanka

Species of lichen

Heterodermia rubrotricha is a foliose lichen species in the family Physciaceae. It is found in Sri Lanka.

== Taxonomy ==
Heterodermia rubrotricha was formally described by Gothamie Weerakoon and André Aptroot in their 2013 study of lichen biodiversity in Sri Lanka. The species is closely related to Heterodermia boryi, sharing a similar lobe configuration, but differs distinctly by having red pigmentation on its marginal cilia. Another related species, Heterodermia vulgaris, also exhibits red pigmentation, but in that species, the pigment occurs over the entire lower surface rather than just the cilia.

The species epithet rubrotricha is derived from Latin, referring to the red coloration of its cilia.

== Description ==
The thallus of Heterodermia rubrotricha is foliose and can form tufts up to 10 cm in diameter. It features whitish lobes that grow linearly, ascending or becoming pendulous, reaching lengths up to 4 cm and widths of 0.9–1.6 mm. The lobes taper at the tips, where they are narrower (approximately 0.4 mm wide) and recurved. Branching is dichotomous, occurring every 0.5–2.0 cm. The upper surface of the lobes is smooth, shiny, and ranges from flat to convex, while the lower surface lacks both a cortex and rhizines, being instead arachnoid (cobweb-like) and whitish with corticate margins.

A distinguishing characteristic of this species is the presence of prominent, black marginal cilia, which are simple or branched, dull, 0.1–0.2 mm thick, and can grow up to 8 mm long. These cilia are mostly covered with a pruina containing dark red pigment, excluding the very tips and bases. The species does not produce rhizines, soredia, isidia, or pseudocyphellae.

Apothecia (fruiting bodies) are common, measuring 4–7 mm in diameter and occurring laminally (on the surface of the lobes). Their margins feature 6–15 tapering lobes similar in form to the primary lobes. The apothecial discs are brownish-grey, typically heavily covered with white pruina. The hymenium (fertile tissue) is 100–180 μm tall, while the hypothecium (supporting tissue below the hymenium) is pale brown and about 30 μm thick. Ascospores are brown, contain one septum, have few sporoblastidia, and measure 35–43 by 19–22 μm.

Chemically, the cortex of H. rubrotricha reacts yellow with potassium hydroxide (K+), the medulla faintly yellow, and the red pigment on the cilia produces a purple reaction. Thin-layer chromatography has identified atranorin (in the cortex), zeorin (in the medulla), and a red anthraquinone pigment on the cilia.

== Habitat and distribution ==
Heterodermia rubrotricha has been found exclusively in Sri Lanka, specifically in the Central Province near Nuwara Eliya, growing on the smooth bark of tea plants (Camellia sinensis). It was first collected from a tea plantation at an elevation of about 1,700 m (5,600 ft). The genus Heterodermia is generally species-rich in tropical mountainous regions, and Sri Lanka is known for its diverse assemblage of foliose lichens, with Heterodermia potentially being the most species-rich foliose genus in the region. At the time of its original publication, H. rubrotricha was known only from its type locality.
