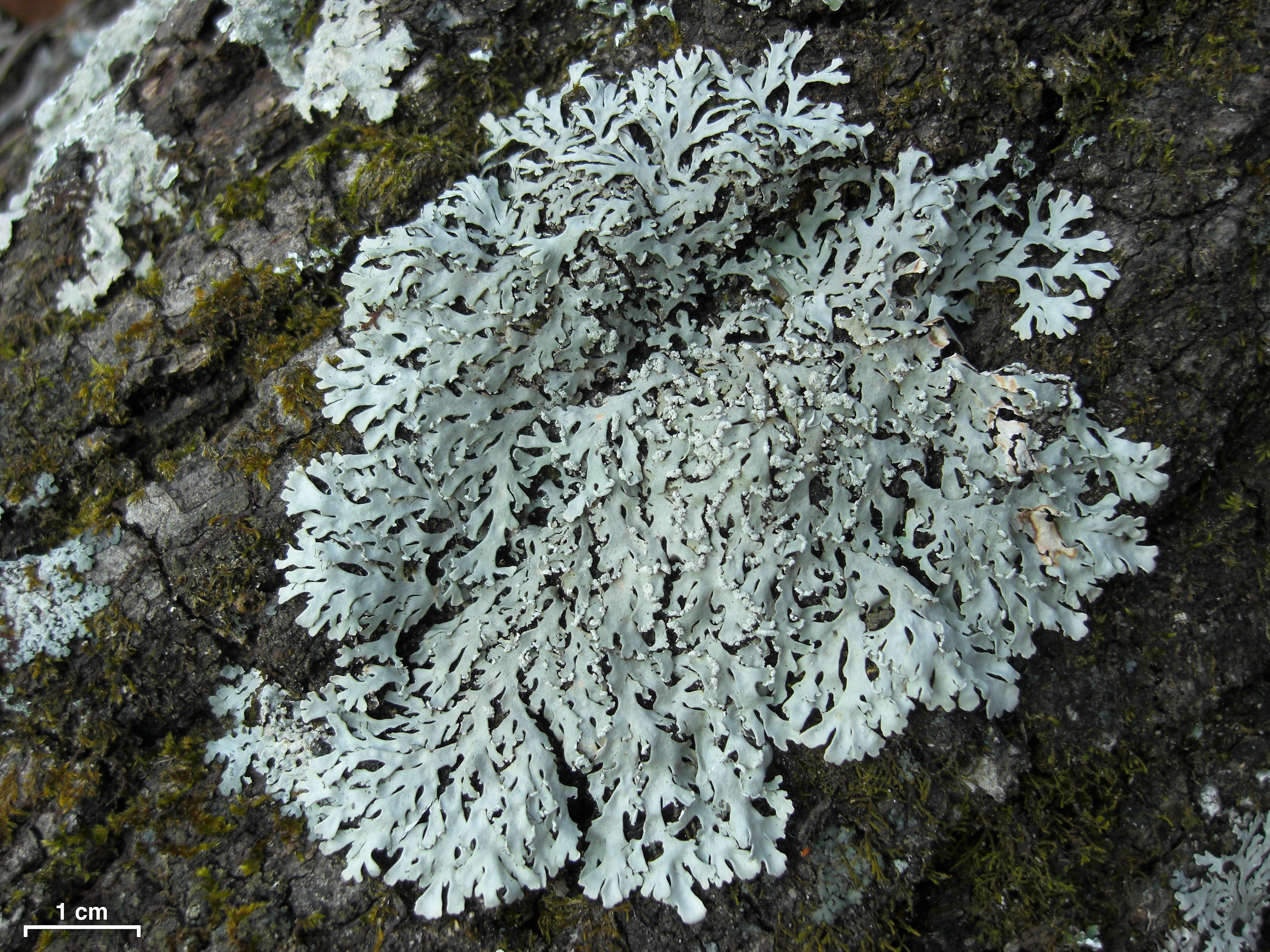

Scientific classification
- Domain: Eukaryota
- Kingdom: Fungi
- Division: Ascomycota
- Class: Lecanoromycetes
- Order: Caliciales
- Family: Physciaceae
- Genus: Polyblastidium
- Species: P. casarettianum

Binomial name
- Polyblastidium casarettianum (A.Massal.) Kalb (2015)

Synonyms
- Anaptychia casarettiana A.Massal. (1853); Heterodermia casarettiana (A.Massal.) Trevis. (1868); Hagenia casarettiana De Not. (1853)

= Polyblastidium casarettianum =

Species of lichen

Polyblastidium casarettianum is a species of corticolous (bark-dwelling), foliose lichen in the family Physciaceae.

== Taxonomy ==
The species was first scientifically described in 1853 by the Italian botanist Abramo Bartolommeo Massalongo, who classified it in the genus Anaptychia. Vittore Benedetto Antonio Trevisan de Saint-Léon reclassified it in genus Heterodermia in 1868. It was transferred to the newly circumscribed genus Polyblastidium in 2015 by Klaus Kalb.
