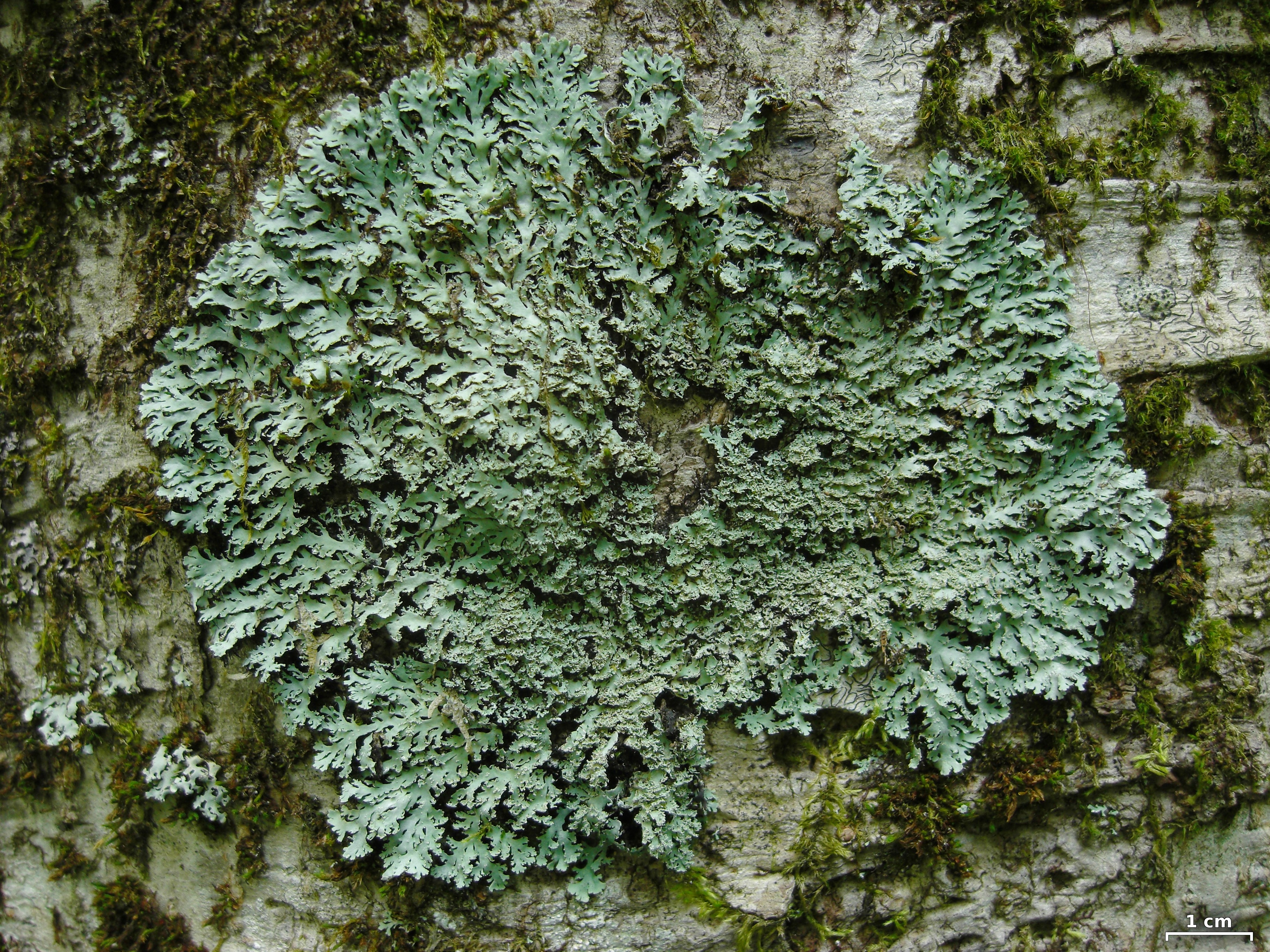

Conservation status
- Apparently Secure (NatureServe)

Scientific classification
- Kingdom: Fungi
- Division: Ascomycota
- Class: Lecanoromycetes
- Order: Caliciales
- Family: Physciaceae
- Genus: Polyblastidium
- Species: P. squamulosum

Binomial name
- Polyblastidium squamulosum (Degel.) Kalb (2015)

Synonyms
- Anaptychia squamulosa Degel. (1941); Heterodermia squamulosa (Degel.) W.L.Culb. (1967)

= Polyblastidium squamulosum =

Species of lichen

Polyblastidium squamulosum, commonly known as the scaly fringe lichen, is a species of corticolous (bark-dwelling), foliose lichen in the family Physciaceae. It is found in North America.

== Taxonomy ==
The species was first scientifically described by the Swedish lichenologist Gunnar Degelius in 1941, who initially classified it in the genus Anaptychia. William Culberson reclassified it in the genus Heterodermia in 1967. It was transferred to the newly circumscribed genus Polyblastidium in 2015 by Klaus Kalb.
