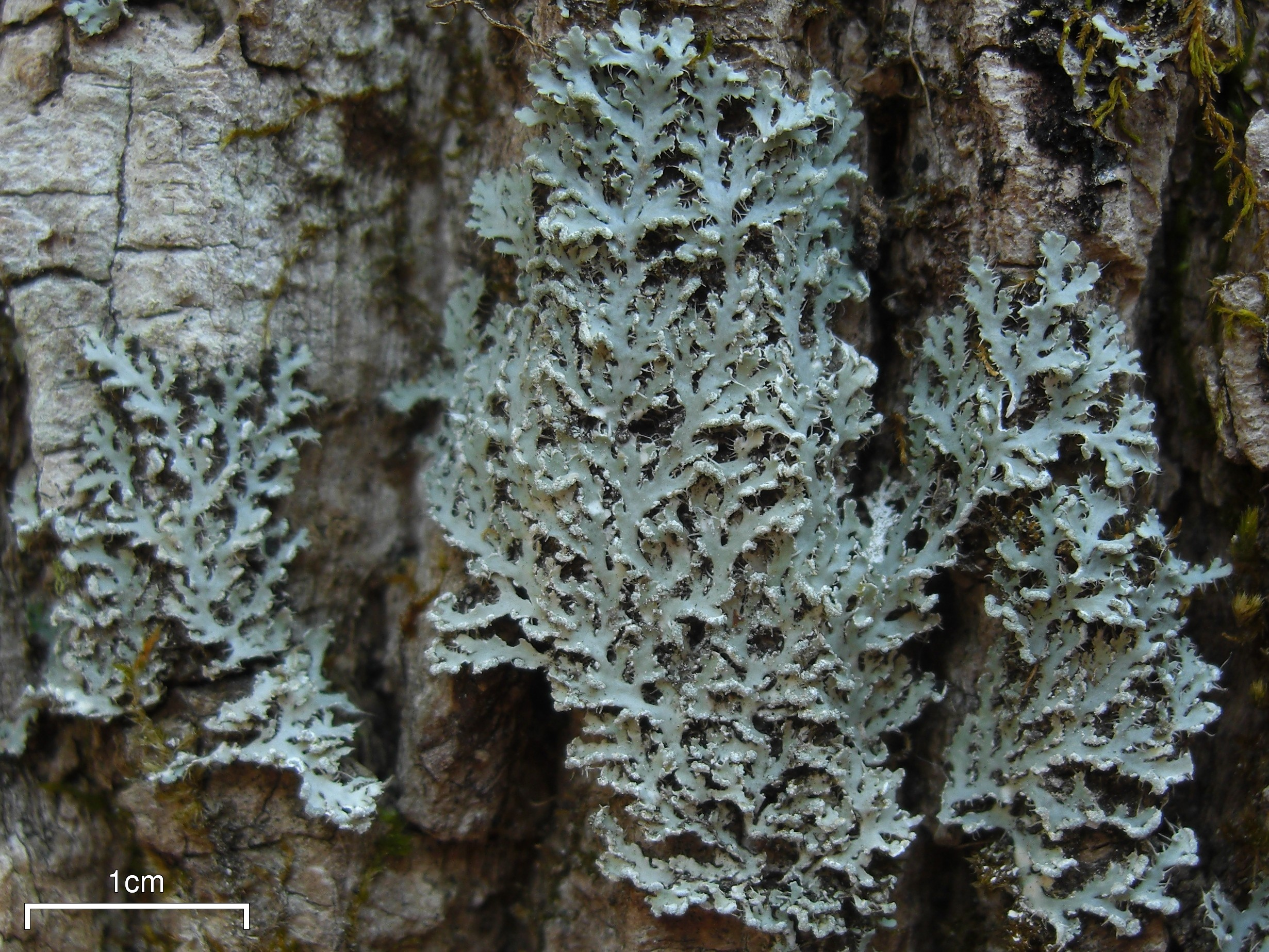
- Heterodermia speciosa

Scientific classification
- Kingdom: Fungi
- Division: Ascomycota
- Class: Lecanoromycetes
- Order: Caliciales
- Family: Physciaceae
- Genus: Heterodermia; Trevis. (1868)

Type species
- Heterodermia speciosa (Wulfen) Trevis. (1868)

Synonyms
- Pseudophyscia Müll.Arg. (1894); Chaudhuria Zahlbr. (1932)

= Heterodermia =

Genus of lichen

Heterodermia is a genus of foliose lichens in the family Physciaceae. The genus has a widespread distribution, especially in tropical regions, and contains about 70 species. Heterodermia was historically confused with the related genus Anaptychia, but was distinguished in 1965 based on differences in spore structure and chemical composition. These lichens can be identified in the field using simple chemical spot tests that produce distinctive colour changes when applied to the thallus. The lichens in this genus are small- to medium-sized, usually pale grey in colour, comprising narrow lobes with widened tips fringed with cilia. The lichens can be identified by their thick-walled ascospores and the presence of specific chemical compounds (lichen products) that produce colour reactions when spot tested. Most species are found in tropical and subtropical regions around the world, commonly growing on tree bark in mountain forests. Heterodermia species support a rich community of specialized parasitic fungi, with over 20 different species known to grow specifically on these lichens. Some species have traditional uses in medicine and cooking, particularly in India, Nepal, and Brazil.

== Taxonomy ==
According to Fernanda de Souza and colleagues, the first scientific study of the genus began in 1847 when Thomas Taylor described Parmelia diademata, a lichen that would eventually end up classified as a species of Heterodermia. The genus was formally circumscribed in 1868 by Italian botanist Vittore Benedetto Antonio Trevisan de Saint-Léon. The generic name, which combines the Greek heteros (other, different) and derma (a skin or hide), refers to the presence or absence of a lower cortex.

Prior to this classification, Heterodermia species were placed in genus Anaptychia, an idea proposed by Syo Kurokawa in his 1962 monograph on the genus, until some studies showed that the presence of thick-walled spores and the presence of atranorin could be used as characters to separate the genera. In 1965 Josef Poelt split Anaptychia into two genera. Lichens that remained in Anaptychia had thin-walled spores with sculptured surfaces, while those transferred to Heterodermia had thick-walled spores with smooth surfaces. Only nine species remained in the original Anaptychia classification. Although most contemporary lichenologists accepted Poelt's classification, Kurokawa initially rejected these changes in 1973. He later reversed his position and in 1998 accepted Heterodermia as distinct from Anaptychia, transferring several species accordingly.

In North America, members of Heterodermia are colloquially known as fringe lichens or centipede lichens.

== Description ==
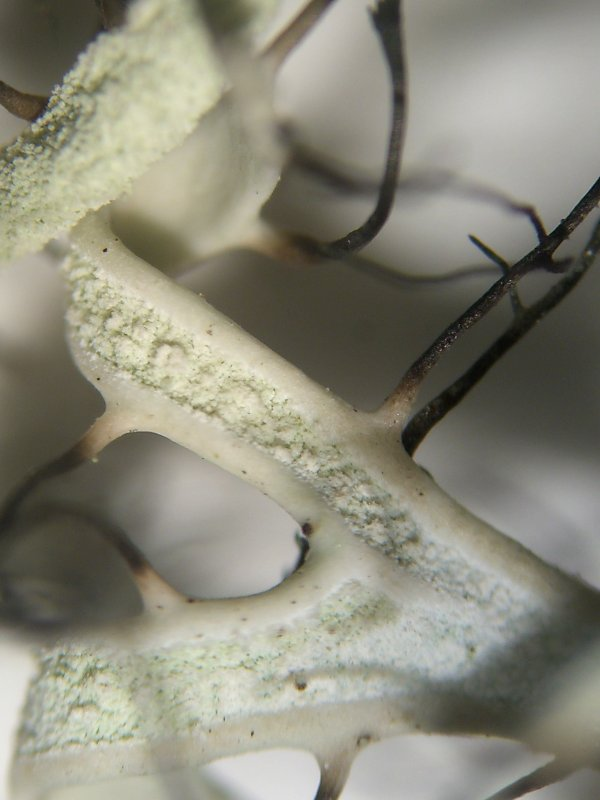
Lower surface of Heterodermia leucomela at 30x magnification, showing the lack of cortex characteristic of this genus.

Heterodermia typically forms a foliose thallus—occasionally shading towards a somewhat fruticose habit—that is continuous, lobate and irregular, or arranged in loose rosettes 2–10 cm (0.8–3.9 in) across. Neighbouring thalli can merge, producing broad radiating mats or tangled clumps. The lobes may lie separate or touch; they range from closely adnate and appressed to partly ascending and loosely attached, and are linear to linear-cuneate or spoon-shaped (spathulate). Branching is mostly dichotomous but can be irregular, and the margins are often fringed with cilia that are simple or densely branched.

The upper surface is whitish-, grey- or yellow-grey, flat to convex—sometimes concave near the edge—and may be dull or glossy. It can carry isidia, soredia, phyllidia or lobules, but never pseudocyphellae. The cortex consists of longitudinally aligned hyphae (a prosoplectenchyma, superficially like plant collenchyma). A hypothallus is absent. The photobiont forms a continuous band above a well-defined white medulla that may be tinged yellow, orange or brown. The lower surface, which may lack a cortex or bear a prosoplectenchymatous one, is white to whitish grey and often darkens to purple-grey, grey-black, or partly yellow, orange or brown. Rhizines are white to black, simple to densely branched—sometimes long enough to project beyond the lobe margins—and only rarely absent.

The ascomata (fruiting bodies) of Heterodermia are apothecial and lecanorine (ringed by thallus-like tissue). They sit on the thallus surface (laminal) and are rounded, either sessile or borne on a short stalk. The exposed hymenial surface, or disc, ranges from pale to dark brown or black; it can be concave or nearly flat and may appear frosted (pruinose) or smooth. A thalline exciple rims the disc—prominent or reflexed—and remains distinct throughout the apothecium's life.

In section, the epihymenium is pale brown to brown-black, while the underlying hymenium is colourless. The hypothecium is usually colourless, only rarely tinged pale yellow. Paraphyses branch toward the top, where their terminal cells broaden and turn brown. The asci are cylindrical to somewhat club-shaped—Lecanora-type—with eight ascospores. Their apex is amyloid and thick-walled, enclosing a clear axial body. The spores develop one or more sporoblastidia (small vacuoles in the wall). They turn grey-brown to dark brown, are ellipsoidal to oblong or fusiform, and have a single septum that often causes a slight constriction. Walls are very thick; internal apical thickenings only appear after the septum forms. A torus is thin or absent, and the surface remains smooth.

Conidiomata lie immersed in the thallus at first, later becoming emergent. Their conidiogenous cells form short, branched chains and produce conidia enteroblastically (inner-wall budding). The resulting conidia are bacilliform to short-cylindrical.

The genus Physcia most closely resembles Heterodermia. Unlike Heterodermia, however, it has a differently structured upper cortex consisting of pseudoparenchyma (which gives it a uniform, unoriented appearance), and its ascospores are different.

== Species ==
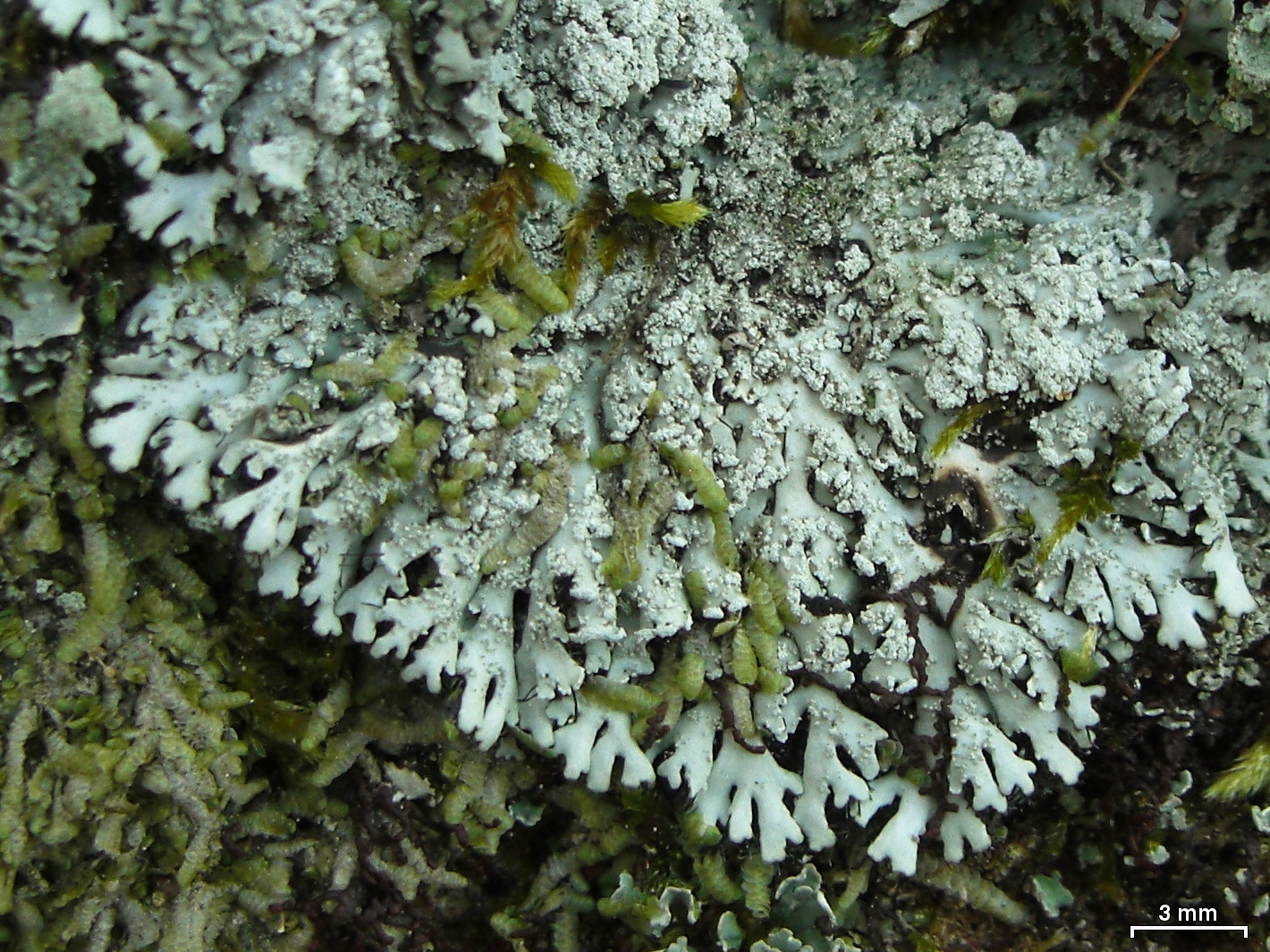
Heterodermia granulifera

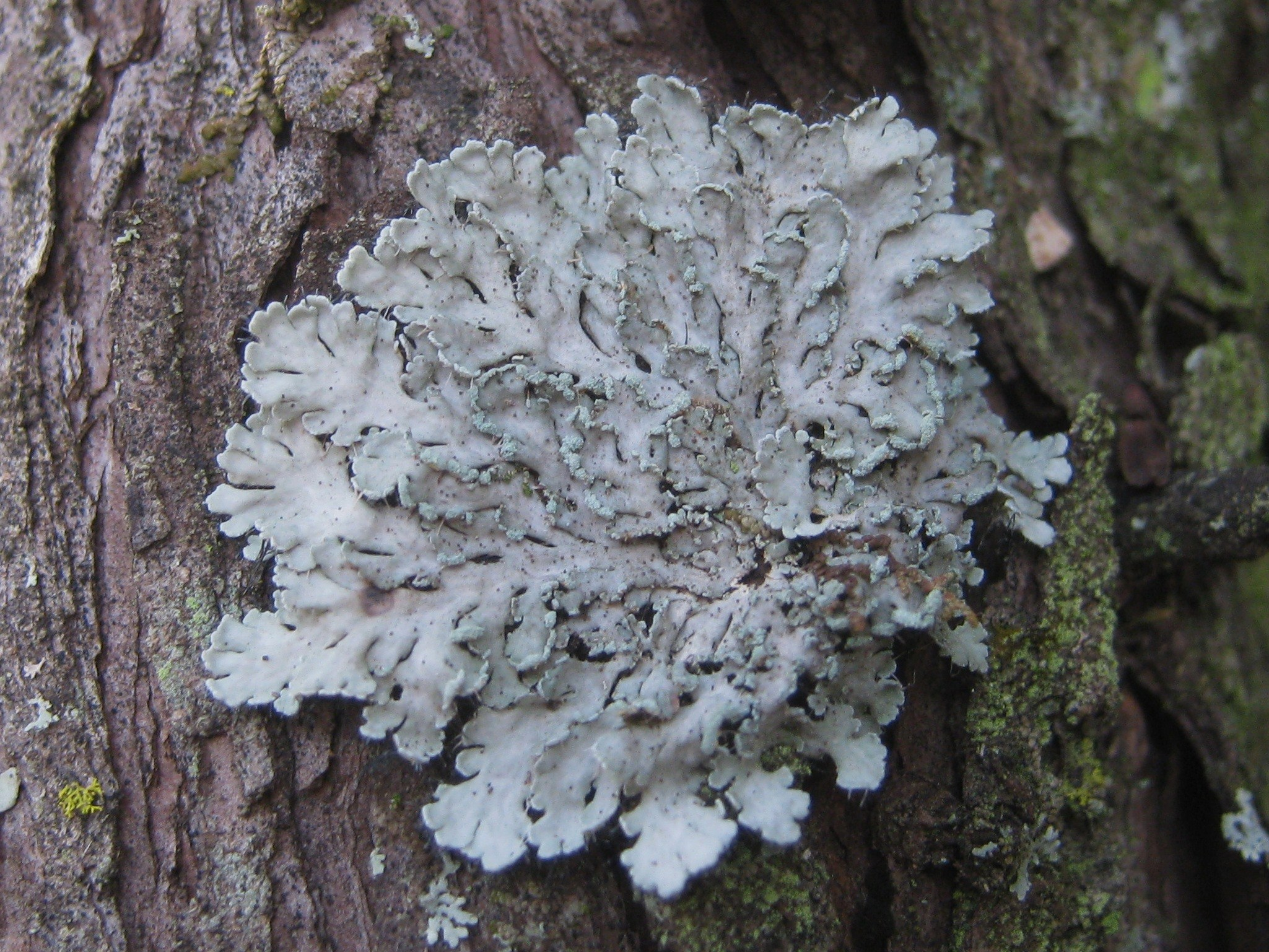
Heterodermia obscurata

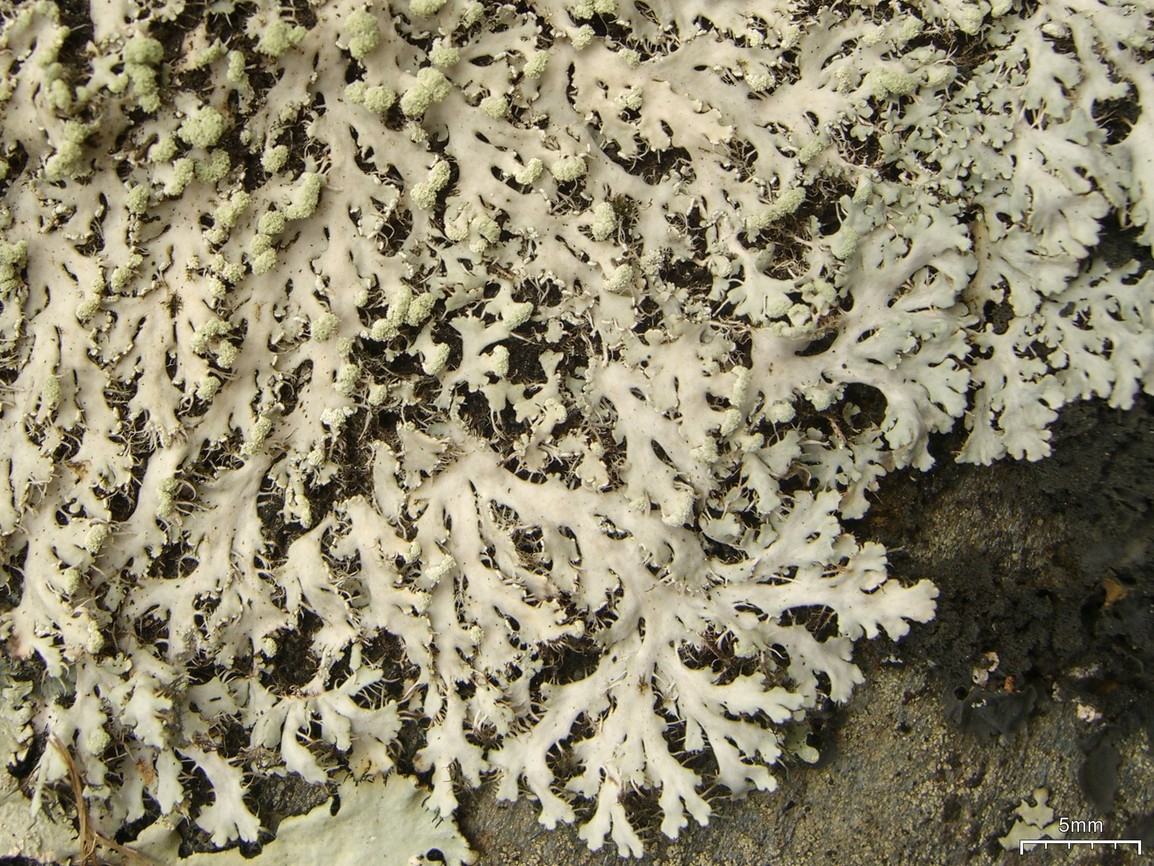
Heterodermia pseudospeciosa

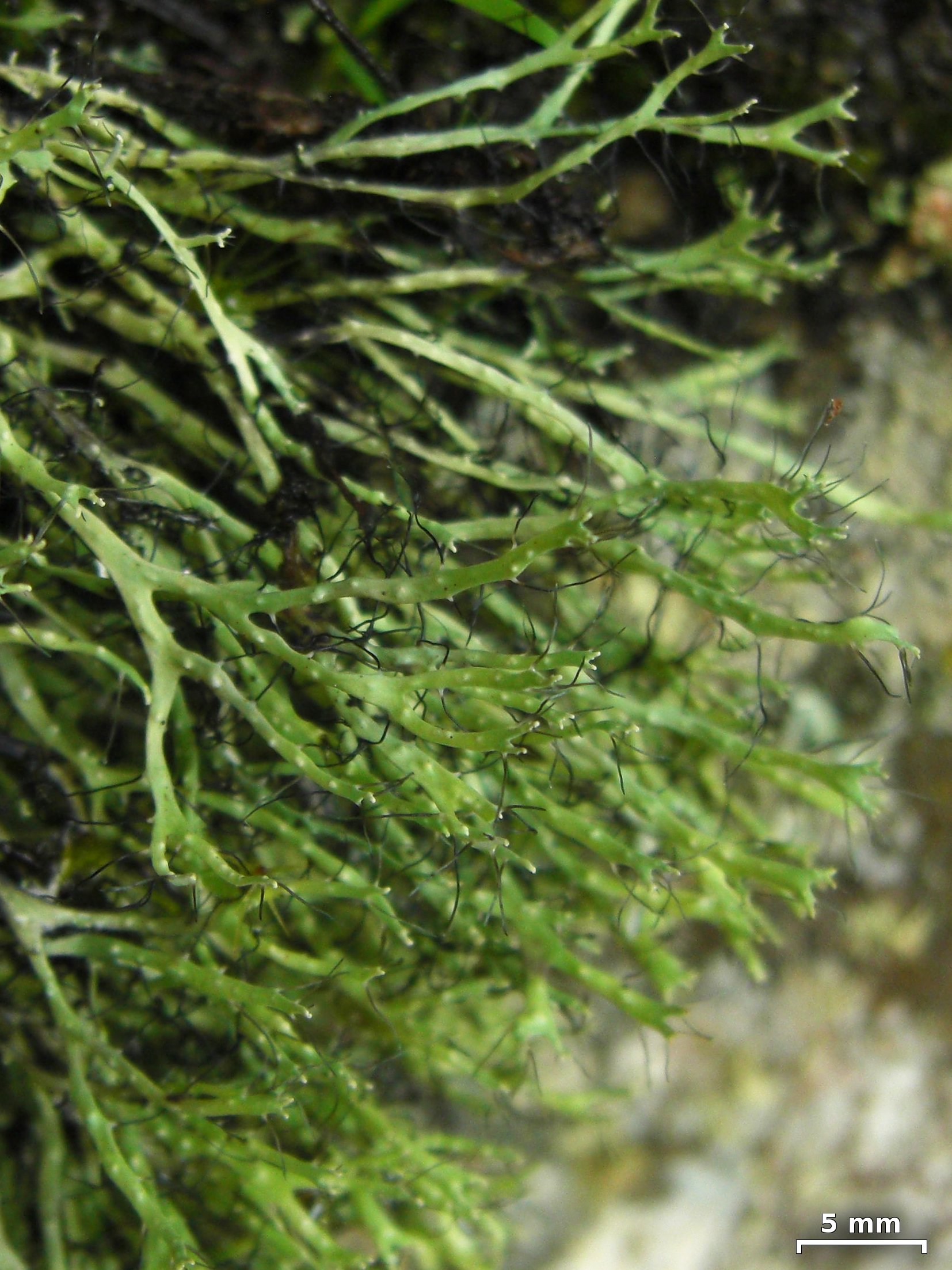
Heterodermia verrucifera

Recent estimates have placed the number of species in Heterodermia at about 115. As of July 2025, Species Fungorum accepts 66 species of Heterodermia, but does not yet account for several recent studies that have added many new species.

- Heterodermia adunca P.Jung & L.Werner (2023)
- Heterodermia africana (Kurok.) M.F.Souza & Aptroot (2022)
- Heterodermia amphilacinulata M.F.N.Martins & M.P.Marcelli (2022) – Brazil
- Heterodermia andina Moberg (2011)
- Heterodermia angustiloba (Müll.Arg.) D.D.Awasthi (1973) – Asia; Australia
- Heterodermia antillarum (Vain.) Swinscow & Krog (1976) – Australia; Central America; Caribbean; Africa; Galapagos Islands
- Heterodermia apicalis Aptroot & M.F.Souza (2022) – Brazil
- Heterodermia archeri Elix (2011)
- Heterodermia arvidssonii Moberg (2011)
- Heterodermia badia Moberg (2011)
- Heterodermia barbifera (Nyl.) Kr.P.Singh (1981)
- Heterodermia borphyllidiata (Kalb & Meesim) M.F.Souza & Aptroot (2022)
- Heterodermia caesiosora J.L.Watts, E.A.Tripp & Raynor (2025)
- Heterodermia caneziae M.F.Souza & Aptroot (2022) – Brazil
- Heterodermia comosa (Eschw.) Follmann & Redón (1972)
- Heterodermia coralloides Elix (2011) – Asia; Australia
- Heterodermia corcovadensis (Kurok.) Elix (2011)
- Heterodermia delicatula M.F.N.Martins & M.P.Marcelli (2022) – Brazil
- Heterodermia diademata (Taylor) D.D.Awasthi (1973) – Australia; North America; Central America; South America; Africa; Asia
- Heterodermia dissecta (Kurok.) D.D.Awasthi (1973) – Asia; Australia; Réunion
- Heterodermia dissecticodiademata M.F.Souza & Aptroot (2022) – Brazil
- Heterodermia dissecticoflabellata M.F.Souza & Aptroot (2022) – Brazil
- Heterodermia domingensis (Ach.) Trevis. (1869)
- Heterodermia erecta Lendemer (2009)
- Heterodermia erinacea (Ach.) W.A.Weber (1987)
- Heterodermia exuberans J.L.Watts, E.A.Tripp & Raynor (2025)
- Heterodermia flavodactyliza M.F.Souza & Aptroot (2022) – Brazil
- Heterodermia flavulifera M.F.Souza & Aptroot (2022) – Brazil
- Heterodermia follmannii Sipman (1995)
- Heterodermia fragmentata Weerakoon & Aptroot (2016)
- Heterodermia galactophylla (Tuck.) W.L.Culb. (1967)
- Heterodermia granulifera (Ach.) W.L.Culb. (1967)
- Heterodermia guzmaniana (Guzmán-Guillermo, Díaz-Escandón & Medel) J.L.Watts, E.A.Tripp & Raynor (2025)
- Heterodermia himalayana Y.Joshi, K.Chandra & M.Tripathi (2014)
- Heterodermia hybocarponica Elix (2010) – Australia
- Heterodermia isidiophora (Nyl.) D.D.Awasthi (1973)
- Heterodermia isidiophorella Elix (2011) – Australia
- Heterodermia kalbii M.F.N.Martins & Marcelli (2007) – Brazil
- Heterodermia koyana (Kurok.) Elix (2010)
- Heterodermia koyanoides Elix (2011) – Australia
- Heterodermia labiata M.F.N.Martins & M.P.Marcelli (2022) – Brazil
- Heterodermia langdoniana Lendemer & E.Tripp (2018)
- Heterodermia linearis Moberg & T.H.Nash (1999) – Mexico
- Heterodermia macrosoraliata M.F.N.Martins & M.P.Marcelli (2022) – Brazil
- Heterodermia minor M.F.Souza & Aptroot (2022) – Brazil
- Heterodermia mobergiana Michlig, M.P.Rodríguez & Aptroot (2017)
- Heterodermia namaquana Brusse (1992)
- Heterodermia neocomosa M.P.Rodríguez, L.I.Ferraro & Aptroot (2017)
- Heterodermia neocrocea M.F.Souza & Aptroot (2022) – Brazil
- Heterodermia neoleucomelaena (Kurok.) D.D.Awasthi (1973)
- Heterodermia nigromarginata M.F.Souza & Aptroot (2022) – Brazil
- Heterodermia obscurata (Nyl.) Trevis. (1869)
- Heterodermia orientalis J.B.Chen & D.P.Wang (2001) – China
- Heterodermia papuana Aptroot & Sipman (1991)
- Heterodermia parva Moberg (2011)
- Heterodermia phyllalbicans M.F.Souza & Aptroot (2022) – Brazil
- Heterodermia pindurae Eb.Fisch., Killmann, Ertz & Sérus. (2017) – Rwanda
- Heterodermia pinnata Sipman (1995)
- Heterodermia podocarpa (Bél.) D.D.Awasthi (1973)
- Heterodermia pseudospeciosa (Kurok.) W.L.Culb. (1967)
- Heterodermia queensberryi Weerakoon & Aptroot (2014)
- Heterodermia ramosociliata M.P.Rodríguez, Michlig & Aptroot (2017)
- Heterodermia rubrotricha Weerakoon & Aptroot (2013)
- Heterodermia sinocomosa J.B.Chen (2001) – China
- Heterodermia sorediosa Michlig, L.I.Ferraro & Aptroot (2017)
- Heterodermia spathulifera Moberg & Purvis (1997)
- Heterodermia speciosa (Wulfen) Trevis. (1868)
- Heterodermia spielmannii M.F.Souza & Aptroot (2022) – Brazil
- Heterodermia subcitrina Moberg (2004)
- Heterodermia subcomosa (Nyl.) Elix (1985)
- Heterodermia sublinearis M.F.N.Martins & M.P.Marcelli (2022) – Brazil
- Heterodermia tabularis Elix (2011) – Australia
- Heterodermia tasmanica Elix (2011) – Australia
- Heterodermia tremulans (Müll.Arg.) W.L.Culb. (1967)
- Heterodermia upretii Y.Joshi, S.Upadhyay & K.Chandra (2014)
- Heterodermia urtasuni Chaves, L.Umaña & Sipman (2006)
- Heterodermia velata Marcelli & Benatti (2018) – Brazil
- Heterodermia verdonii Elix (2011)
- Heterodermia verrucifera (Kurok.) W.A.Weber (1981)

Several former Heteroderma species have been moved to Polyblastidium. This includes P. appendiculatum, P. casarettianum, P. chilense, P. corallophorum, P. dendriticum, P. fragilissimum, P. hypocaesium, P. propaguliferum, P. japonicum, P. magellanicum, P. microphyllum, P. neglectum, P. queenslandicum, P. squamulosum, P. subneglectum, P. togashii, and P. violostriatum.

== Habitat and distribution ==
Regional monographs of Heterodermia have been published for several tropical regions, including Africa (26 species), Australia (42 species), South America (33 species), Brazil (68 species), Thailand (39 species), Most species have a pantropical or subtropical distribution, although a few have ranges that extend into temperate or oceanic regions. Tropical montane forest are a common habitat for many species, and many grow on tree bark or twigs. A few species however, also grow on rock or compacted soil, while fewer yet occur only on these substrates.

== Ecology ==
Heterodermia species serve as hosts for a diverse community of lichenicolous fungi—specialized fungi that grow parasitically or commensally on lichens. These fungi represent one of the most species-rich groups of organisms associated with Heterodermia, with more than 20 documented species: Lichenostigma heterodermiae, Phoma heterodermiae, Polycoccum heterodermiae, Lichenotubeufia heterodermiae, Lichenopeltella heterodermiae, Sphaerellothecium episoralium, Sphaerellothecium gallowayi, Sphaerellothecium heterodermiae, Capronia muellerelloides, Capronia solitaria, Endococcus sipmanii, Stigmidium heterodermiae, Sclerococcum heterodermiae, Nanostictis heterodermiae, Hyalopeziza heterodermiae, Pleoscutula arsenii, Epicladonia heterodermiae, Nectriopsis heterodermiae, Nectriopsis lichenophila, Pronectria pycnidioidea, and Neobarya ciliaris.

== Chemistry ==
Careful application of the K spot test can be used to detect most of the diagnostic lichen products in Heterodermia, although thin-layer chromatography is usually essential for a definite identification. Because they occur in all species of Heterodermia, atranorin and zeorin have no diagnostic value. Norstictic acid (K+ yellow → orange-red), with or without connorstictic acid (or rarely only connorstictic), salazinic acid (K+ yellow → blood red), or dissectic acid are occasionally present, and their presence is a useful character at species level. Pigments are also diagnostic, even though the certain identification of the emodin derivatives is not always possible. The pigments are clustered in chemosyndromes (a biogenetically related set of major and minor natural metabolic products produced by a species) and there are only three different main chemosyndromes that can be distinguished by colour and K reaction. Additional terpenoids have also been recorded, including (spathulene, japonene, leucotylin, and several hopane derivatives.

== Uses ==
There are some Heterodermia species that are used as components of traditional medicine, and as spices or flavouring agent. Heterodermia diademata is used by the Nepalese of Sikkim, who apply the thalli of this lichen to cuts to protect them from wetting and infection. This species is also used in Uttar Pradesh, India as a perfume ingredient. Several ethnic groups in Madhya Pradesh (a state in middle India) use the thallus of Heterodermia tremulans as a spice and flavouring agent in various dishes of vegetables and meat. The Pankararu people of Pernambuco State, Brazil, use H. galactophylla for treating digestive system-related problems such as diarrhea and vomiting and for treating epilepsy.
