= Apolychrosis =

Scientific classification
- Domain: Eukaryota
- Kingdom: Animalia
- Phylum: Arthropoda
- Class: Insecta
- Order: Lepidoptera
- Family: Tortricidae
- Tribe: Euliini
- Genus: Apolychrosis; Amsel, 1962

Species
- See text

Genus of tortrix moths

Apolychrosis is a genus of moths belonging to the family Tortricidae.

== Species ==
- Apolychrosis ambogonium Pogue, in Cibrian-Tovar et al., 1986
- Apolychrosis candidus Pogue, in Cibrian-Tovar et al., 1986
- Apolychrosis ferruginus Pogue, in Cibrian-Tovar et al., 1986
- Apolychrosis schwerdtfegeri Amsel, 1962
- Apolychrosis synchysis Pogue, in Cibrian-Tovar et al., 1986
