= Heterodermia apicalis =

Scientific classification
- Kingdom: Fungi
- Division: Ascomycota
- Class: Lecanoromycetes
- Order: Caliciales
- Family: Physciaceae
- Genus: Heterodermia
- Species: H. apicalis

Binomial name
- Heterodermia apicalis Aptroot & M.F.Souza (2022)

Species of lichen-forming fungus

Heterodermia apicalis is a corticolous (bark-dwelling) lichen in the family Physciaceae. It was described from specimens collected on granite outcrops in primary rainforest at Reserva Cristalino in Mato Grosso, Brazil. The lichen is separated from similar Heterodermia species by the patchy yellow pigment and black-edged patches on parts of its lower surface.

== Taxonomy ==
Heterodermia apicalis was described in 2022 by André Aptroot and Maria Fernanda de Souza Silva from material collected on granite outcrops in primary rain forest in the Reserva Cristalino (Mato Grosso, Brazil), at 250–350 m (820–1,150 ft) elevation. The holotype (A. Aptroot 84262), the single reference specimen for the name, is deposited in the herbarium of the Federal University of Mato Grosso do Sul (CGMS). Within Heterodermia, it is placed in the H. dactyliza species group and was compared with H. flavodactyliza. Both have a similar foliose thallus, but H. flavodactyliza has web-like (arachnoid) orange pigment over most of the lower surface, whereas H. apicalis has spotted to patchy yellow pigment and black margins only on parts of the lower surface. In the key to Brazilian Heterodermia species it falls in the couplet for taxa with spotted yellow pigment on the lower surface.

== Description ==
The thallus of Heterodermia apicalis is foliose (leaf-like), ochraceous gray and loosely attached to the rock. It forms rosettes up to about 9 cm (3.5 in) wide and is roughly 150 μm thick. The upper cortex is about 70 μm thick, and there is no distinct lower cortex. The lobes branch unequally (anisotomic branching), leaving large gaps between them. They are mostly flat, sometimes overlapping sideways, and measure 1.5–2.5 mm long by 0.6–1.2 mm wide. Soredia, phyllidia and isidia are absent. However, the tips of secondary lobes are often slightly upturned and white, suggesting incipient soralia (developing patches where soredia can form). The medulla is white. The lower surface lacks a cortex and bears scattered spots of yellow pigment. Toward the tips of some lobes, the pigment forms larger patches bordered by black margins about 0.2 mm wide. Cilia (hair-like outgrowths) are black and project from the lobe margins. They measure 0.5–1.7 mm long by 0.1–0.2 mm thick and are densely branched, with squarrose (spreading) to irregular side branches. Apothecia (sexual fruiting bodies) have not been observed, but pycnidia (asexual fruiting bodies) are present, though sparse and brown. In standard spot tests, the thallus shows no reaction in UV, C, K, KC, or P tests, but the yellow pigment is K+ (turning blood-red). Thin-layer chromatography detected atranorin and zeorin, along with a terpenoid (probably 6α,16β-diacetoxyhopane-22-ol) and the anthraquinones emodin and 5,7-dichloroemodin as lichen substances.

== Habitat and distribution ==
Heterodermia apicalis grows on granite in rock outcrops within primary rainforest in the Reserva Cristalino region of Mato Grosso, Brazil, at about 250 and 350 m (820 and 1,150 ft) elevation. At the time of its original publication (2022), it was known only from Brazil. As of 2025, no additional records had been published.
