= Heterodermia fragmentata =

Scientific classification
- Domain: Eukaryota
- Kingdom: Fungi
- Division: Ascomycota
- Class: Lecanoromycetes
- Order: Caliciales
- Family: Physciaceae
- Genus: Heterodermia
- Species: H. fragmentata

Binomial name
- Heterodermia fragmentata Weerakoon & Aptroot (2015)

Species of lichen

Heterodermia fragmentata is a species of corticolous (bark-dwelling) foliose lichen in the family Physciaceae. It occurs in Sri Lanka.

== Taxonomy ==
Heterodermia fragmentata was formally described and published by lichenologists Gothamie Weerakoon and André Aptroot 2015. The type specimen was collected by both authors in Nuwara Eliya, Sri Lanka, on the bark of a tree.

== Description ==
The species has a foliose (leafy) thallus, forming tufts up to 7 cm in diameter, with linear, grey lobes up to 1 cm long and 0.7–2.2 mm wide. The tips of these lobes are often slightly recurved and spotted with white pruina. The lobes have margins with a thin dark grey line, while the lower surface is arachnoid, white, and often blackens towards the centre. It features black, shiny, mostly simple (unbranched) cilia up to 3 mm long.

The lichen reproduces through apothecia, which are rare, stipitate, and laminal on the upper surface of the thallus lobes. These apothecia develop tapering lobes around their margins, with a brown disc covered in pale brown pruina. The thallus surface lacks soredia, isidia, and lobules. Instead, the non-peripheral part of the thallus becomes dissected into small lobes with similar cilia. It contains atranorin in the cortex and zeorin in the medulla.

== Habitat and distribution ==
Heterodermia fragmentata is found on trees and shrubs, predominantly in submontane forests and open mountainous areas. It is known only from Sri Lanka, where it is widespread and locally abundant.
