= Apolychrosis schwerdtfegeri =

Scientific classification
- Domain: Eukaryota
- Kingdom: Animalia
- Phylum: Arthropoda
- Class: Insecta
- Order: Lepidoptera
- Family: Tortricidae
- Genus: Apolychrosis
- Species: A. schwerdtfegeri

Binomial name
- Apolychrosis schwerdtfegeri Amsel, 1962

Species of moth

Apolychrosis schwerdtfegeri is a species of moth of the family Tortricidae. It is found in Guatemala.
