= Apolychrosis ambogonium =

Scientific classification
- Domain: Eukaryota
- Kingdom: Animalia
- Phylum: Arthropoda
- Class: Insecta
- Order: Lepidoptera
- Family: Tortricidae
- Genus: Apolychrosis
- Species: A. ambogonium

Binomial name
- Apolychrosis ambogonium Pogue, in Cibrian-Tovar et al., 1986

Species of moth

Apolychrosis ambogonium is a species of moth of the family Tortricidae. It is found in Mexico.
