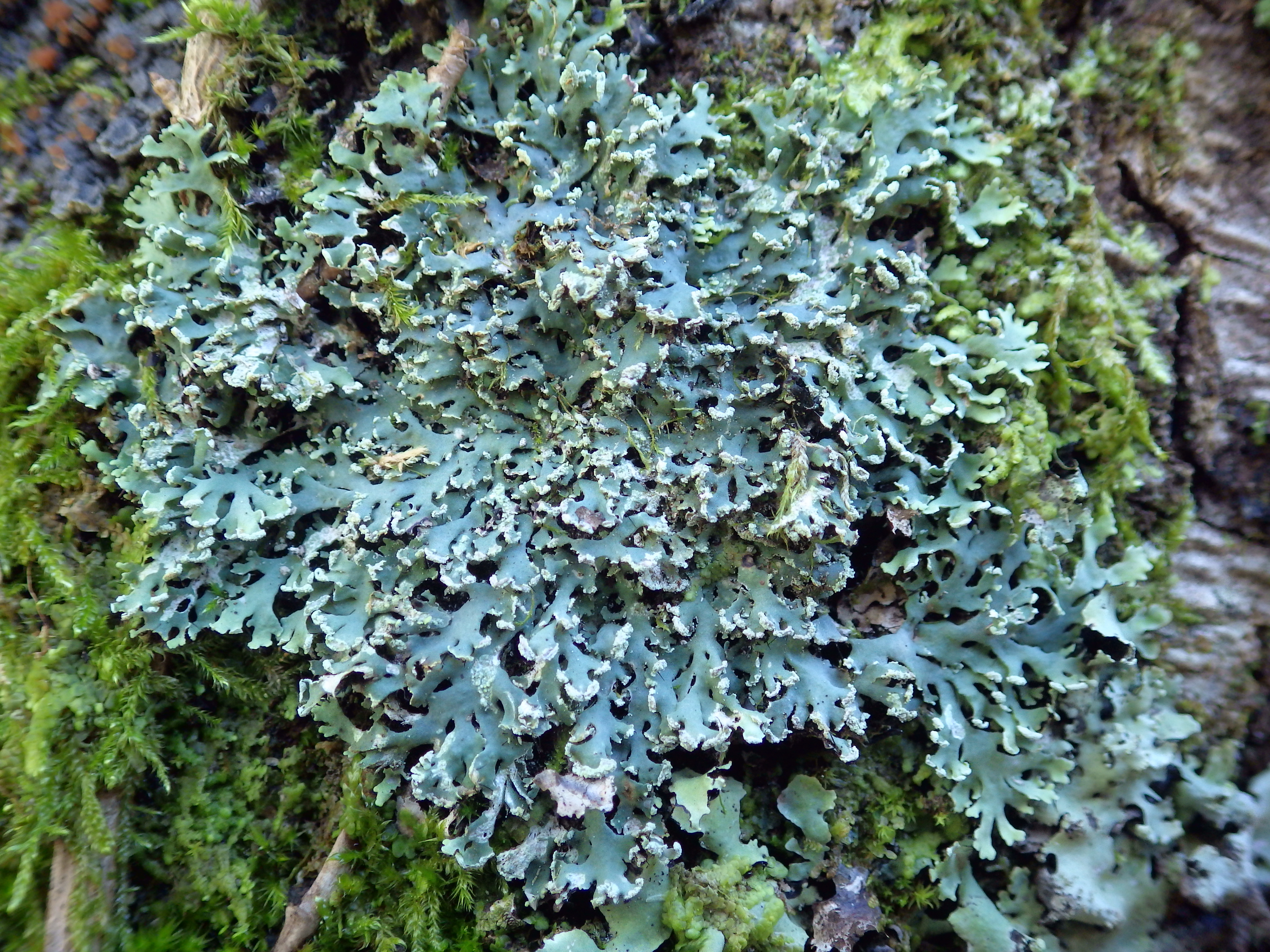

Scientific classification
- Kingdom: Fungi
- Division: Ascomycota
- Class: Lecanoromycetes
- Order: Caliciales
- Family: Physciaceae
- Genus: Polyblastidium
- Species: P. japonicum

Binomial name
- Polyblastidium japonicum (M.Satô) Kalb (2015)

Synonyms
- List: Anaptychia dendritica var. japonica M.Satô (1936); Anaptychia japonica (M.Satô) Kurok. (1962); Heterodermia japonica (M.Satô) Swinscow & Krog (1976); Physcia speciosa f. sorediifera Müll.Arg. (1884); Physcia hypoleuca var. sorediifera (Müll.Arg.) Stizenb. (1890); Pseudophyscia speciosa f. sorediifera (Müll.Arg.) Müll.Arg. (1893); Pseudophyscia hypoleuca f. sorediifera (Müll.Arg.) Hue (1899); Parmelia hypoleuca var. sorediifera (Müll.Arg.) Jatta (1902); Anaptychia sorediifera (Müll.Arg.) Du Rietz & Lynge (1924); Anaptychia speciosa f. sorediifera (Müll.Arg.) Zahlbr. (1931); Anaptychia hypoleuca var. sorediifera (Müll.Arg.) Vain. (1931)

= Polyblastidium japonicum =

Species of lichen-forming fungus

Polyblastidium japonicum is a species of corticolous (bark-dwelling), foliose lichen in the family Physciaceae. It is found in Japan and Nepal.

== Taxonomy ==
The species was first scientifically described in 1936 by the Japanese lichenologist Masami Satô, who considered it as a variety of what was then known as Anaptychia dendritica. Syo Kurokawa promoted it to full species status in 1962. It was transferred to the newly circumscribed genus Polyblastidium in 2015 by Klaus Kalb.

== Habitat and distribution ==
In Nepal, Polyblastidium japonicum has been reported from 3,000 to 4,000 m elevation in a compilation of published records.
