= Sunfleck =

Brief increase in solar irradiance

Sunflecks are brief increases in solar irradiance that occur in understories of an ecosystem when sunlight is able to reach the ground directly. They are created as moving leaves or branches periodically open gaps in the canopy, or as the sun's position shifts during the day. Although each sunfleck lasts only seconds or minutes, they can deliver more than 80% of the photons reaching understory leaves and account for up to 35% of daily carbon fixation. This makes them an essential energy source for shade plants. How much energy an individual sunfleck supplies depends on its duration, size, shape and the intensity of photosynthetically active radiation (PAR), which in turn is set by canopy structure and solar angle. The frequency and brightness of sunflecks vary widely within and among ecosystems, but generally decline as tree height and leaf area index rise.

The systematic study of sunflecks began in the 1920s, when botanists working in Panamanian rainforests first quantified their carbon value. Progress was slow until portable canopy-light recorders and standardised gap-analysis methods became available in the early 1970s; the field then expanded rapidly once fast CO_{2}/H_{2}O analysers in the 1980s made second-by-second gas exchange measurements practical. These advances revealed that transient light is processed differently from steady light: when a fleck arrives, photosynthesis accelerates only as quickly as rubisco can be activated and stomata can open, processes that together create an "induction lag". Conversely, the biochemical machinery shuts down more slowly once shade returns, meaning some carbon is fixed after the fleck ends, though the net gain remains small in deep shade.

Comparative work indicates that shade-tolerant trees often gain induction more quickly, and lose it more slowly, than early-successional species, yet large cross-taxon surveys find no simple link between shade tolerance and induction speed. Sunfleck use is therefore context dependent, shaped by leaf age, canopy position and even the time of day. Abiotic stresses further modulate the outcome: high leaf temperatures, water deficits and sudden PAR spikes can all diminish the realised benefit, while drought restricts stomatal conductance more in shade leaves than sun leaves, stretching the lag. Despite these complexities, models that ignore induction typically over-estimate daily understory photosynthesis by up to about 40%, demonstrating the need for dynamic light response routines. Research is extending these insights to entire canopies and to global change scenarios, where shifts in tree height, crown density and storm frequency could alter fleck patterns; resolving such issues remains a major frontier for canopy-carbon modelling.
