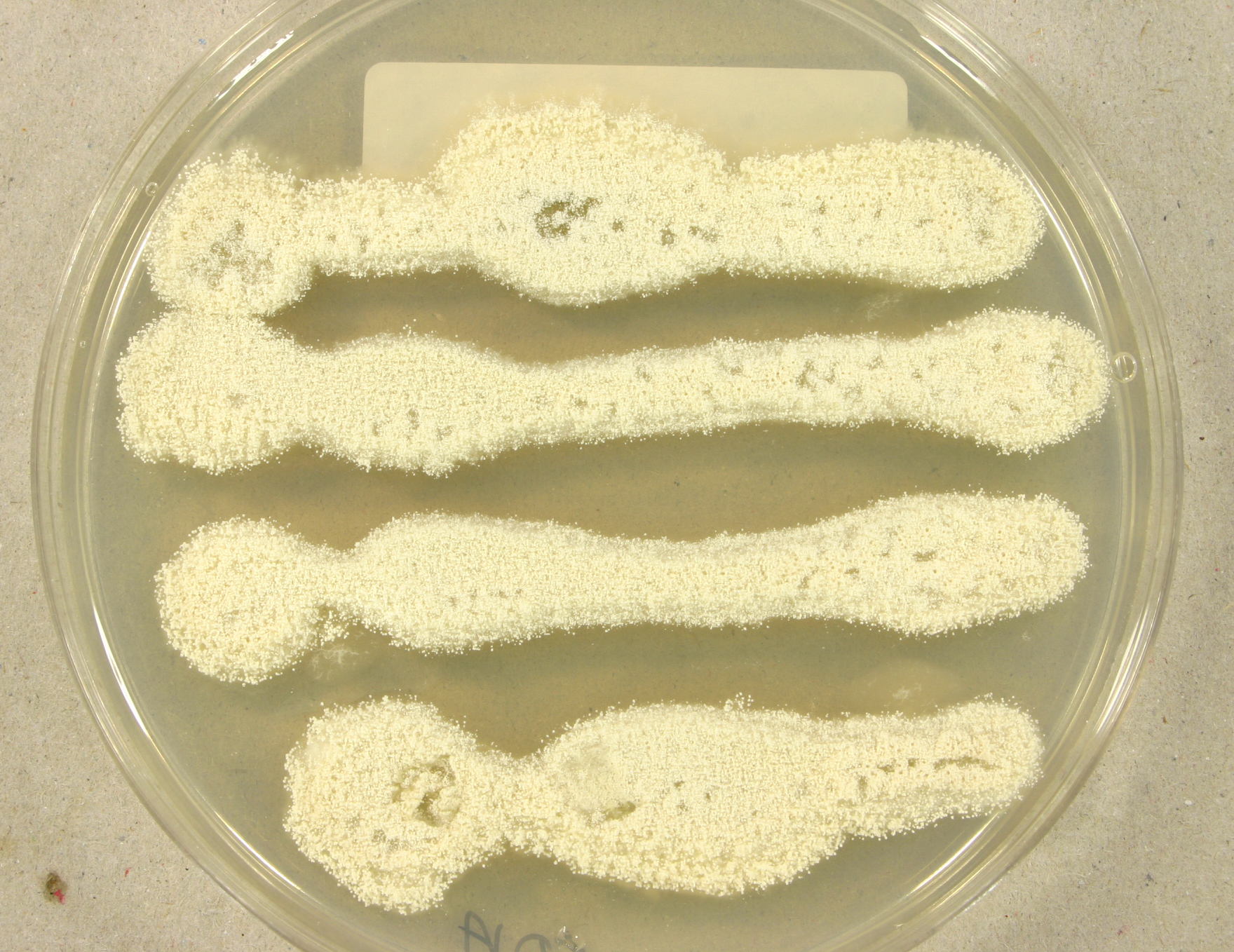

Scientific classification
- Kingdom: Fungi
- Division: Ascomycota
- Class: Eurotiomycetes
- Order: Eurotiales
- Family: Aspergillaceae
- Genus: Aspergillus
- Species: A. candidus

Binomial name
- Aspergillus candidus Link(1809)

Synonyms
- Aspergillus albus K. Wilh; Aspergillus okazakii Saito, Zentralbl. Bakteriol. Parsitenk.(1907); Aspergillus albus var. thermophiles Nakaz, Y.Takeda & Suematsu(1932); Aspergillus tritici B.S. Mehrotra & M. Basu(1976); Aspergillus triticus B.S. Mehrotra & M. Basu(1976)

= Aspergillus candidus =

Species of fungus

Aspergillus candidus (also called A. triticus, A. albus, and A. okazakii) is a white-spored species of fungus in the genus Aspergillus. Despite its lack of pigmentation, it is closely related to the most darkly pigmented aspergilli in the Aspergillus niger group. It is a common soil fungus worldwide and is known as a contaminant of a wide array of materials from the indoor environment to foods and products. It is an uncommon agent of onychomycosis and aspergillosis. The species epithet candidus (L.) refers to the white pigmentation of colonies of this fungus. It is from the Candidi section. The fungi in the Candidi section are known for their white spores. It has been isolated from wheat flour, djambee, and wheat grain.

== History and taxonomy ==
Aspergillus candidus is a member of the genus Aspergillus in the family Trichocomaceae, phylum Ascomycota. A number of subspecies and varieties have been recognised including: A. candidus subsp. tjibodensis, A. candidus var. amylolyticus, A. candidus var. candidus, A. candidus var. densior, and A. candidus var. tenuissima. Synonyms of A. candidus include A. albus, A. okazakii, A. tritici, and A. triticus, and the fungus is closely related to A. niger and A. ochraceus.

Early reports of white-spored aspergilli in the eighteenth and nineteenth century variously named these based on their gross appearance and white pigmentation, coining Latin species epithets such as 'candidus', 'albus', and 'niveus'. The species epithet 'candidus' was first used by Link in 1809, and later in 1824, he added two varieties, A. candidus var. tenuissima and A. candidus var. densior.

In 1877, Wilhelm described a species with biseriate sterigmata, globose vesicles, and short conidiophores as A. albus, which shared similarities between the A. albus described by Haller in 1742 and A. candidus described by Link in 1809. One reason for the confusion of identifying different species of fungus was that, two different fungus looked very similar to each other, but one was uniseriate (meaning there is one row of cells on the spore-bearing surface) and the other was biseriate (meaning there are two rows of cells on the spore-bearing surface). Wehmer appeared to have been the first one to suggest that a single culture of Aspergillus can contain both uniseriate and biseriate sterigmata in 1901. Wehmer then suggested that the species A. albus, St. candida, and A. candidus were synonymous, but there wasn't enough information to prove any clear identities of these species. In 1926, Charles Thom, who was a scientist at the U.S. Department of Agriculture in Peoria, Illinois, and Church suggested to group A. candidus, A. Okazakii, St. szurakiana, and St. ochroleuca together as being synonymous because of their white-spore appearance. However, in 1945, Thom and Kenneth Raper (also a scientist at the U.S. Department of Agriculture in Peoria, Illinois) rejected this idea because there were many more white-spored strains found in other genus, and that the white-coloured property alone was not enough reason to group these species together in one category. Today, there are five species that are accepted to be synonymous to A. candidus. (listed in the 'Taxonomy' section)

== Growth and morphology ==
Aspergillus candidus is exclusively an asexually reproducing species. It is closely related to the darkly pigmented group of aspergilli that includes A. niger, and is in the clade of aspergilli that includes the sexually-reproducing genus, Sterigmatocystis. A. candidus forms typical branching, septate hyphae, which produce conidial heads at maturity. Conidiogenesis is favoured in reduced oxygen atmospheres. Optimal growth of A. candidus occurs at 25–28 °C at 0.016 atm partial pressure of oxygen. Growth of this species has been reported at temperatures as low as 11–13 °C and as high as 41–42 °C. A. candidus is xerophilic, meaning it can grow in low water availability. When grown on stored grains in 15% moisture content, it has the ability to increase the moisture level (up to 18%) and elevate the temperature to as high as 55 °C In the laboratory, ' was observed on media containing substances like p-hydroxy-benzoic aldehyde, lignin sulphonate, and tannin (which contains substances that A. candidus uses and degrades). Aspergillus candidus exhibits a broad range of microscopic and colony morphology. Typically, the colonies of A. candidus are white and conidial heads are globose (spherical) or subglobose (subspherical) producing globose, smooth, thin-walled, conidia. En masse, the conidia are typically white to cream-coloured, but some strains may show a pinkish to reddish purple colour when they absorb the pigment from the sclerotia. By contrast, the closely related species A. niger has darkly pigmented conidia with a rough surface. Some strains of A. candidus make sclerotia in culture, which are nodules consisting of densely aggregated hyphae. Sclerotial production is often induced by incubation under stressful conditions such as relatively low temperature or interference competition from co-culture with other microorganisms. Conidial heads are typically 2.5–4.0 μm in diameter, with phialides either directly attached to the apical swelling of the conidiophore (uniseriate) or situated upon a palisade of basal cells (biseriate) – the latter being the most common presentation. Macroscopically, young A. candidus colonies may have a cottony texture in the outer surface which eventually becomes granular as the fungus matures and produces conidia.

A. candidus has been cultivated on both Czapek yeast extract agar (CYA) plates and Malt Extract Agar Oxoid (MEAOX) plates. The growth morphology of the colonies can be seen in the pictures below.

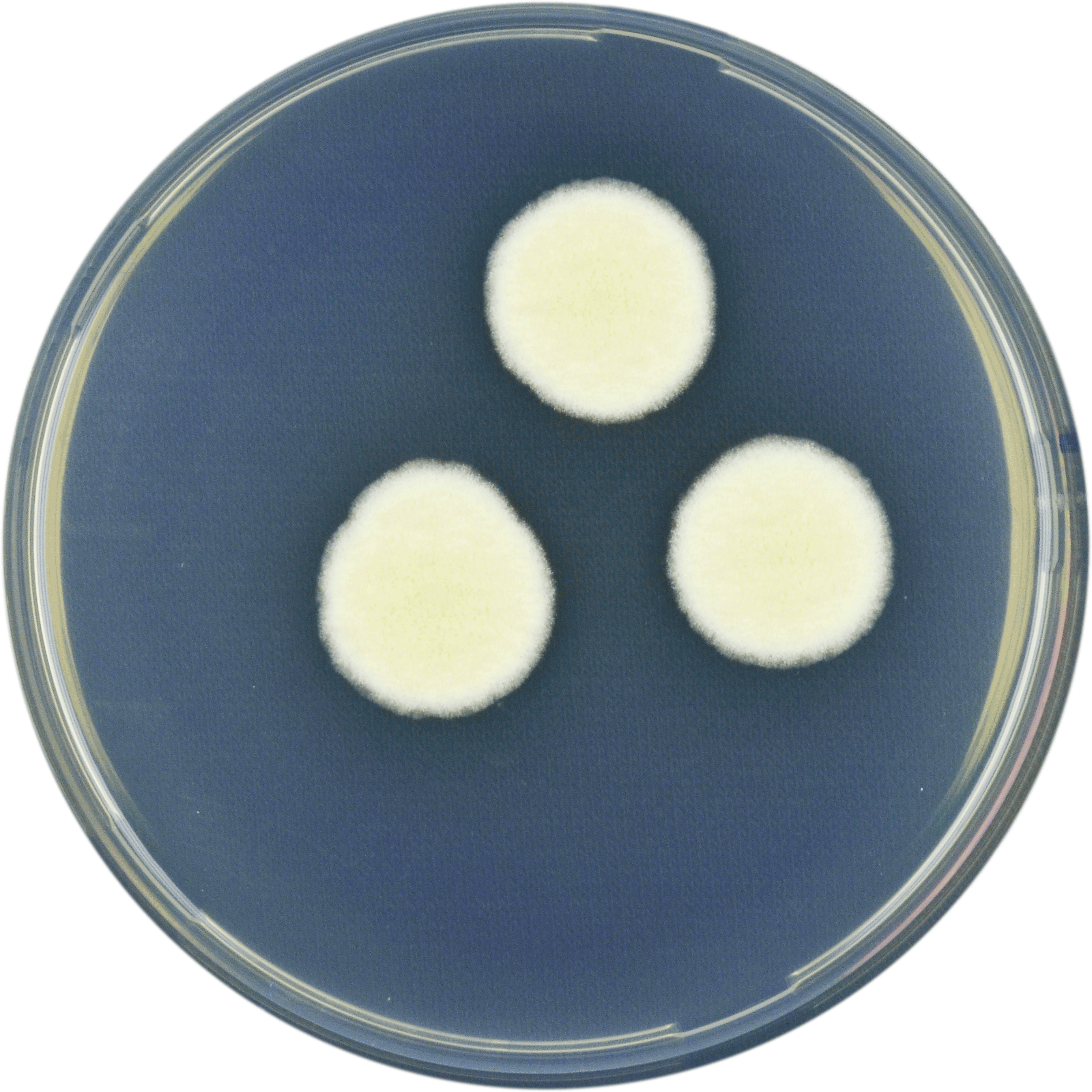
Aspergillus candidus growing on CYA plate

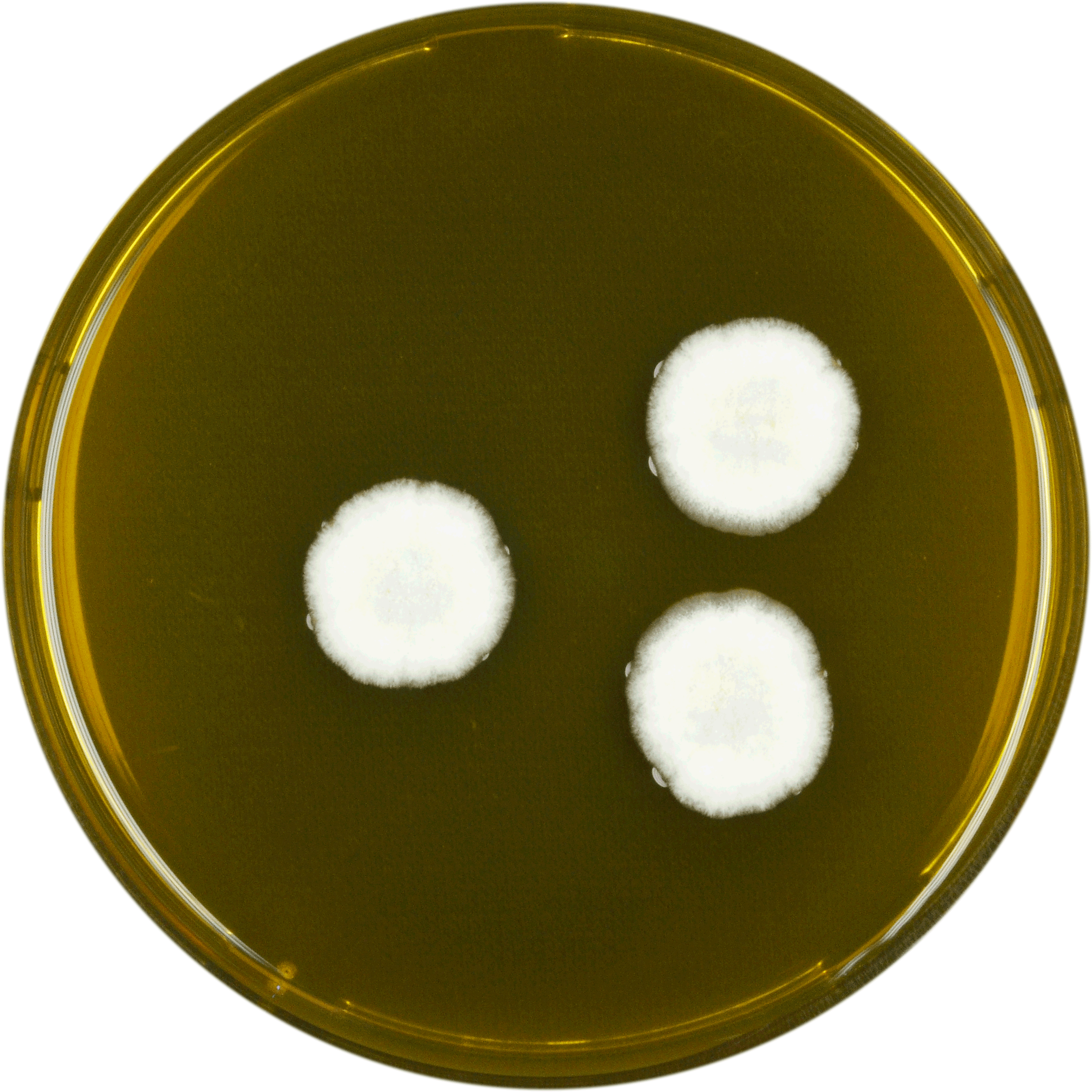
Aspergillus candidus growing on MEAOX plate

== Ecology and physiology ==
A. candidus is a common type of fungus found worldwide, particularly in tropical and subtropical regions. There have been reports of this fungus in Bangladesh, Pakistan, Kuwait, Sri Lanka, South and West Africa, Somalia, Sahara, Libya, Egypt, Syria, Israel, Argentina, Bahamas, New Guinea, the Solomon Islands, China, Central America, Chile, Nepal, and the US, indicating a very wide distribution in the world. A. candidus has been reported as a contaminant of many agricultural food products (such as wheat, oats, barley, corn, and rice), decay matter, soil, fur, compost, dead bees, dung, animal nests, and wood submerged in seawater. The species is also known from indoor environments and has been isolated from air, flooring, carpets, mattresses, and dust.

Contamination of maize by A. candidus has been shown to increase fat acidity content from the breakdown maize oil, leading to discoloration of the germ and loss of viability, A. candidus can oxidize tryptamine to traptophol, and use glucose and other sugars in the substrate and converts it into D-mannitol. A. candidus may sometimes cause self-heating which increases the temperature of the contaminated crop, in order to increase its competitiveness with other fungi living in the organism or environment at low relative humidity. There have been cases reported where contamination by A. candidus resulted in an increase in surrounding temperature by 20–26 °C. A. candidus has also been reported to use and degrade straw lignin, arabinoxylan, and cellulose.

== Pathogenicity ==
Aspergillus candidus has been associated with a variety of diseases such as hypersensitivity diseases, and infectious diseases including aspergillosis, otomycosis, and onychomycosis. The dry conidia produced by A. candidus are easily dispersed in air, leading to inhalation by humans and animals. Once in the lung and lower airway, the fungus induces can induce an allergic response (IgE hypersensitivity response). Organic dust toxic syndrome (ODTS) results from frequent inhalation of large amounts of organic dust containing a mixture of microorganisms often including A. candidus.

Immunosuppressed individuals (such as organ transplant recipients and HIV patients) are may be susceptible to infection by A. candidus. Invasive aspergillosis may be caused by A. candidus in humans, particularly in immunocompromised individuals, with high associated mortality. Diagnosis of invasive aspergillosis is difficult due to the non-specific clinical measures and symptoms. Some symptoms include fever, cough, and dyspnea (difficulty breathing). Radiologic examination may reveal an alveolar hemorrhage with the appearance of a nodule. Serum tests may show positive results for galactomannan and beta-D-glucan which are both the cell wall materials for A. candidus. Although these may provide strong evidence for invasive aspergillosis, false positive results are also common because many other fungal pathogens also show similar symptoms test results. If the invasive aspergillosis is kept untreated, the disease can spread from the lungs to any of the organs in the body. Dissemination to the central nervous system is especially fatal, resulting in seizure or stroke. Intravenous oral therapy by voriconazole has been used successfully in the treatment of invasive aspergillosis. Although voriconazole is most recommended, amphotericin B deoxycholate is a suitable alternative option for patients intolerant of voriconazole.

Hospital acquired infections by this species have been reported. The reason for this is due to the ability of A. candidus to reside in a wide range of environments, from showerheads to storage tanks and potted plants. The fungus can be observed microscopically in infected tissued mounted in potassium or sodium hydroxide solution containing the fluorescent brightener, calcofluor white, or in fungal-specific tissue stains such as Gomori methenamine silver (GMS) stain. Aspergillus candidus secretes cytotoxic metabolites like terphenyl compounds and terprenins, as well as citrinin and immunotoxic (1→3)-β-D-glucans. In addition to humans, there have also been reports of A. candidus disease in pigs and birds.

== Genome sequencing ==
The genome of A. candidus was sequenced in 2014 as a part of the Aspergillus whole-genome sequencing project – a project dedicated to performing whole-genome sequencing of all members of the genus Aspergillus. The genome assembly size was 27.32 Mbp.
