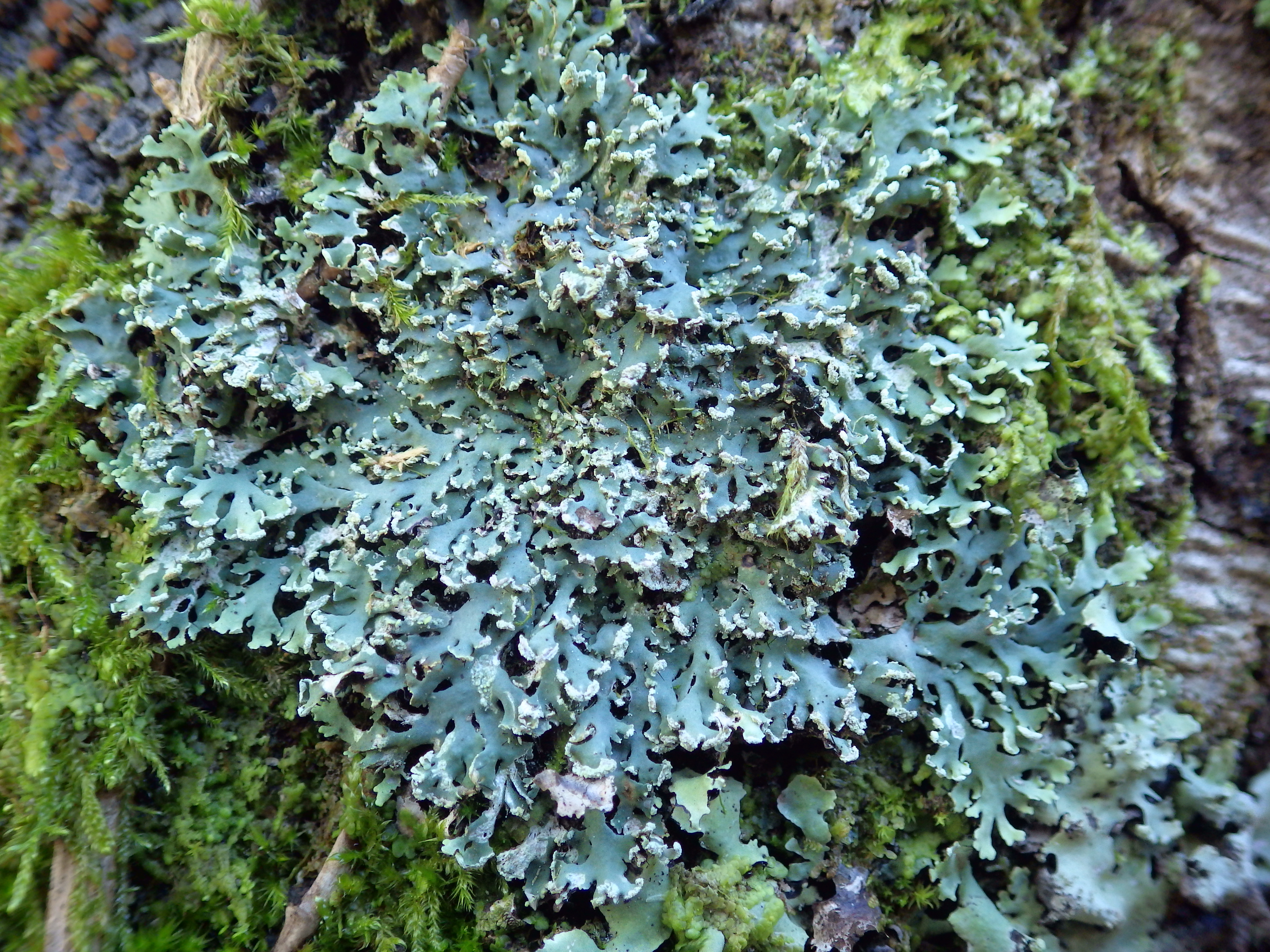
- Polyblastidium japonicum

Scientific classification
- Domain: Eukaryota
- Kingdom: Fungi
- Division: Ascomycota
- Class: Lecanoromycetes
- Order: Caliciales
- Family: Physciaceae
- Genus: Polyblastidium; Kalb (2015)

Type species
- Polyblastidium japonicum (M.Satô) Kalb (2015)

= Polyblastidium =

Genus of fungi

Polyblastidium is a genus of foliose lichens in the family Physciaceae. It has 18 species. The genus was circumscribed by German lichenologist Klaus Kalb in 2015, with Polyblastidium japonicum assigned as the type species. Polyblastidium is similar in morphology to Heterodermia, but its lower surface is cobweb-like in structure (arachnoid), and its ascospores are mostly 1-septate with 1 to 3 sporoblastidia (small subsidiary cavities). It is this latter feature that is referenced in the genus name Polyblastidium (poly = "many" + sporoblastidia). The genus contains several species that were formerly classified in the genus Anaptychia (section Polyblastidium series Polyblastidium).

== Species ==
- Polyblastidium appendiculatum (Kurok.) Kalb (2015)
- Polyblastidium casarettianum (A.Massal.) Kalb (2015)
- Polyblastidium chilense (Kurok.) Kalb (2015)
- Polyblastidium corallophorum (Taylor) Kalb (2015)
- Polyblastidium dendriticum (Pers.) Kalb (2015)
- Polyblastidium fragilissimum (Kurok.) Kalb (2015)
- Polyblastidium hypocaesium (Yasuda ex Räsänen) (Kalb 2015)
- Polyblastidium hypoleucum (Ach.) Kalb (2015)
- Polyblastidium japonicum (M.Satô) Kalb (2015)
- Polyblastidium magellanicum (Zahlbr.) Kalb (2015)
- Polyblastidium microphyllum (Kurok.) Kalb (2015)
- Polyblastidium neglectum (Lendemer, R.C.Harris & E.A.Tripp) Kalb (2015)
- Polyblastidium propaguliferum (Vain.) Kalb (2015)
- Polyblastidium queenslandicum (Elix) Kalb (2015)
- Polyblastidium squamulosum (Degel.) Kalb (2015)
- Polyblastidium subneglectum (Elix) Kalb (2015)
- Polyblastidium togashii (Kurok.) Kalb (2015)
- Polyblastidium violostriatum (Elix) Kalb (2015)
